= List of equipment of the Republic of China Army =

Below is a list of equipment used by the Republic of China Army (commonly known as the Taiwanese Army).

== Individual gear ==
Name/Origin	Type	Photo	Notes
Helmet
EMBH105 (Taiwan)	Combat helmet		Current standard issue combat helmet, this helmets' model influenced by western countries.
PASGT (United States/Taiwan	Combat helmet		Taiwanese made helmets in the style of the PASGT system, still in use.
CVCH (United States)	Crewman Helmet		Standard issue Crewman Helmet for Main battle tank and Armored Fighting Vehicle Crewman.
M1 helmet (United States)			Still used by Army, Navy, Air Force for training and Reserve units. This helmet also used by the Army Military Police and Honor Guards.
Ballistic Vest and Protective Gear
MBAV/IOTV Styled Vest (United States/Taiwan)			Previously the standard issue for the Army, being replaced by CV105 II Plate Carrier.
CV105 II Plate Carrier (Taiwan)			Current standard issue armour vest. This newly carrier is now seen with the ROC Armed Forces.
Flak Vest (Taiwan			Still in used. Issued to units in the ROC Army, Reservists, and Artillery.
Camouflage Uniform
Digital Camouflage Combat Uniform (DCCU)	Combat Uniform		Standard issued Battle Dress Uniform since 2013.
Patched Weather Parka	Combat Uniform		Issued to ROC Army units for cold weather.
ERDL pattern	Military camouflage Combat uniform		Former standard issued camouflage pattern.
MultiCam	Military camouflage Combat uniform		Issued to Army's Airborne and Special Operations Command.

== Small arms ==
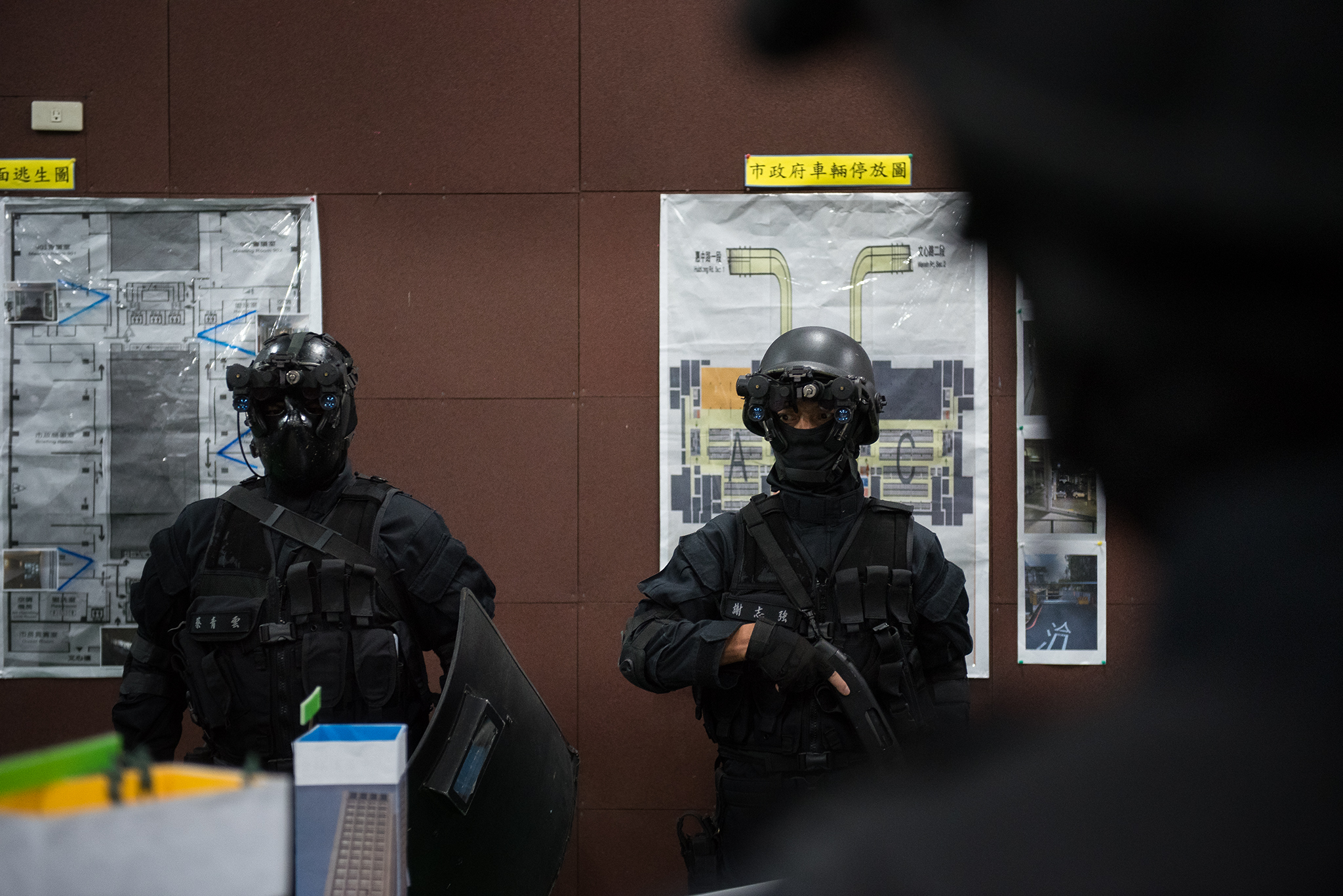
ROCA Special Force Team ASSC 2

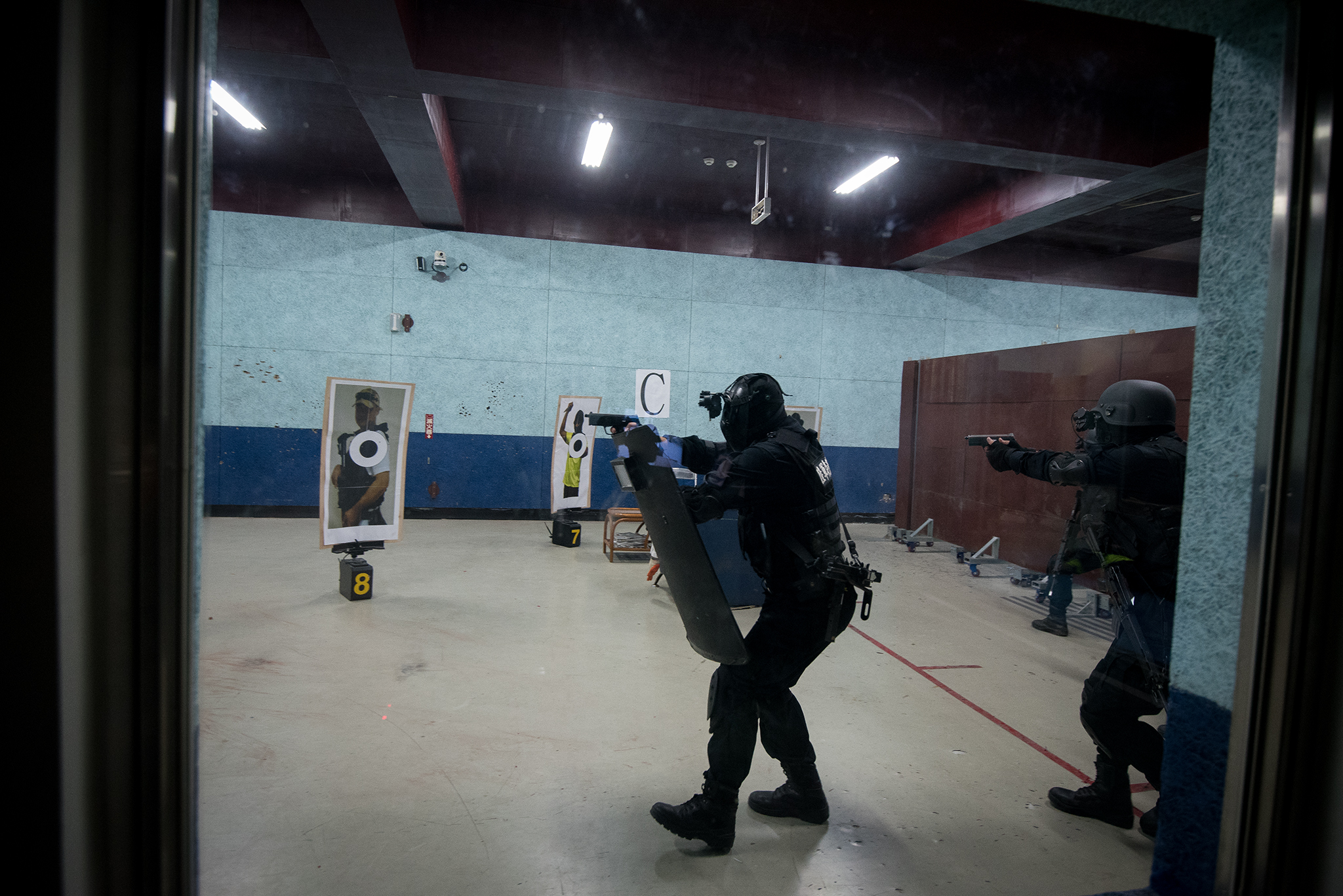
ROCA Special Force Team ASSC 2

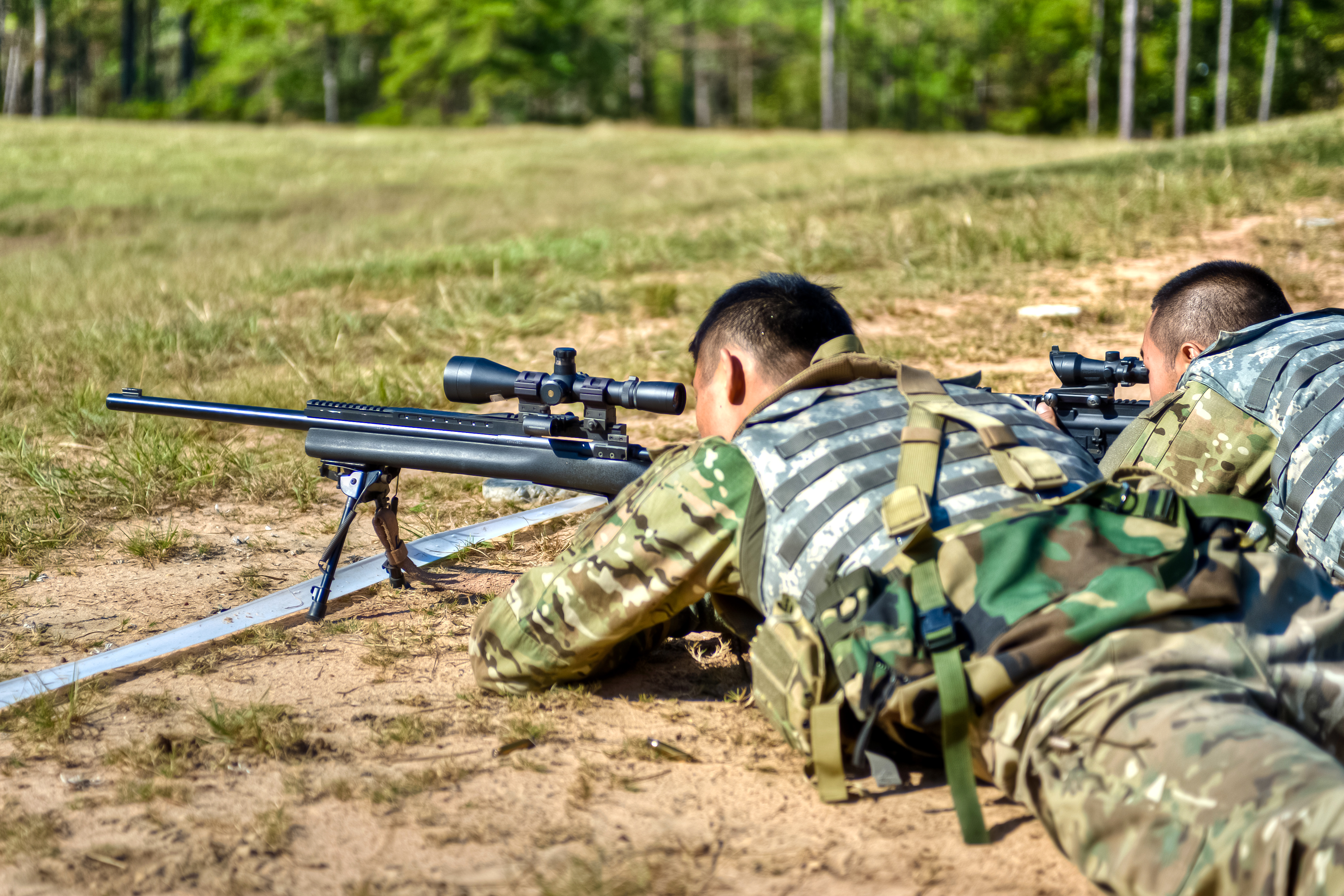
T-93 sniper rifle with the Taiwanese team competing in the International Sniper Competition at Fort Benning, Georgia in 2010

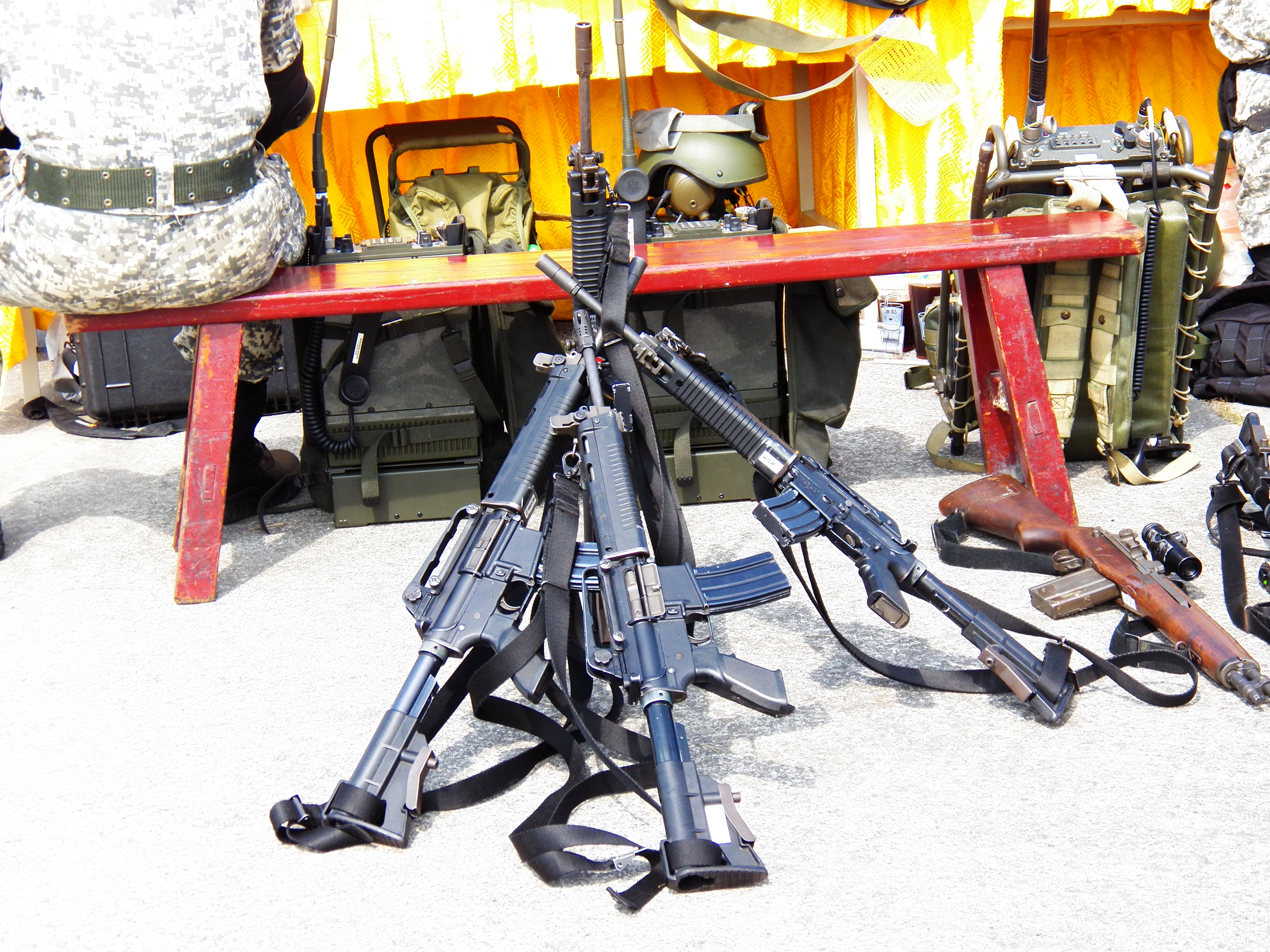
T91 rifles and M14

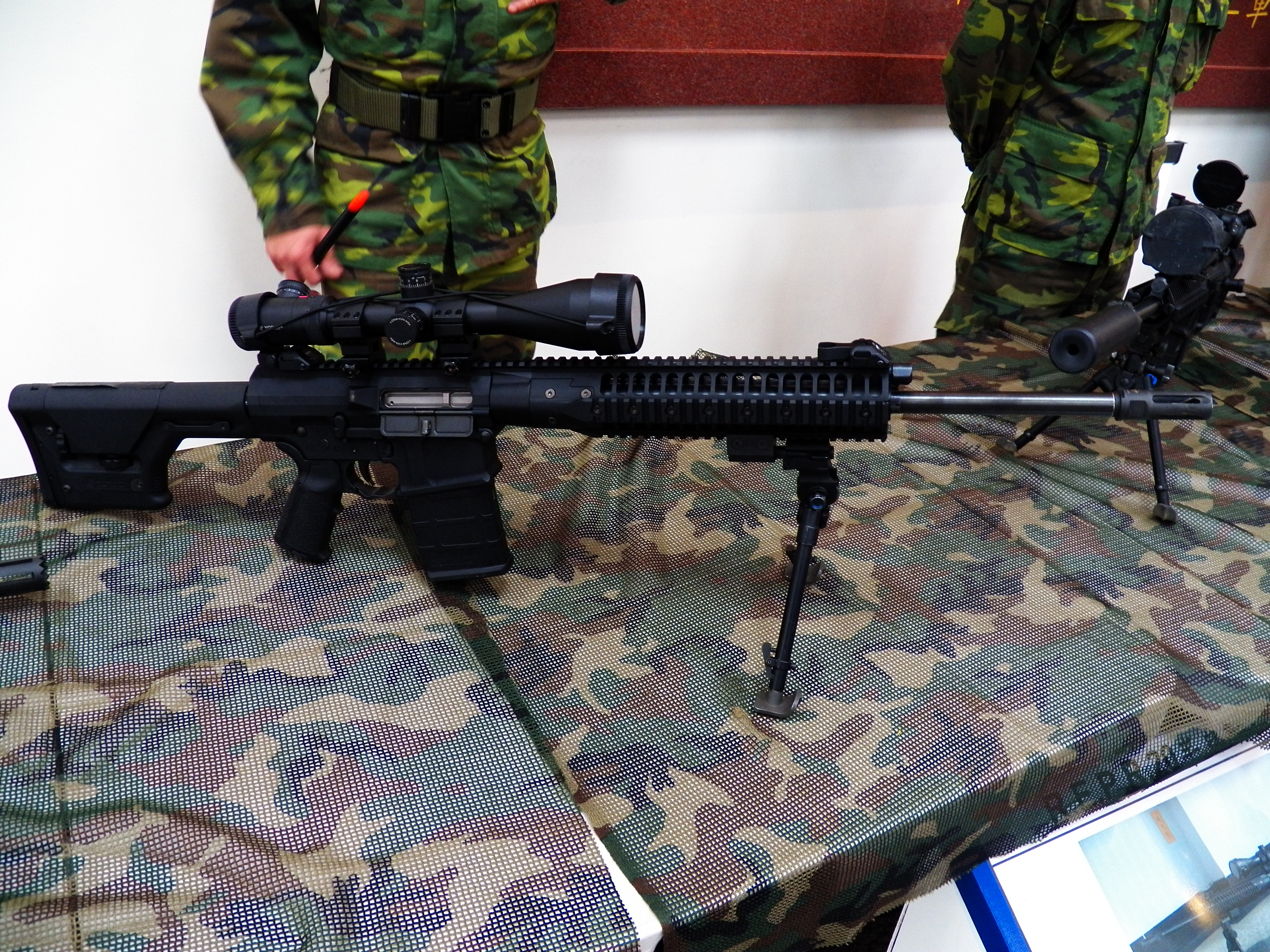
ROCA LWRCI R.E.P.R. 20 on display at the Armor School Museum

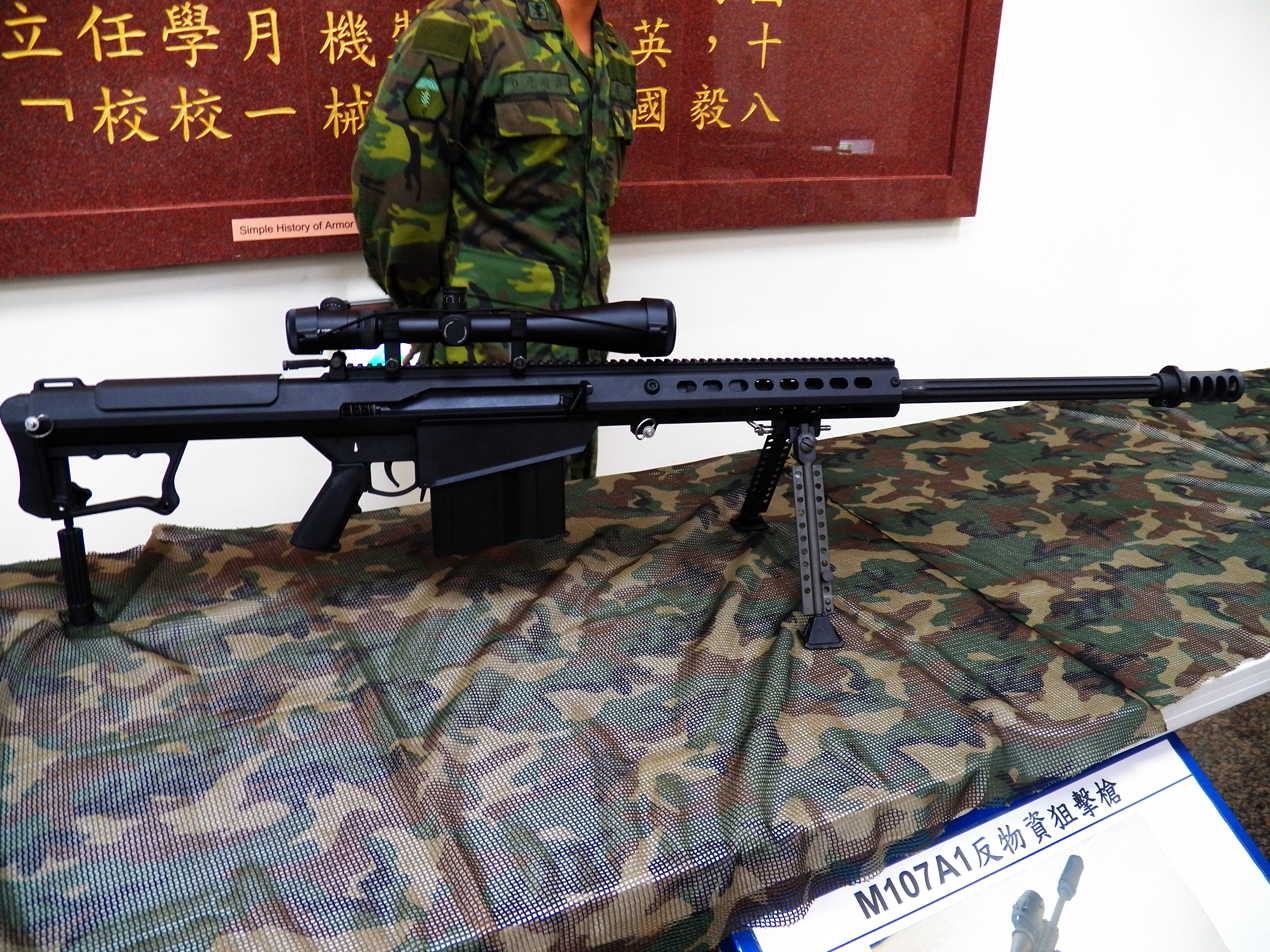
ROCA Barrett M107A1 Sniper Rifle Display in Armor School Museum

Name	Caliber Type	Photo	Origin	Notes
Handguns
T75K3	9×19mm Semi-automatic pistol		Italy Taiwan	Modeled after the Beretta 92. Standard infantry pistol since 2019.
T75K1	9×19mm Semi-automatic pistol		Italy Taiwan	Modeled after the Beretta 92. Used by military police.
T97 Hsing Hua	9×19mm Semi-automatic pistol		Austria Taiwan	Modeled after the Glock 19.
Glock 17	9×19mm Semi-automatic pistol		Austria	Used by special forces.
Glock 19	9×19mm Semi-automatic pistol		Austria	Used by special forces.
Glock 26	9×19mm Semi-automatic pistol		Austria	Used by special forces.
Steyr M	9×19mm Semi-automatic pistol		Austria	Used by special forces.
T51K1	.45 ACP Semi-automatic pistol		Taiwan	Modeled after the M1911A1. Former standard infantry pistol.
Colt M1911A1	.45 ACP Semi-automatic pistol		United States	Received through United States military aid during World War II.
T72 revolver	.38 revolver		United States/Taiwan	Modeled after the Smith & Wesson Model 10. Former standard infantry pistol.
Submachine guns
Type 77	9×19mm Submachine gun		Taiwan	
Heckler & Koch MP5A5	9×19mm Submachine gun		West Germany	Used in all branches of the armed forces.
IMI Uzi	9×19mm Submachine gun		Israel	
FN P90	FN 5.7x28mm Personal defense weapon		Belgium	
SIG Sauer MPX	9×19mm Submachine gun		United States	
Shotguns
Franchi SPAS-12	12-gauge Combat shotgun		Italy	
Benelli M4 Super 90	12-gauge Combat shotgun		Italy	
Mossberg 590A1	12-gauge Combat shotgun		United States	
Rifles
Type 24 Chiang-Kai-shek	7.92×57mm Mauser Bolt-action rifle		Weimar Republic China	Used as a ceremonial rifle. Modeled after the Mauser Standardmodell.
M1 Garand	.30-06 Springfield Semi-automatic rifle		United States	Used as a ceremonial rifle. Received through United States military aid.
Assault rifles and carbines
T112	5.56×45mm Assault rifle		Taiwan	The first batch of 25,000 will be purchased by the Republic of China Army in 2025. Estimated purchase 86,114 weapons ordered.
T91	5.56×45mm Assault rifle		Taiwan	Developed from the T86. Standard infantry rifle.
T91 CQC	5.56×45mm Assault rifle		Taiwan	Carbine version of the T91 rifle.
T65K1	5.56×45mm Assault rifle	TwT65	United States Taiwan	Similar to the AR-18. Former standard infantry rifle used by Army reserve forces since the early 2000s.
T65K2	5.56×45mm Assault rifle		United States Taiwan	Similar to the AR-18. Former standard infantry rifle used by Army reserve forces since the early 2000s but still used by the Navy and Air Force.
Colt M16A1 / M16A2	5.56×45mm Assault rifle		United States	Limited use only.
Colt M4A1 carbine	5.56×45mm Assault rifle, Carbine		United States	
Bushmaster M4 carbine	5.56×45mm Assault rifle, Carbine		United States	
Battle rifles
Type 57 rifle	7.62×51mm Battle rifle		United States Taiwan	License-produced M14. In storage.
Springfield M14	7.62×51mm Battle rifle		United States	Store for reserve forces. Received through United States military aid.
Sniper rifles
LWRC R.E.P.R. MKII	7.62×51mm Designated marksman rifle		United States	
Mk 14 Mod 0 EBR	7.62×51mm Designated marksman rifle		United States	
Remington M24 SWS	7.62×51mm Sniper rifle		United States	
T93 sniper rifle	7.62×51mm Sniper rifle		United States Taiwan	Is closely related to the M24 SWS.
T108 sniper rifle	7.62×51mm Sniper rifle		Taiwan	
SIG Sauer SSG 2000	7.62×51mm Sniper rifle		West Germany / Germany; Switzerland	
Heckler & Koch PSG1	7.62×51mm Sniper rifle		West Germany	
DSR-Precision DSR-1	.308 Winchester Sniper rifle		Germany	
Barrett M82A1	12.7×99mm Anti-Material rifle		United States	Used with Army Special Forces.
Barrett M107A1	12.7×99mm Anti-Material rifle		United States	Used with Army Special Forces.
T112 heavy sniper rifle	12.7×99mm Anti-Material rifle		Taiwan	Used with Army Special Forces.
Machine guns
M249 light machine gun	5.56×45mm Squad automatic weapon		United States; Belgium	
FN Minimi	5.56×45mm Squad automatic weapon		Belgium	
T75 light machine gun	5.56×45mm Squad automatic weapon		Belgium Taiwan	Developed with elements drawn from both the FN Minimi and T74 machine gun. Used by the military police, marine corps and air force.
Type 74 machine gun	7.62×51mm General-purpose machine gun		Belgium; United States Taiwan	Developed with elements drawn from the FN MAG .
M240 machine gun	7.62×51mm General-purpose machine gun		United States	
Type 90 machine gun	12.7×99mm Heavy machine gun		Taiwan	Modeled after the M2HB Browning.
M2HB Browning	12.7×99mm Heavy machine gun		United States	Received through United States military aid.
cannon
T-75 cannon	20 mm caliber autocannon Universal Support Firearms		Republic of China	The Lianli 205th Factory developed a general-purpose support weapon based on the American M39A3 cannon.
Grenade-based weapons
T85	40 mm grenade Grenade launcher		United States Taiwan	Standard grenade launcher for the T65 and T91 rifles, based on the American M203.
Milkor MGL Mk-1	40 mm grenade Grenade launcher		South Africa/ South Africa	
Springfield M79	40 mm grenade Grenade launcher		United States	Received through United States military aid.
Saco Mk-19 Mod 3	40 mm grenade Automatic grenade launcher		United States	Received through United States military aid.
T91 grenade launcher	40 mm grenade Automatic grenade launcher		United States Taiwan	Modeled after the Mk 19. Former standard infantry pistol.

== Electronics, optics and night sight systems ==
Name	Type	Image	Origin
TS113	Night-vision device		Republic of China
ROMEO5	Red dot Sight		Germany
TS112 4x Close-Range Scope	Advanced Combat Optical Gunsight		Republic of China
TS112 Reflex Red Dot Sight	Red dot Sight		Republic of China

== Watercraft ==
Platform	Origin	Manufacturer	Type	Notes
K85	Taiwan	Karmin international	8.7m rigid inflatable boat	More than 30 purchased, in service with Republic of China Army special forces.

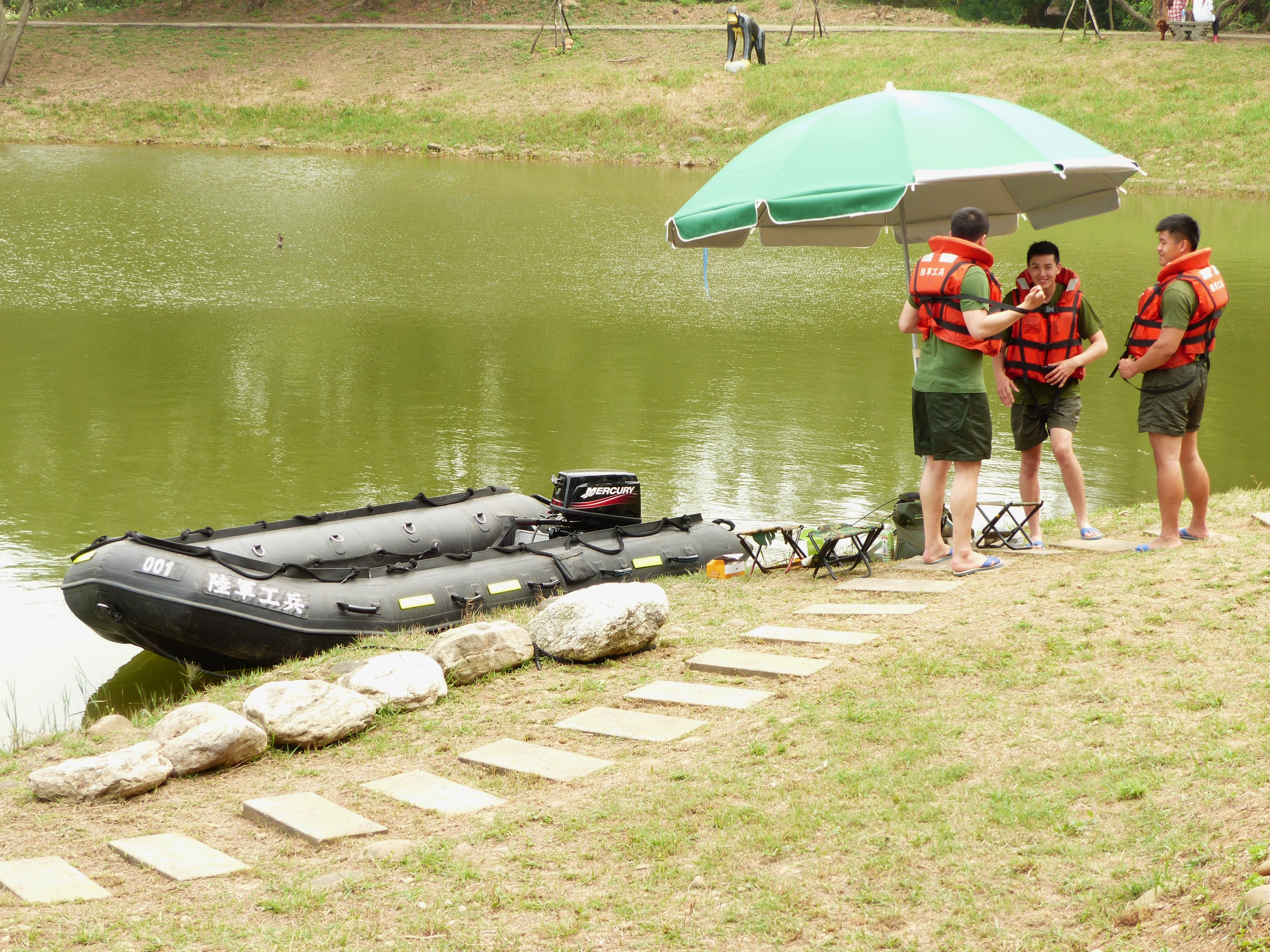
ROCA Engineers Motor Rubber Boat Display in Yeah Hsian Lake

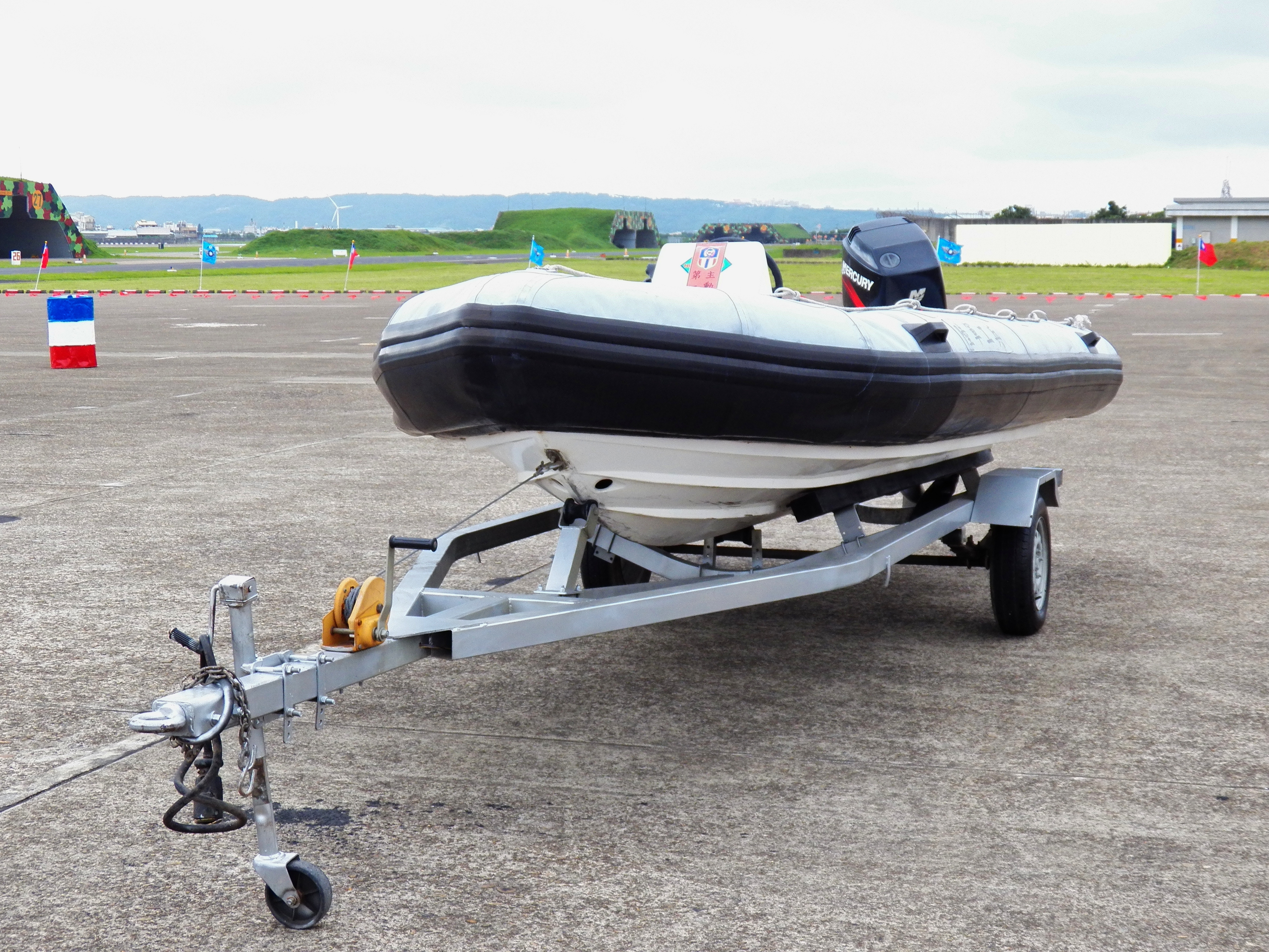
ROCA Engineers Chenggong Motorboat Display in Hsinchu AFB

== Armoured vehicles ==
Vehicle	Type	Image	Origin	In service	Notes
Main battle tanks (1018)
M1A2T Abrams	Main battle tank		United States	108	108 M1A2Ts ordered in total.
M60A3 TTS	Main battle tank		United States	460	Some have been transferred to the ROCMC. Undergoing system upgrade by NCSIST from 2022~2024.
CM11 Brave Tiger	Main battle tank		United States Republic of China	450	Assembled in Taiwan from 1988 to 1994, with a M48 turret fixed on a M60 chassis integrated with a M1A1 fire control system. Certain armoured battalions equipped with the CM11 will have them replaced by the Abrams tank.
Armored vehicles
CM32	Infantry fighting vehicle/ Armored personnel carrier		Taiwan; Ireland	378 CM32 & CM33; 305 CM34	In 2018, first batch of 378 CM32 and CM33 vehicles was completed and a second batch of 284 CM34 vehicles was ordered. In August 2020 another 21 CM34 vehicles was ordered for the military police. Platform will be further developed into a mobile gun system, a self-propelled howitzer and a Nuclear, Biological, Chemical, Reconnaissance Vehicle (NBCRV).
CM21	Armored personnel carrier		United States Taiwan	1025+ CM21	Various variants produced from 1982 to 2009. CM21/A1 armored personnel carrier CM22 mortar carrier for 107mm/120 mm mortar CM23 mortar carrier for 81 mm mortar CM25 TOW launcher CM26 command vehicle
M113	Armoured personnel carrier		United States	650	M113A1/A2
CM26	Armored Command Post Carrier		Taiwan		
M88	Armored recovery vehicle		United States	51	37 M88A1 variants. An additional 14 M88A2 ordered in 2019.
M9	Combat engineering vehicle		United States	19	
AAV-7A1	Amphibious armored personnel carrier		United States	90 (78 personnel, 6 command and 4 recovery variants) + 1 AAV turret trainer	Serving in Republic of China Marine Corps, replaces the LVTP-5 and LVT H6.
V-150S Commando	Armored personnel carrier		United States	300	In use with Southern Army Group, 333rd Mechanised Infantry Brigade.

== Other vehicles ==
Vehicle	Type	Image	Origin	In service	Notes
Trucks
M35 series 2½-ton 6×6 cargo truck	2½-ton heavy truck		United States		
M939 series 5-ton 6×6 truck	5 tons heavy truck		United States		
Navistar 7400	3.5 tons 4WD heavy truck		United States Taiwan	4,788	Produced under license by Sanyang Motor Co., Ltd. Based on Navistar 7000 series.
FMTV M1088	FMTV truck		United States	-	Towed the missile launcher.
FMTV M1084A2	Ammunition supply truck		United States	-	Purchased along with the M142 HIMARS.
FMTV M1089A2	Wrecker truck		United States	-	Purchased along with the M142 HIMARS.
Mercedes-Benz Arocs 3345	Combat engineer dump truck		Germany	84	
Mercedes-Benz Atego	Chassis platform		Germany		Use as chassis platform for various vehicles.
Oshkosh M1070	Tank transporter		United States	16	Purchased along with the M1A2T.
MAN TGS 6x4 Fuel Tanker Truck	Tanker		United States	54	
Light utility vehicles
Humvee	Light utility vehicle		United States	9,500+	Multiple variants, including ones carrying local made machine guns and TOW 2A launchers, along with various other weapons.
Jeep J8	Light utility vehicle		United States Taiwan	3,598	Multiple variants, Type A soft top, Type B soft top with machine gun, Type C hard top. Produced by Sanyang Motor Co., Ltd. Manufacturing.
Tactical all-terrain vehicles
SC-09A 4WD Special combat Assault Vehicle(SAV)	Light tactical all-terrain vehicle/Scout car		Taiwan	56	In use with ROC Army Aviation and Special Forces.
Amphibious bridging vehicles
M3 Amphibious Rig	Amphibious bridging vehicle		Germany	22	In use with Northern Army Group, 53 Engineering Battalion.
M48A5Armoured vehicle-launched bridge	Armoured vehicle-launched bridge		United States	12	In use in 52,53 and 54 Engineering Battalion.

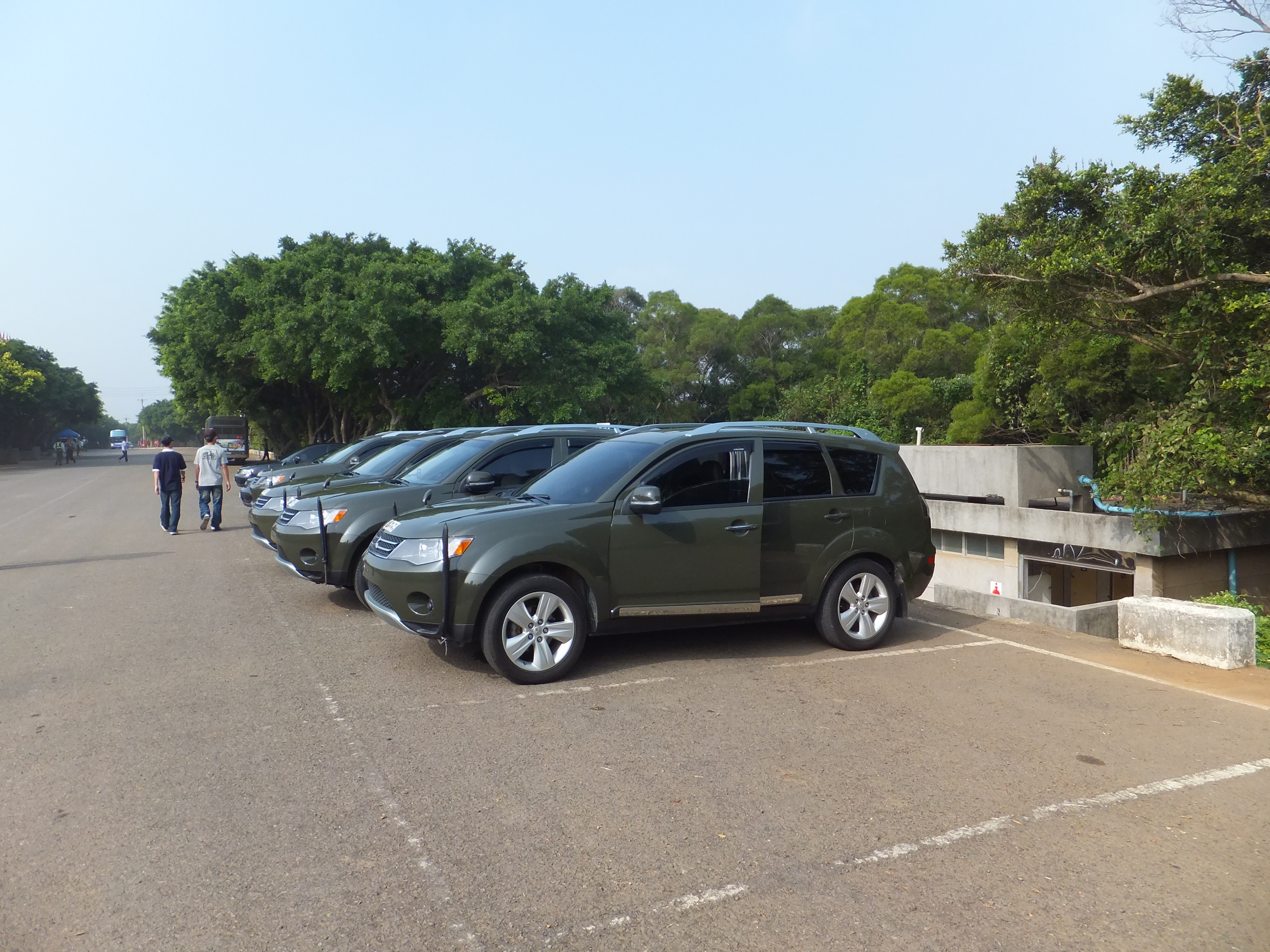
Mitsubishi Outlander SUVs in ROCA service

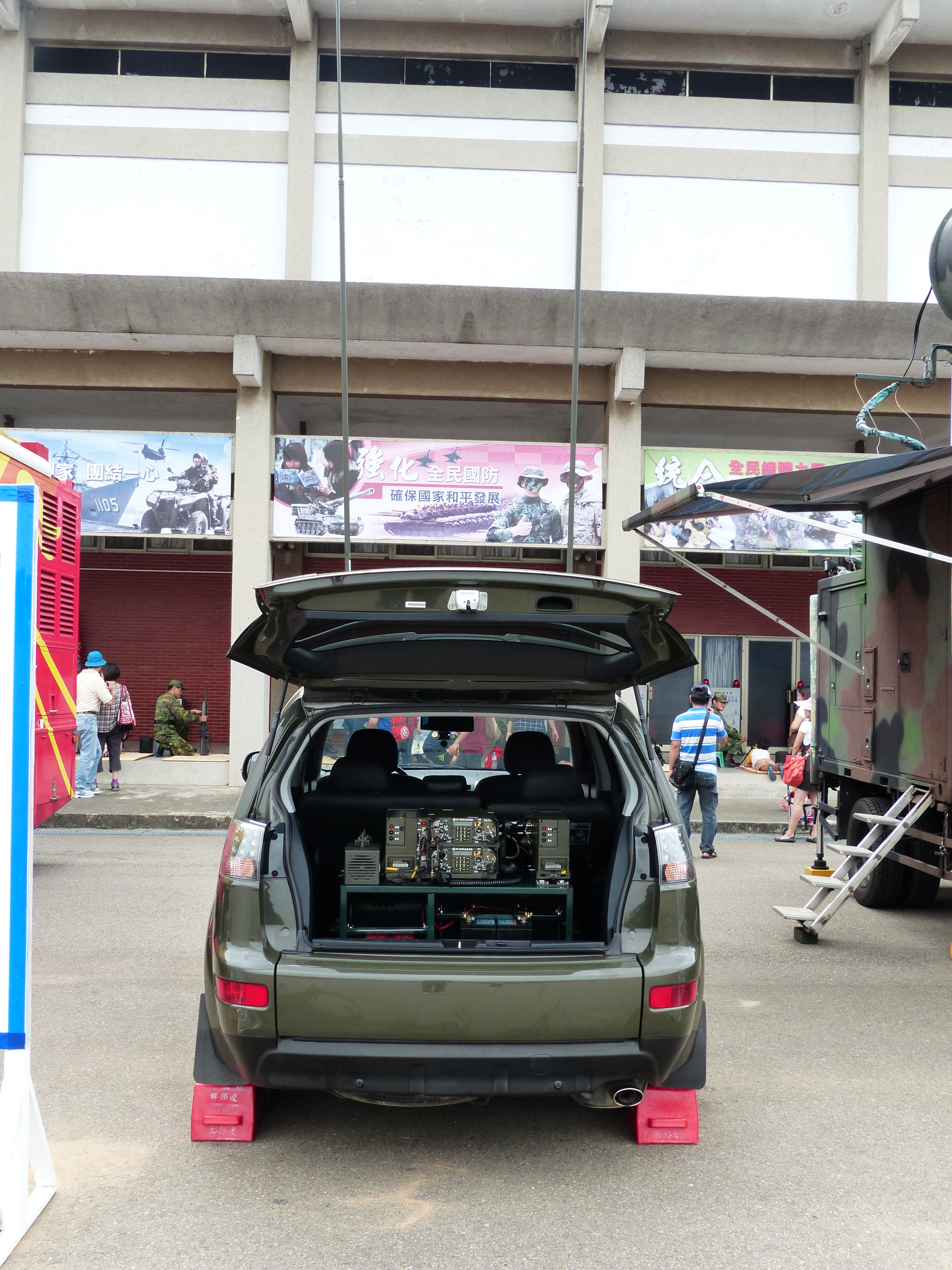
ROCA Emergency Command Car

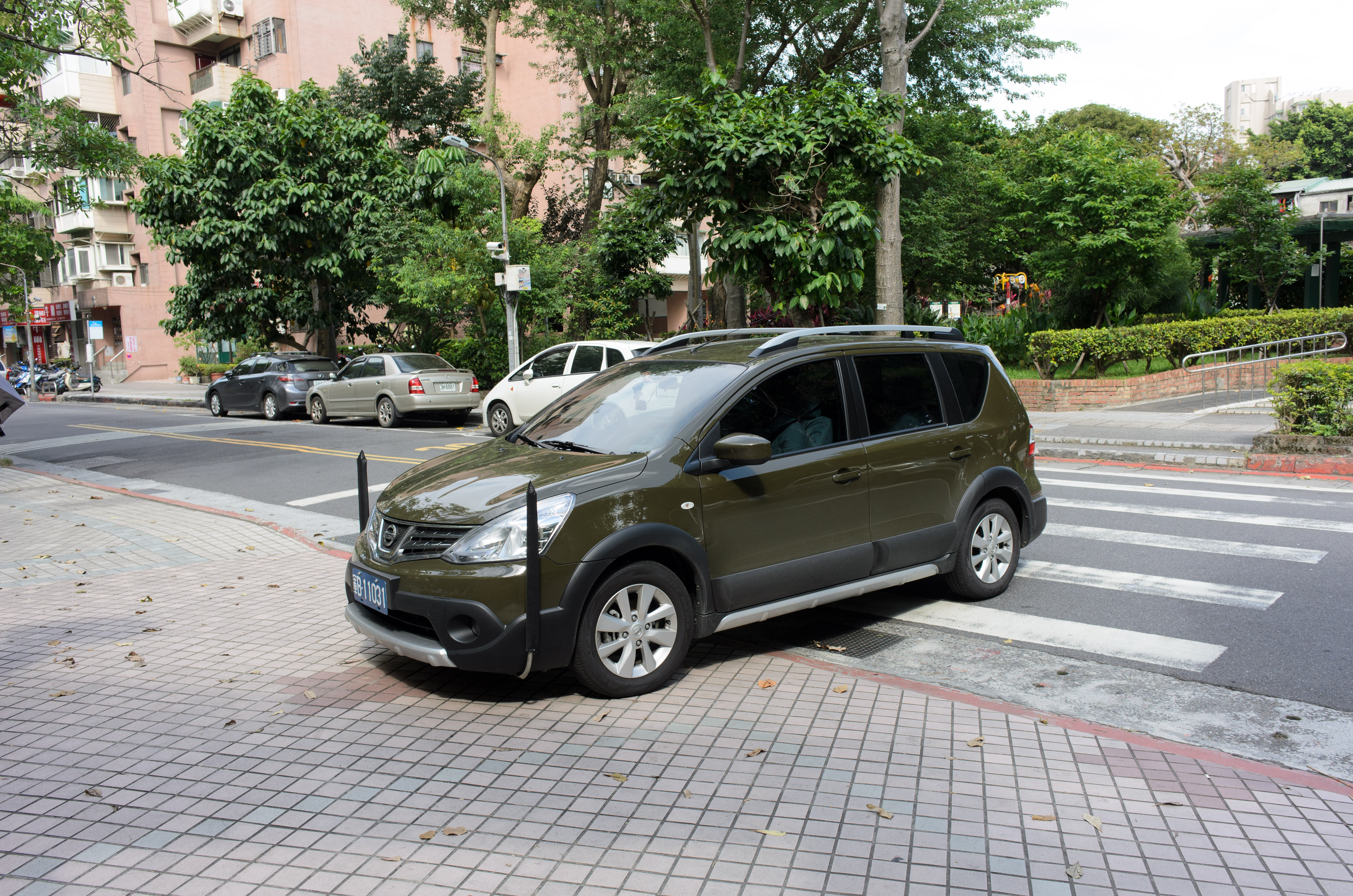
ROCA Nissan Livina X-Gear

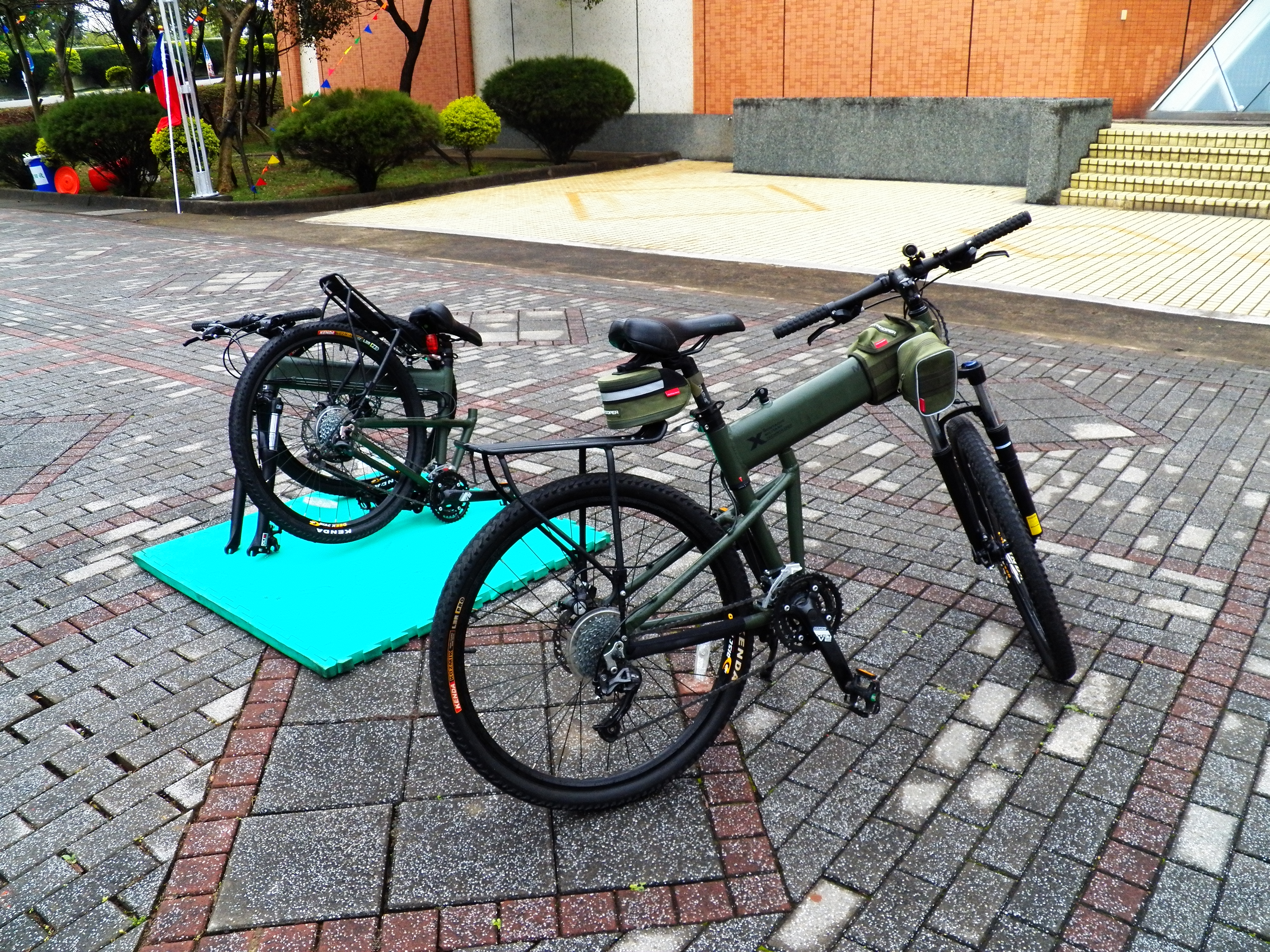
ROCA Folding Bicycles

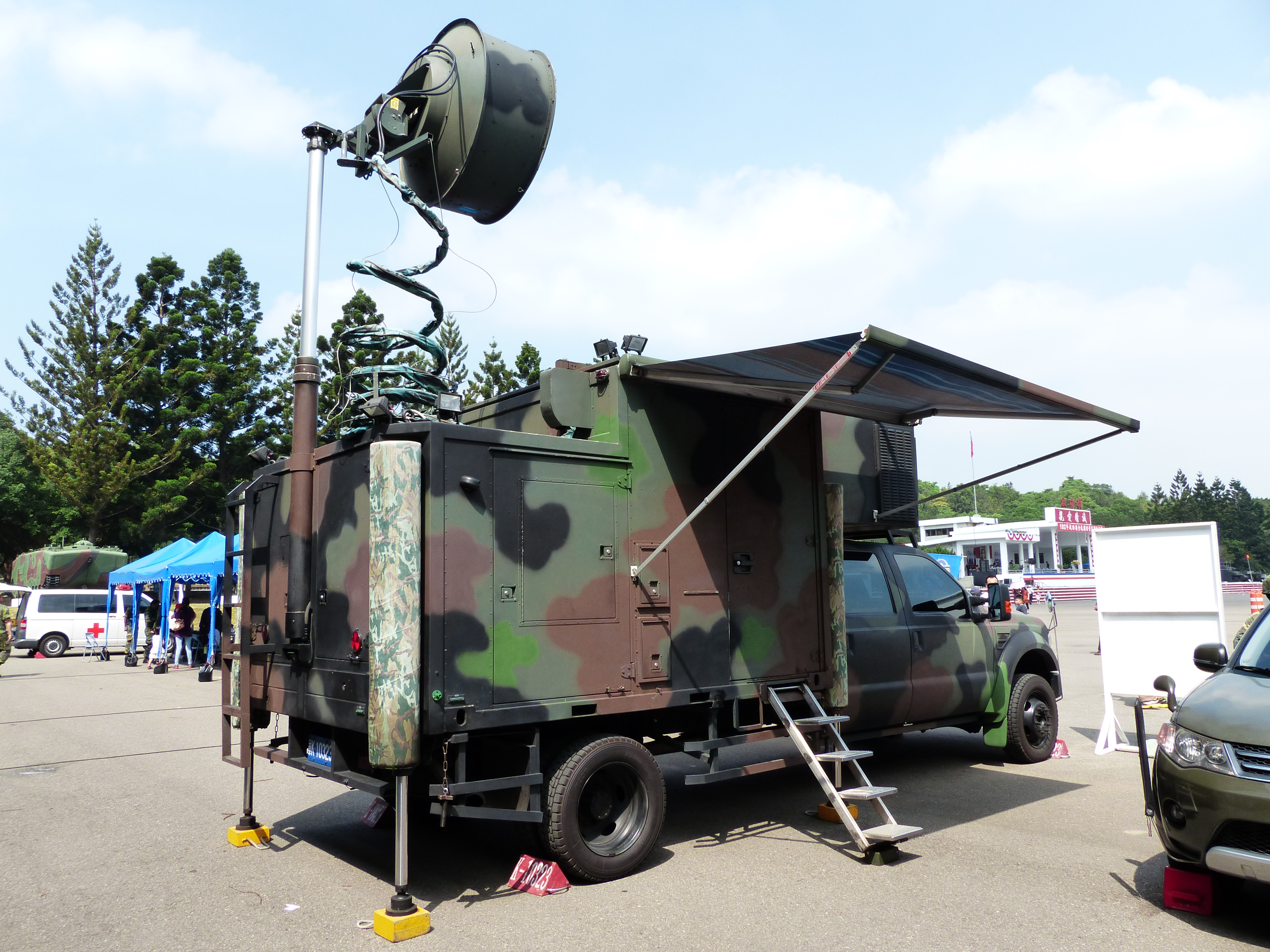
ROCA Microwave Broadcasting Van

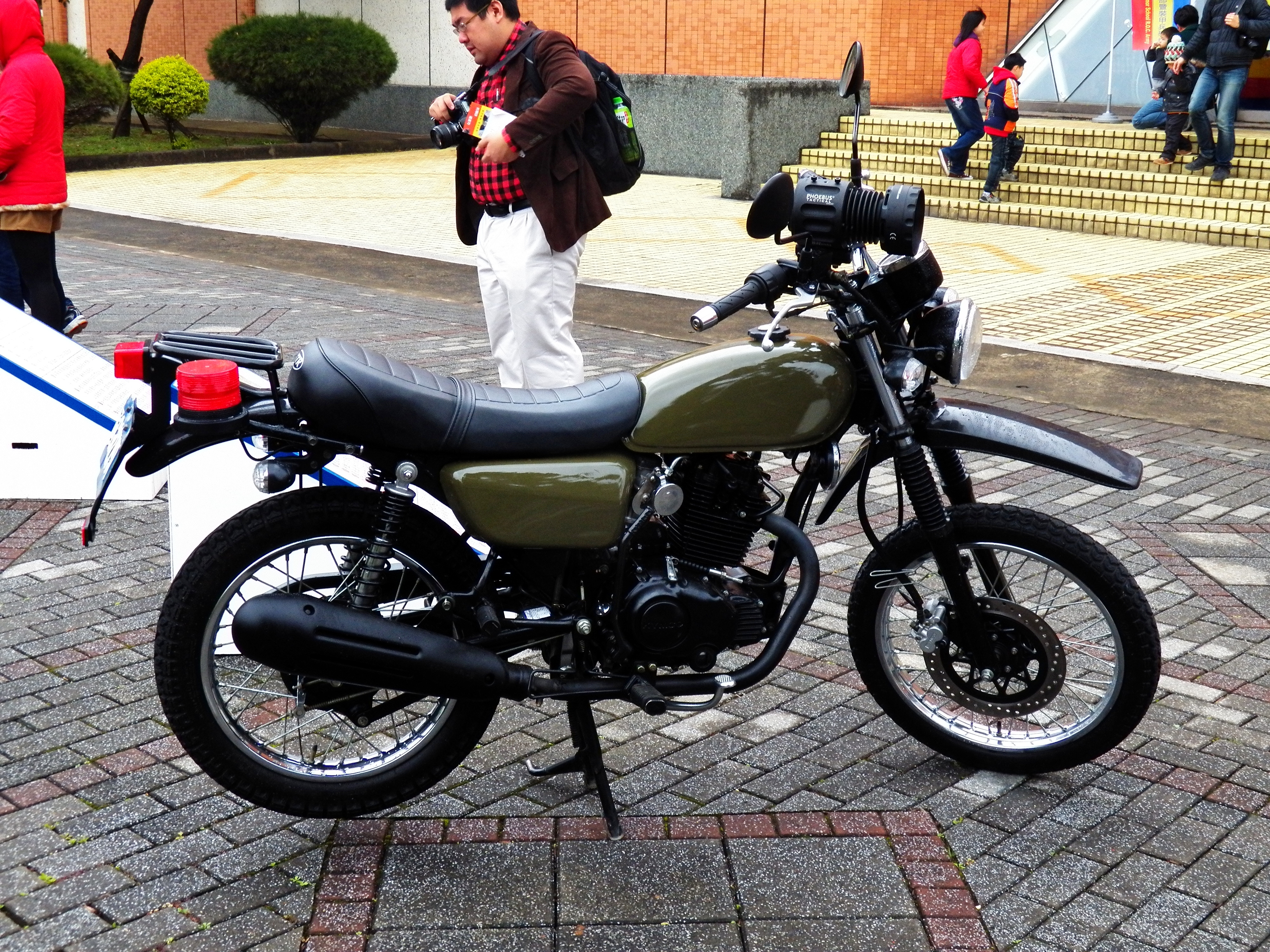
ROCA Kymco KTR125

== Artillery ==
Weapon	Caliber Type	Image	Origin	In service	Notes
Towed Artillery (1173)
M115	203mm towed howitzer		United States	70	
M59A2	155mm towed howitzer		United States	30	
M114A1	155mm towed howitzer		Republic of China	250	
T-65 155 mm howitzer	155mm towed howitzer		Republic of China	203	Locally produced, licensed, version of the M114A1 howitzer.
M101A1(T-63)	105mm towed howitzer	10.02_總統慰勉「陸軍機械化步兵第269旅」，並視導操演整備_(37416415862)	United States Republic of China	650	Locally produced, licensed, version of the M101 howitzer.
Self-propelled artillery (295)
M109	155 mm self-propelled howitzer		United States	225	M109A2/A5
M110A2	203mm self-propelled howitzer		United States	70	
Multiple rocket launcher (111)
M142 HIMARS	wheeled MRLS		United States	11	On 21 October 2020, the United States government approved the sale of 11 HIMARS to Taiwan. Another 18 are ordered since the cancellation of 40 M109A6. Additional 18 launchers will be purchased due to the cancellation of M109A6 howitzer orders. The first batch of 11 launchers were delivered in November. On 17 December 2025, the United States government approved the sale of 82 HIMARS to Taiwan.
RT/LT-2000	117mm, 180mm, or 227mm wheeled multiple rocket launcher system		Republic of China	100	
Mortars
T-75	60 mm mortar		Republic of China	??	Modeled after the M224 mortar.
T-75	81 mm mortar		Republic of China	??	Modeled after the M29 mortar.
M29	81 mm mortar		United States	160+	
M30	107 mm mortar		United States	?	
T-63	120 mm mortar		Republic of China	700+	
CM23	81 mm mortar carrier		Republic of China		
M125	81 mm mortar carrier		United States	72	
M106A2	107mm mortar carrier		United States	90	
CM22	107mm/120mm mortar carrier		Republic of China		
Counter-battery radar
AN/TPQ-37 Firefinder radar	Counter-battery radar		United States		
INS/GPS Integrated Land Navigation System
ULISS-30 Positioning and Azimuth Determination System, PADS	Positioning and Azimuth Determination System		France		
Synchronized Position Attitude/Azimuth Navigation System 7（SPAN-7）	Positioning and Azimuth Determination System		Republic of China		

== Helicopters and unmanned aerial vehicle ==
Aircraft	Variant	Type	Image	Origin	In service
Helicopters (168)
AH-64 Apache Guardian	AH-64E	Attack helicopter		United States	29
AH-1 SuperCobra	AH-1W	Attack helicopter		United States	61
OH-58 Kiowa	OH-58D	Light observation helicopter		United States	37
CH-47 Chinook	CH-47SD	Heavy transport helicopter		United States	8
UH-60 Black Hawk	UH-60M	Utility helicopter		United States	30
Bell 206	TH-67A Creek	Training helicopter		United States	30
Unmanned aerial vehicles
NCSIST Albatross	Medium recon unmanned aerial vehicle			Taiwan	32
NCSIST Cardinal II	Small recon unmanned aerial vehicle			Taiwan	30
NCSIST Capricorn	Unmanned aerial vehicle			Taiwan	~300
Altius-600M	Unmanned aerial vehicle			United States	291
Switchblade 300	Unmanned aerial vehicle			United States	Unknown, 685 ordered in 2024

== Anti-aircraft weapons ==
Platform	Type	Origin	In service	Notes
AIM-9 Sidewinder	Air-to-air missile	United States	300	AIM-9S. Carried by AH-1W.
AIM-92 Stinger	Air-to-air missile	United States	173	Block I, ordered for AH-64E Longbow attack helicopters.
Surface-to-air TC-2	Medium-range surface-to-air missile	Taiwan	29 (mobile missile launchers)	Six batteries and 246 missiles service in 2023.
Antelope	Short-range surface-to-air missile	Taiwan	??	Mounts four TC-1L interceptors.
M1097 Avenger (AN/TWQ-1)	Self-propelled anti-aircraft weapon	United States	74	In service with Northern and Central Army Group only, came with 1299 Stingers purchased in the same deal.
Dual Mounted Stinger	Short-range surface-to-air missile	United States	116	55 Stinger DMS launchers with 465 RMP rounds, from the United States Army stockpile and rebuilt/refurbished, sold to Taiwan May 1996 for 80 million. 61 Stinger DMS launchers with 728 rounds, delivered between 1996 and 1998 for 180 million, some transferred to ROCMC Additional ex-US service Stingers delivered in May 2023 under the Presidential Drawdown Authority.
FIM-92 Stinger	Man-portable air-defense system	United States	1,800+	250 Stinger Block-1-92 ordered in 2018 and an additional 254 Stinger Block-1-92F in 2019.
CS/MPQ-90 Bee Eye	Active electronically scanned array radar	Republic of China	23	Integrated with Avenger and Antelope batteries from 2010. Six on order as of 2019. Use in Surface-to-Air TC-2 Six order in 2019.
CS/MPQ-112X	Active electronically scanned array radar	Republic of China	11	It was developed and modified from "CS/MPQ-90 Bee Eye". The CS/MPQ-112X radar will be delivered to the Army in batches from 2022 to 2026.
T-82T cannon	autocannon	Republic of China	？ ？	Twin Anti-Aircraft Cannon

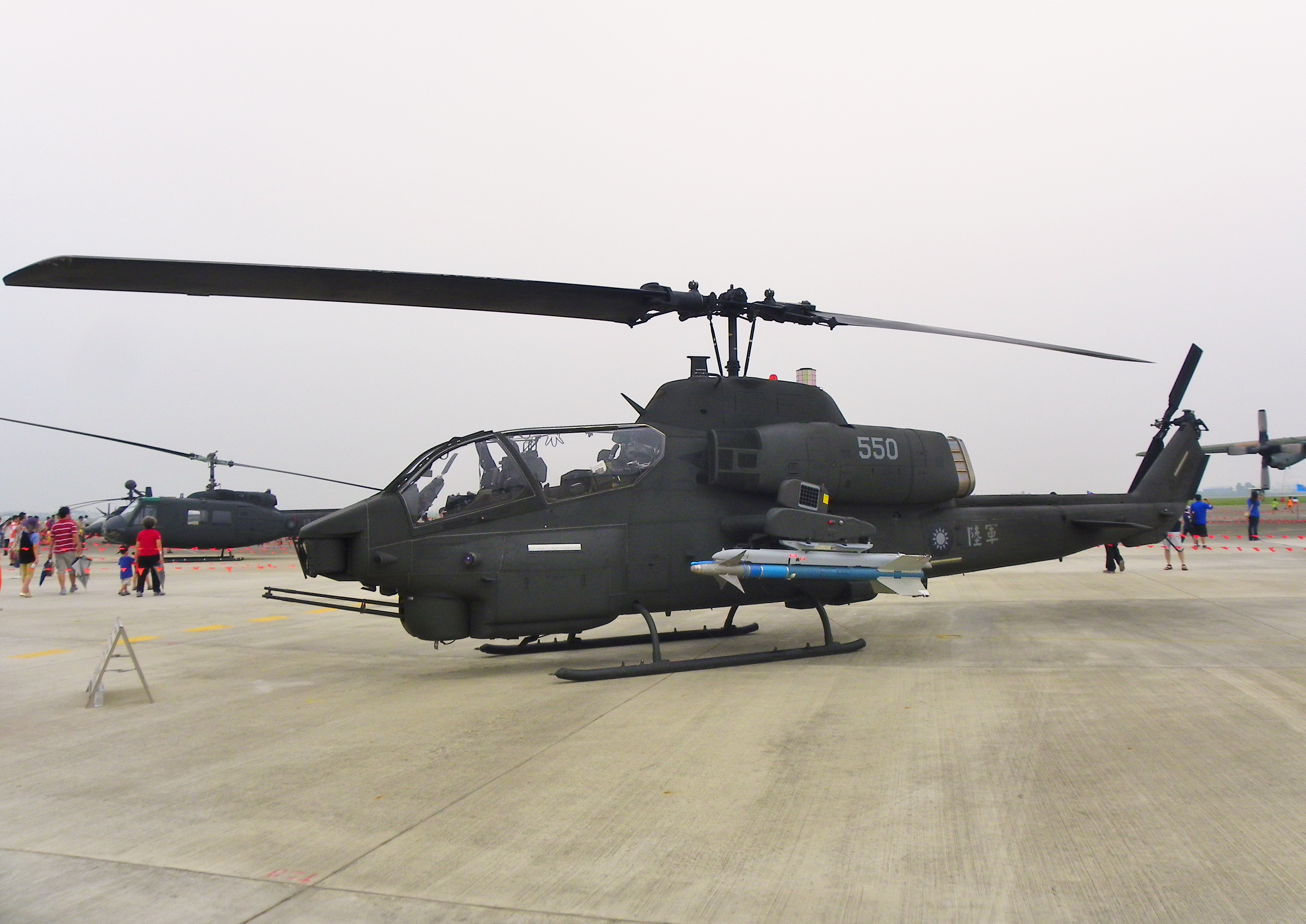
ROCA AH-1W armed with an AIM-9 Sidewinder Missile

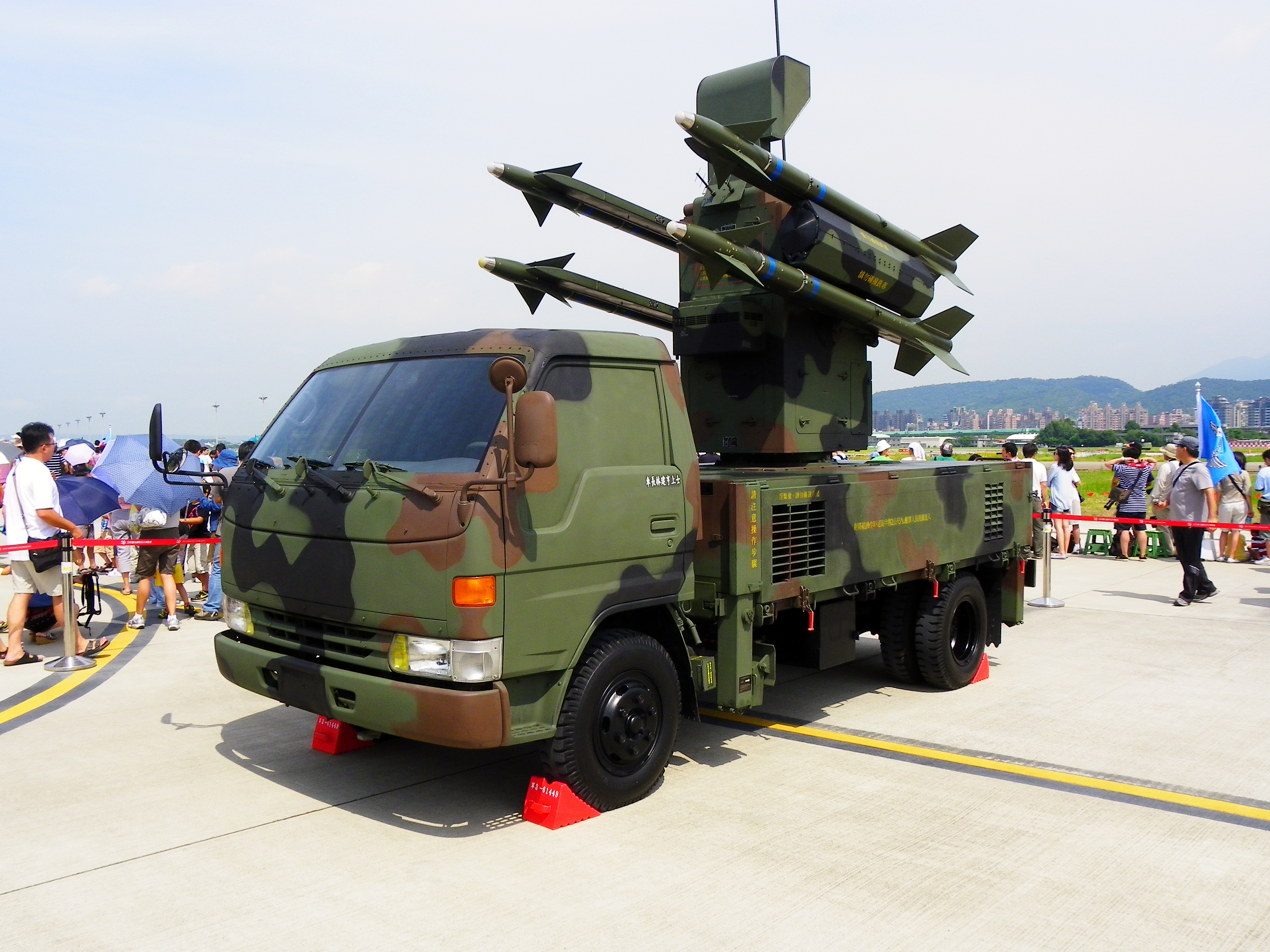
Antelope air defence system

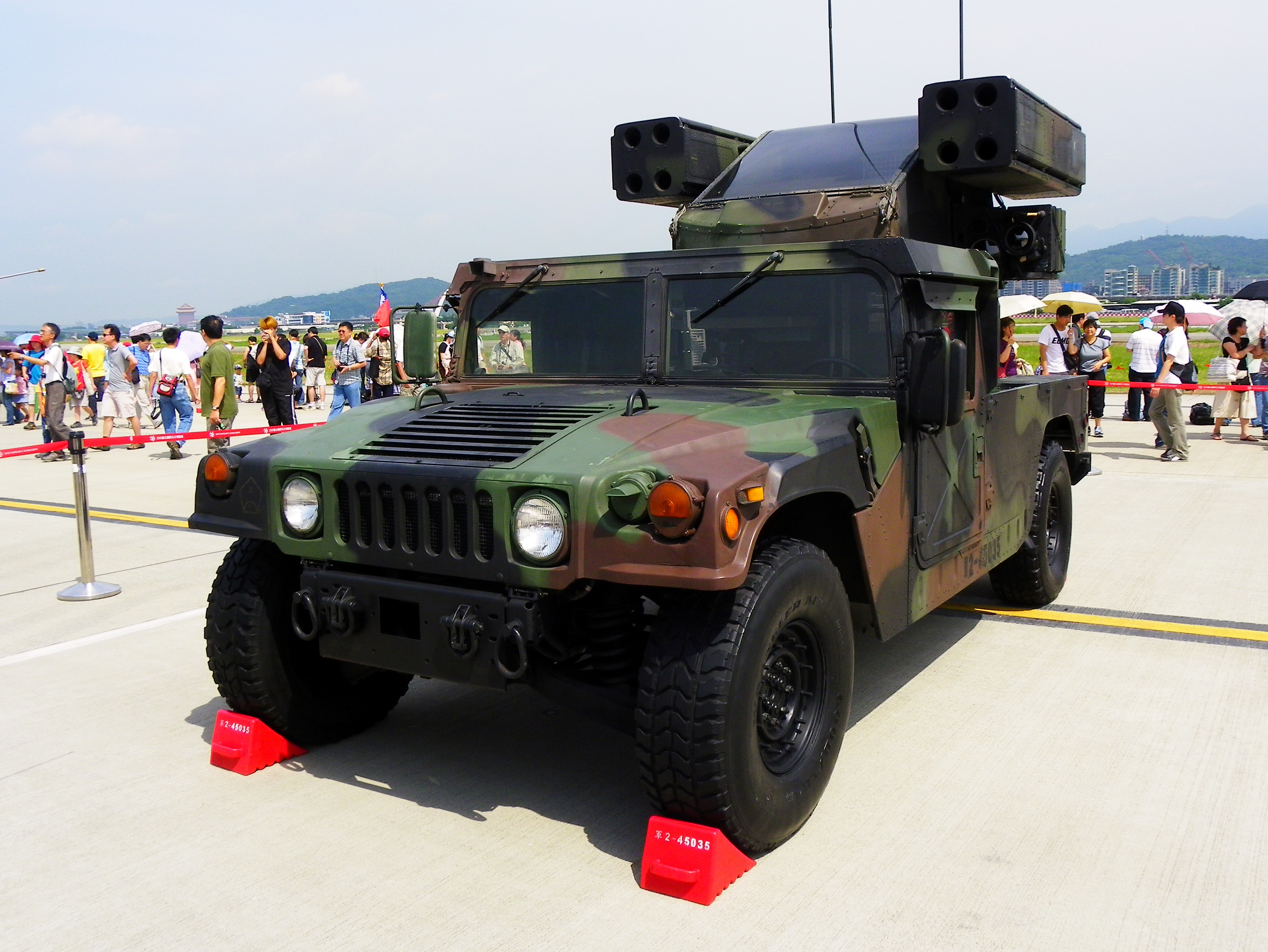
AN/TWQ-1 Avenger

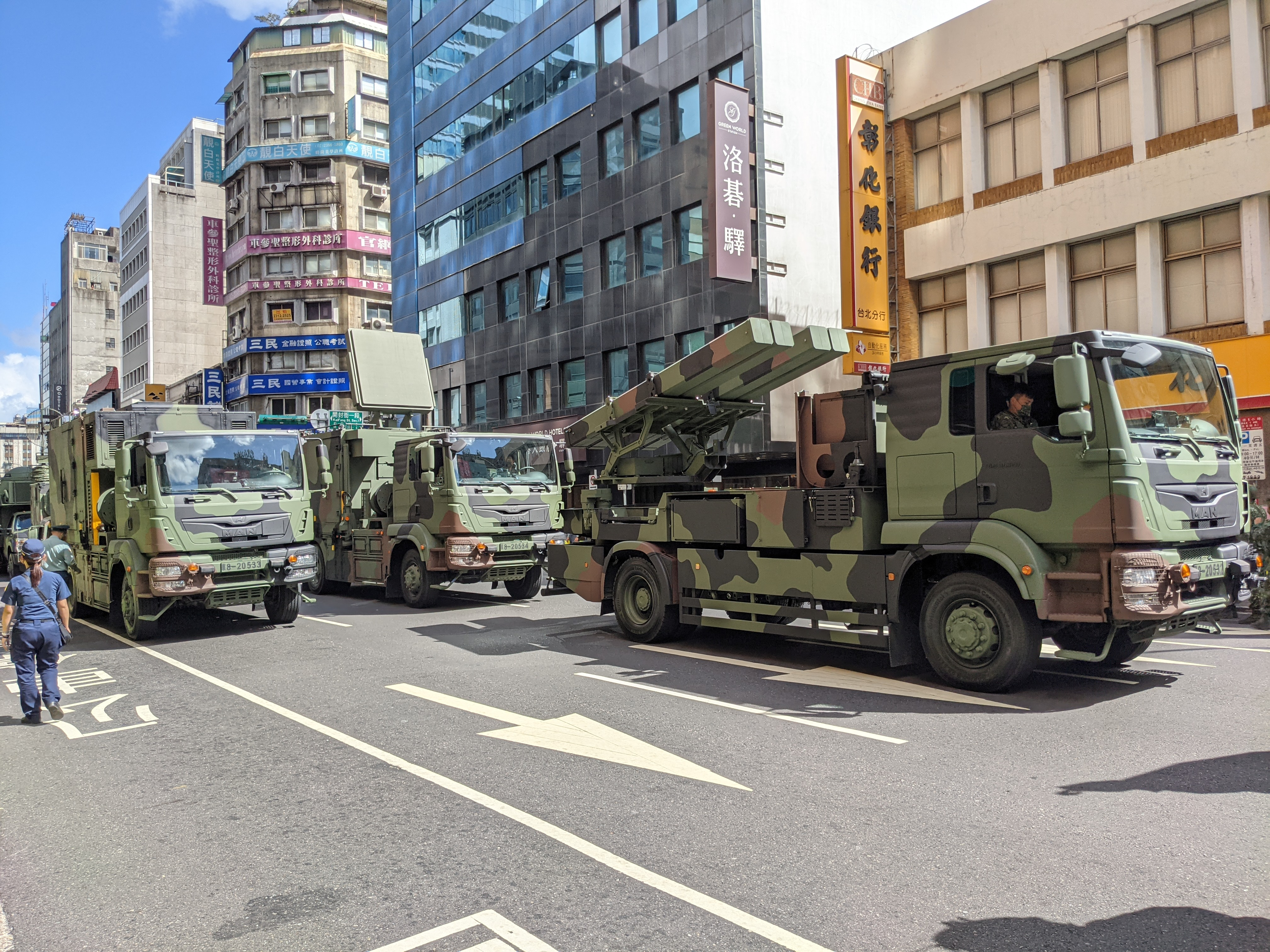
Sky Sword II (TC-2) Carried by wheeled trucks

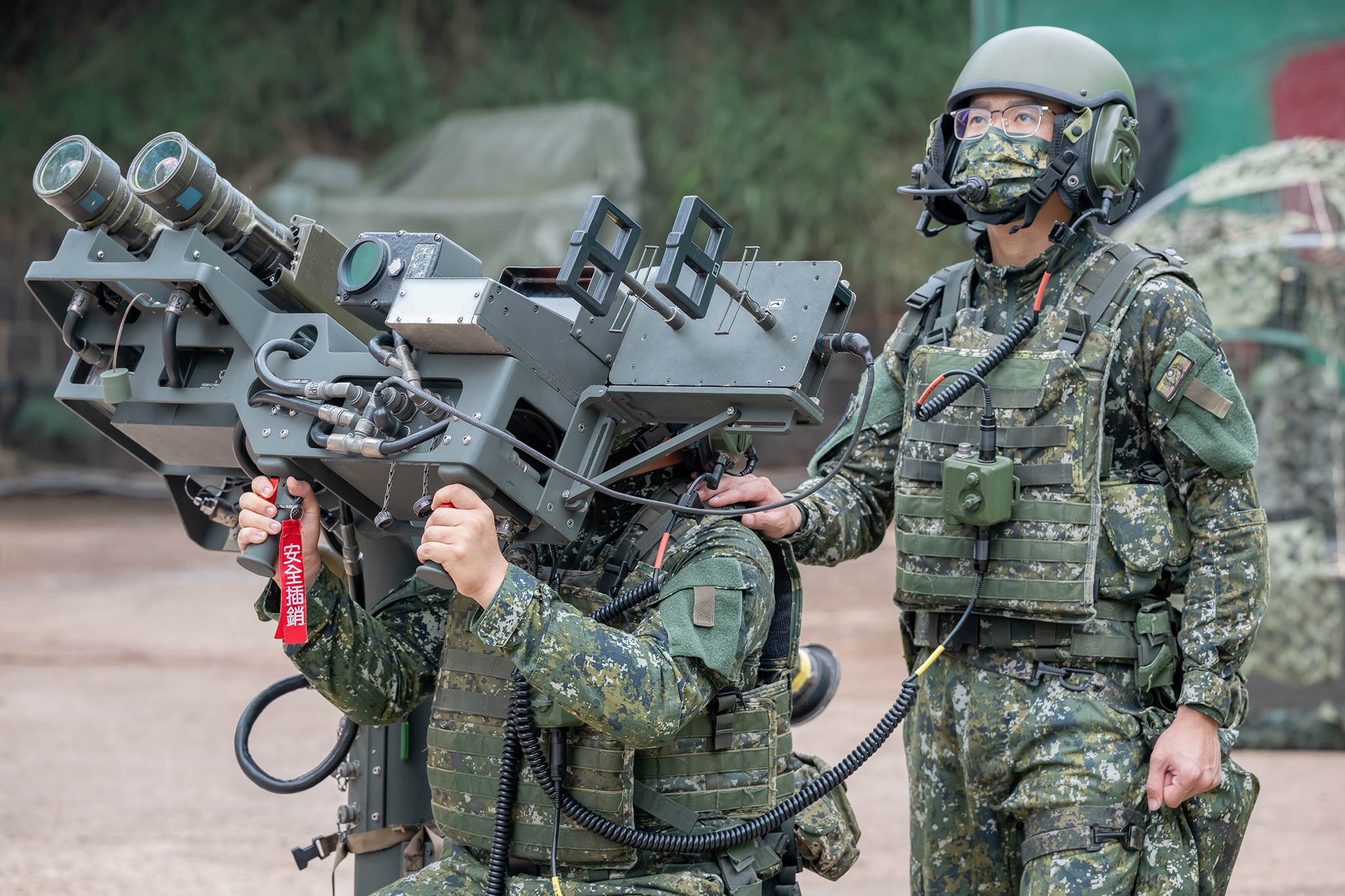
multiple Stinger missile launcher demonstration on Penghu Defense Command Air Defense Company

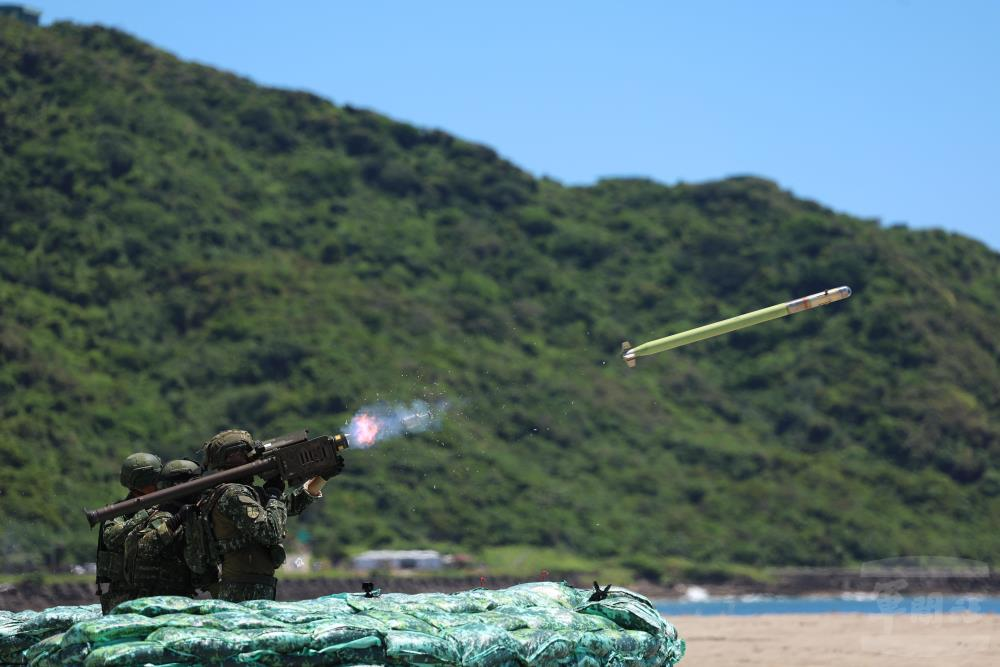
FIM-92 Stinger launch

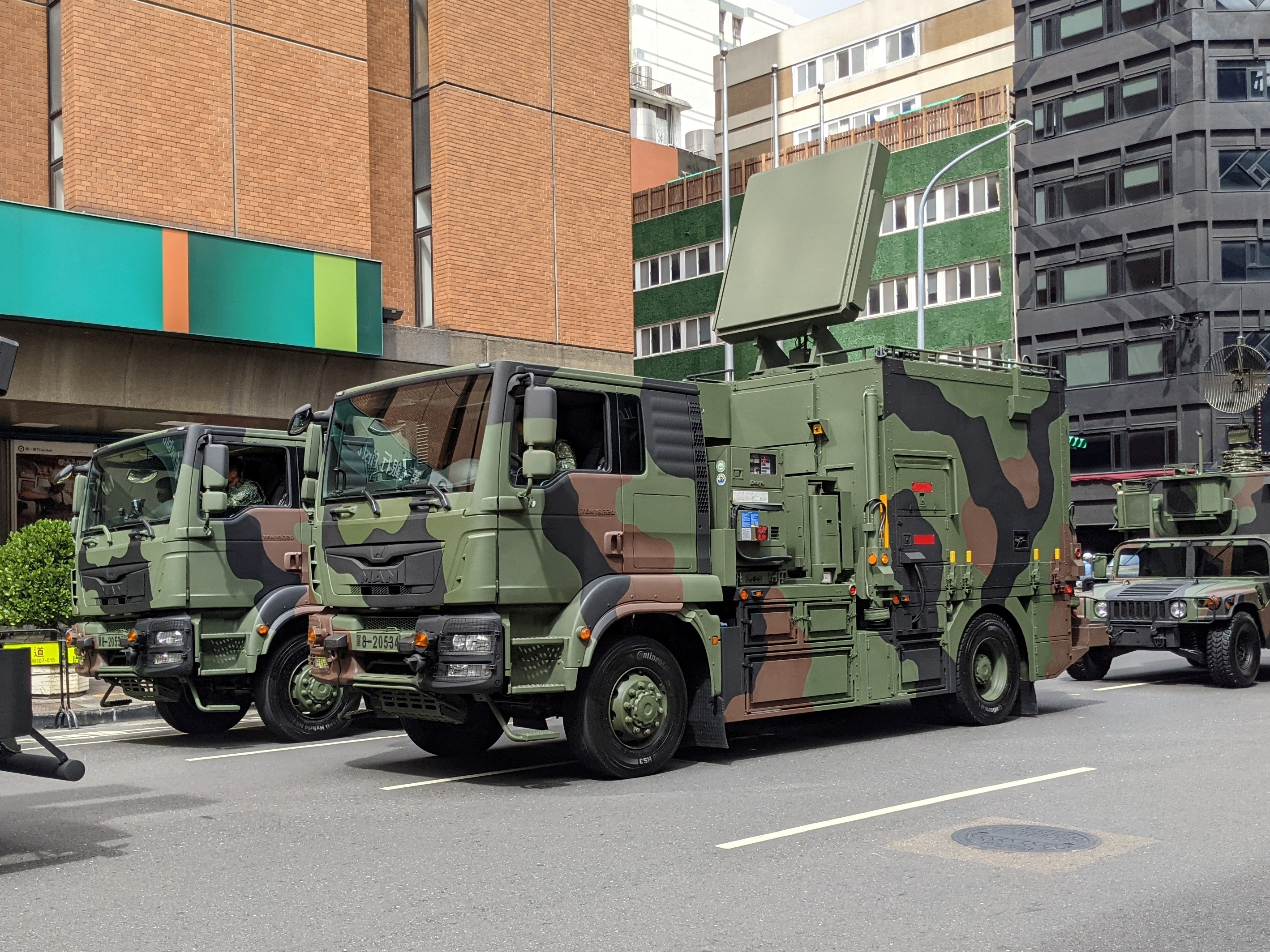
CS/MPQ-90 Bee Eye

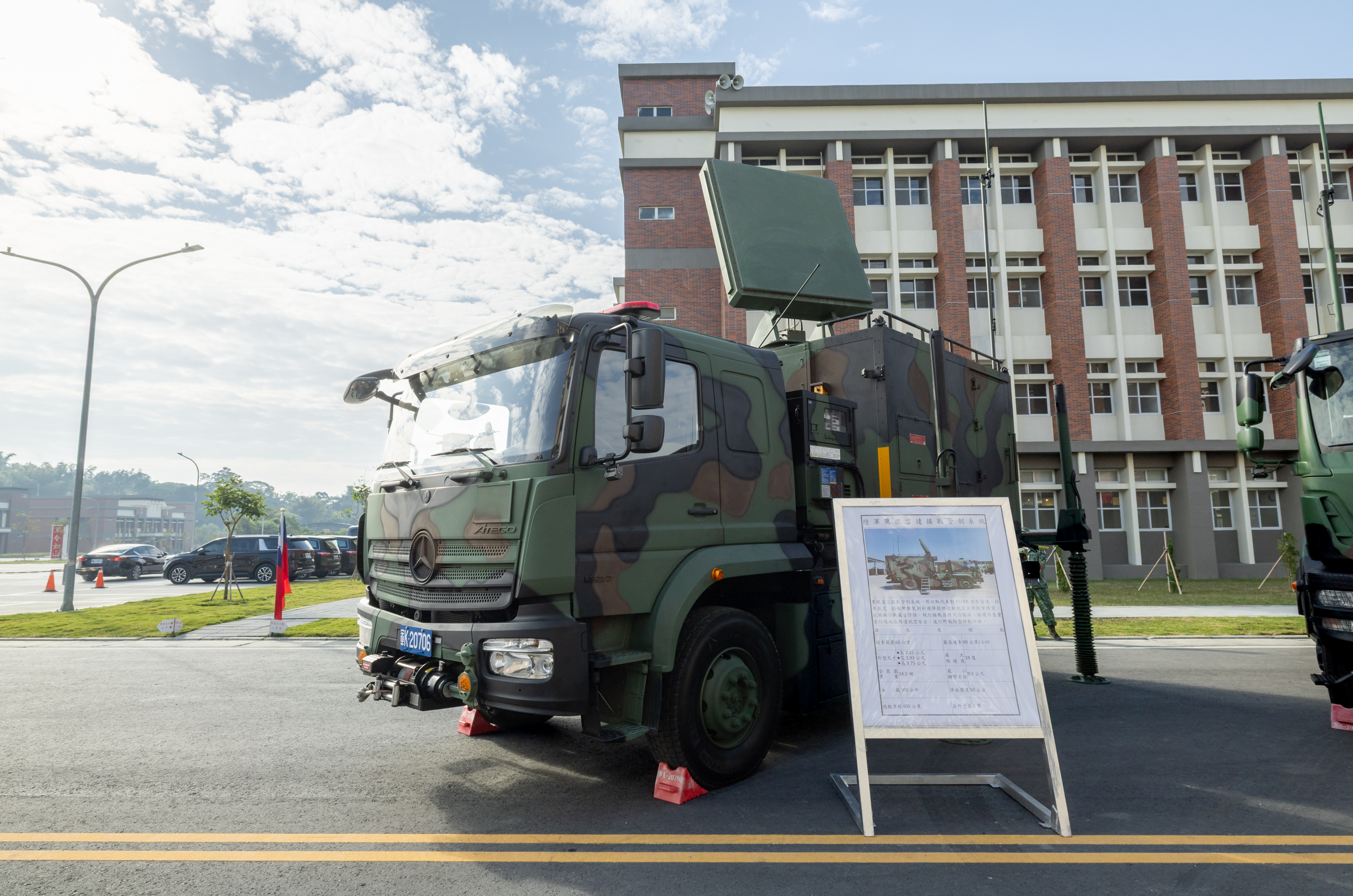
CS/MPQ-112X radar

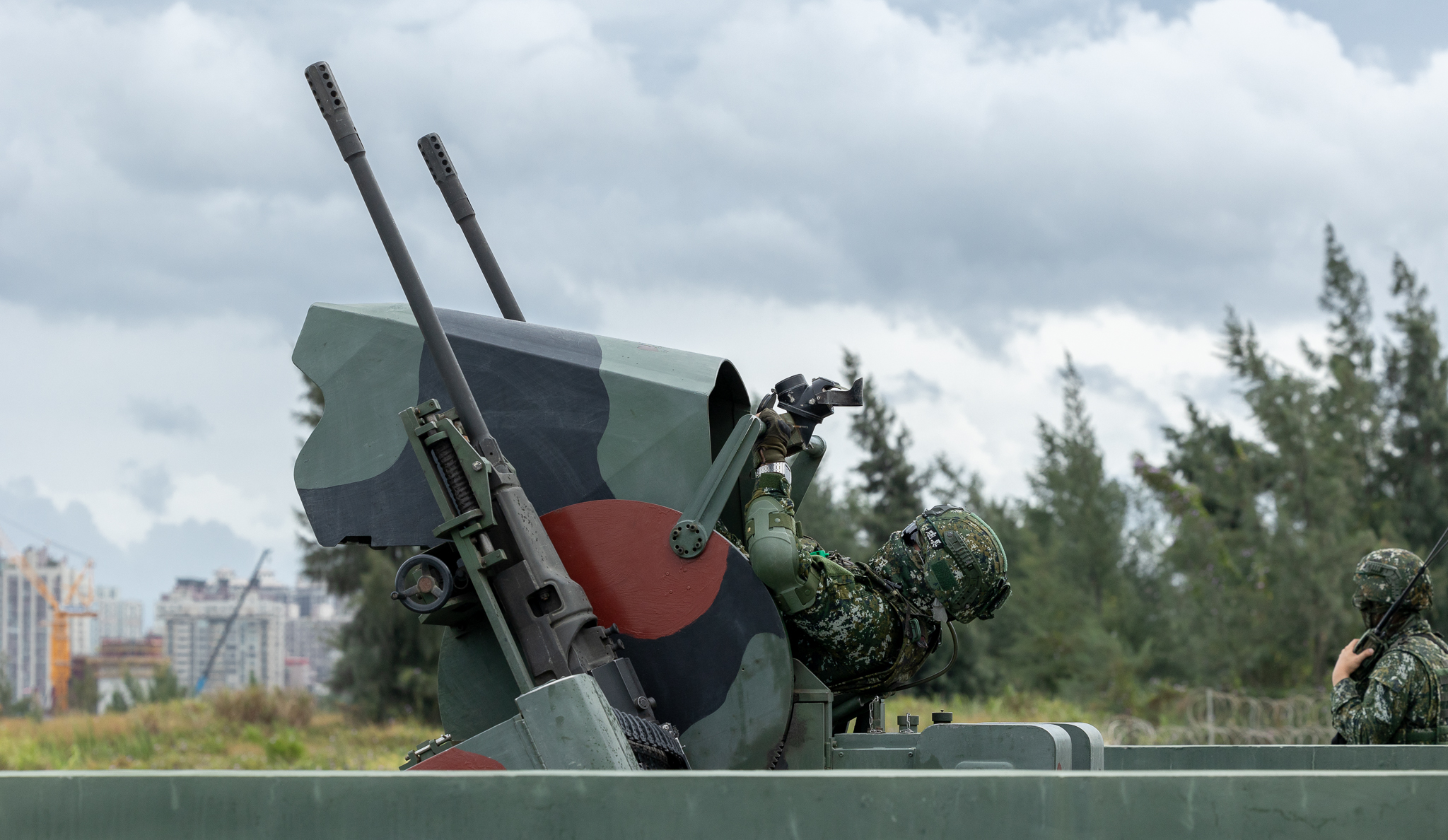
T-82T 20mm Twin Anti-Aircraft Cannon

== Anti-tank weapons ==
Platform	Type	Origin	In service	Notes
Hellfire AGM-114L	Anti-tank guided missile	United States	1,000	Carried by AH-64E since 2012-2014.
Hellfire AGM-114K3	Anti-tank guided missile	United States	240	Carried by AH-1W and OH-58D since 1999.
Hellfire AGM-114C	Anti-tank guided missile	United States	684	Carried by AH-1W and OH-58D.
BGM-71 TOW-2A/B	Anti-tank guided missile	United States	4,650+	163+ launchers, used by Republic of China Army and Republic of China Marine Corps on Humvee, M113, CM25, and on AH-1W and OH-58D helicopters. 769 BGM-71F TOW-2B ARF ordered in 2018. 1700 BGM-71F TOW-2B ARF ordered in 2019. 1545 BGM-71F TOW-2B ARF ordered in 2025.
FGM-148 Javelin	Anti-tank guided missile	United States	2200	40 launchers, 360 missiles ordered in 2002. 20 launchers, 182 missiles ordered in 2008. 60 launchers, 208 missiles ordered in 2017. 42 launchers, 400 missiles ordered in 2019; 70 launchers, 1050 missiles ordered in 2025.
APILAS	Anti-tank missile	France	1,000+	Over 1,000 delivered by 1998, deployed mostly in outlying islands.
M136 (AT4)	Shoulder launched recoilless gun	United States; Sweden	??	License-produced in the United States.
Carl Gustaf 8.4 cm recoilless rifle	Shoulder launched recoilless gun	United States; Sweden	??	The US received $567 million in military aid to Taiwan in 2024, the exact amount of which is unknown.
M72 LAW (Type 66)	Rocket-propelled grenade	United States	30,000+	Produced locally as the Type 66.
Kestrel	Rocket-propelled grenade	Taiwan	33,000+	

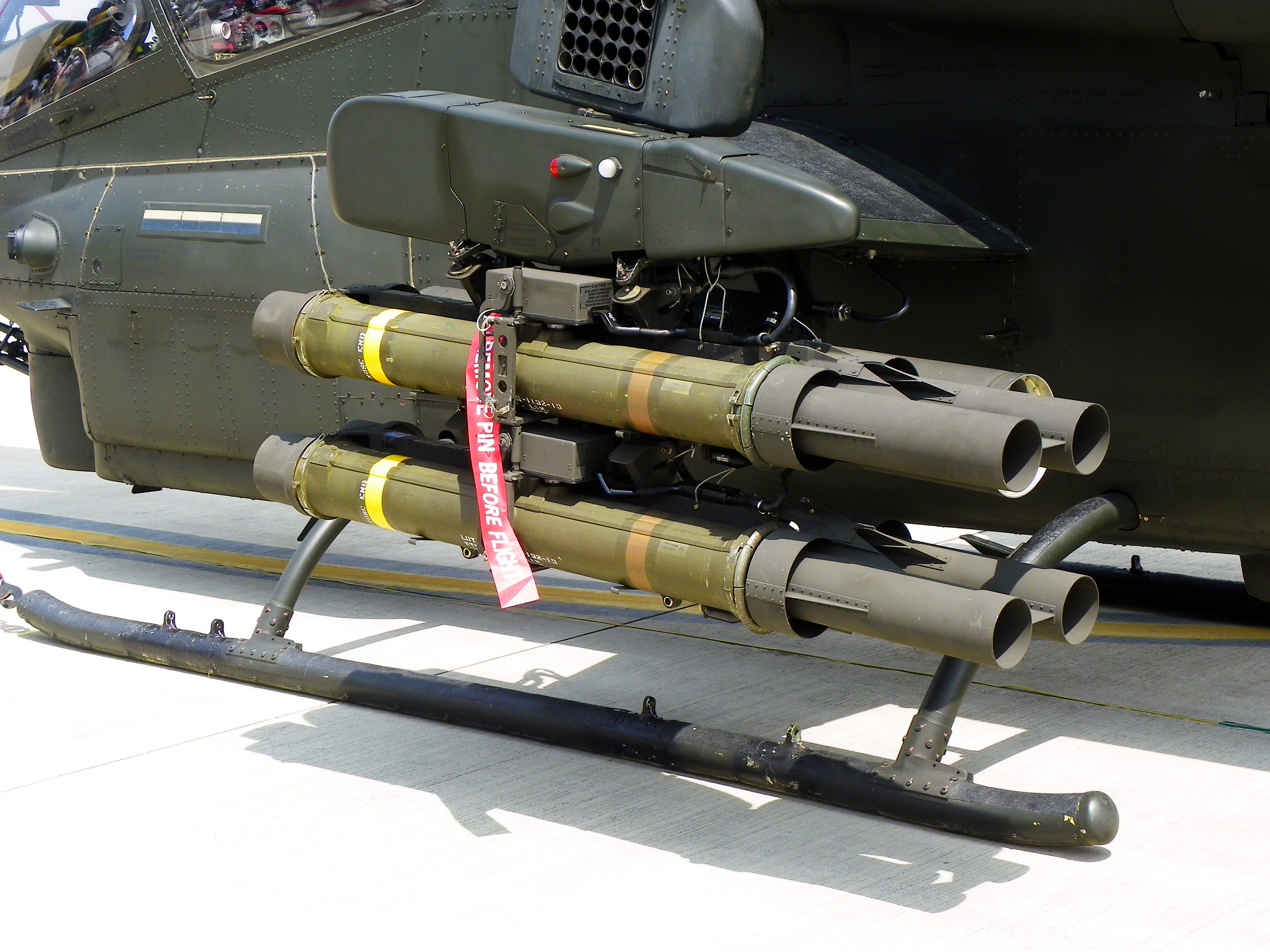
A 4-round XM65 Missile Launcher on outboard hardpoint of a ROCA AH-1W 20110813

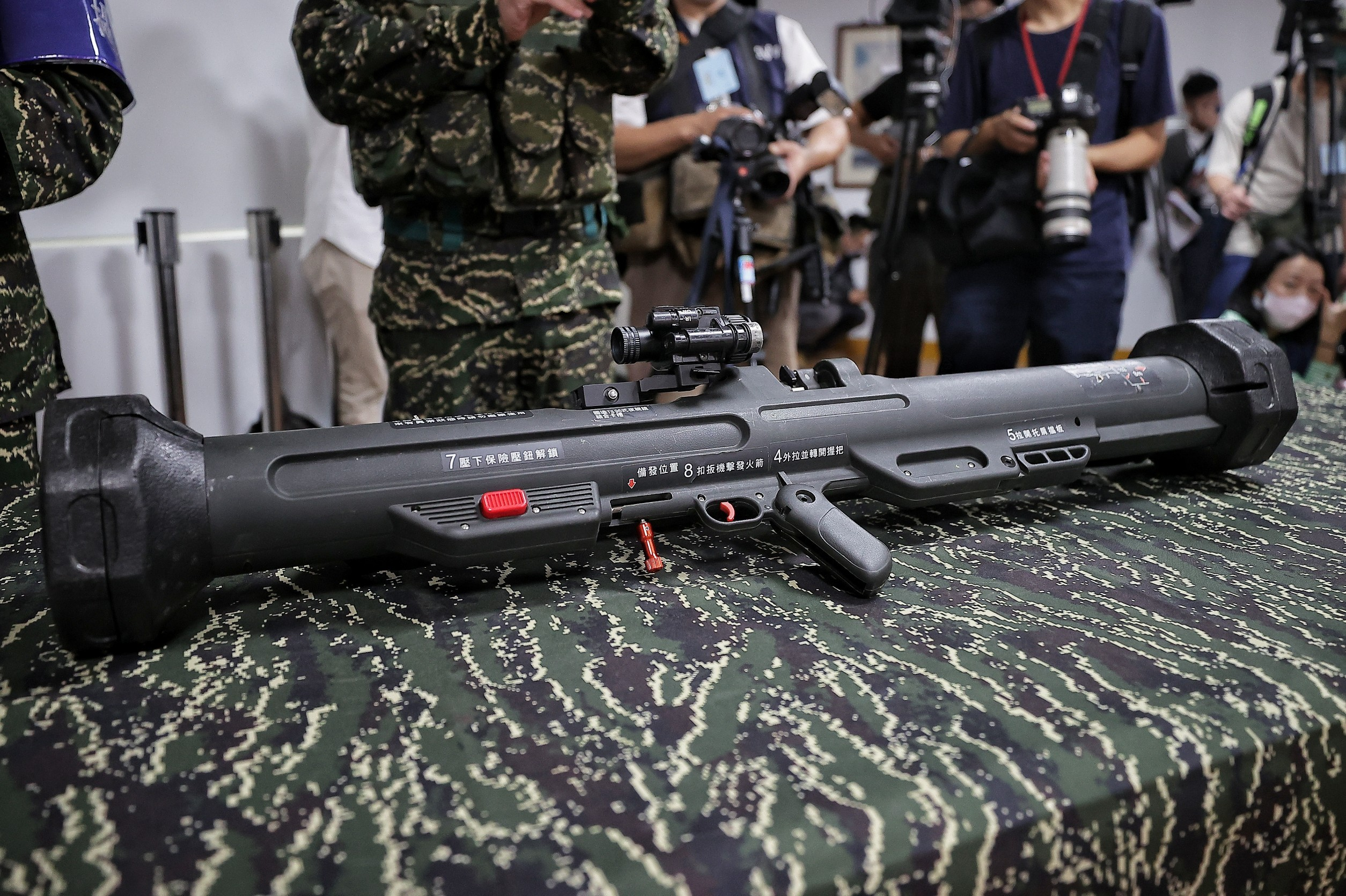
Kestrel anti-armor rocket

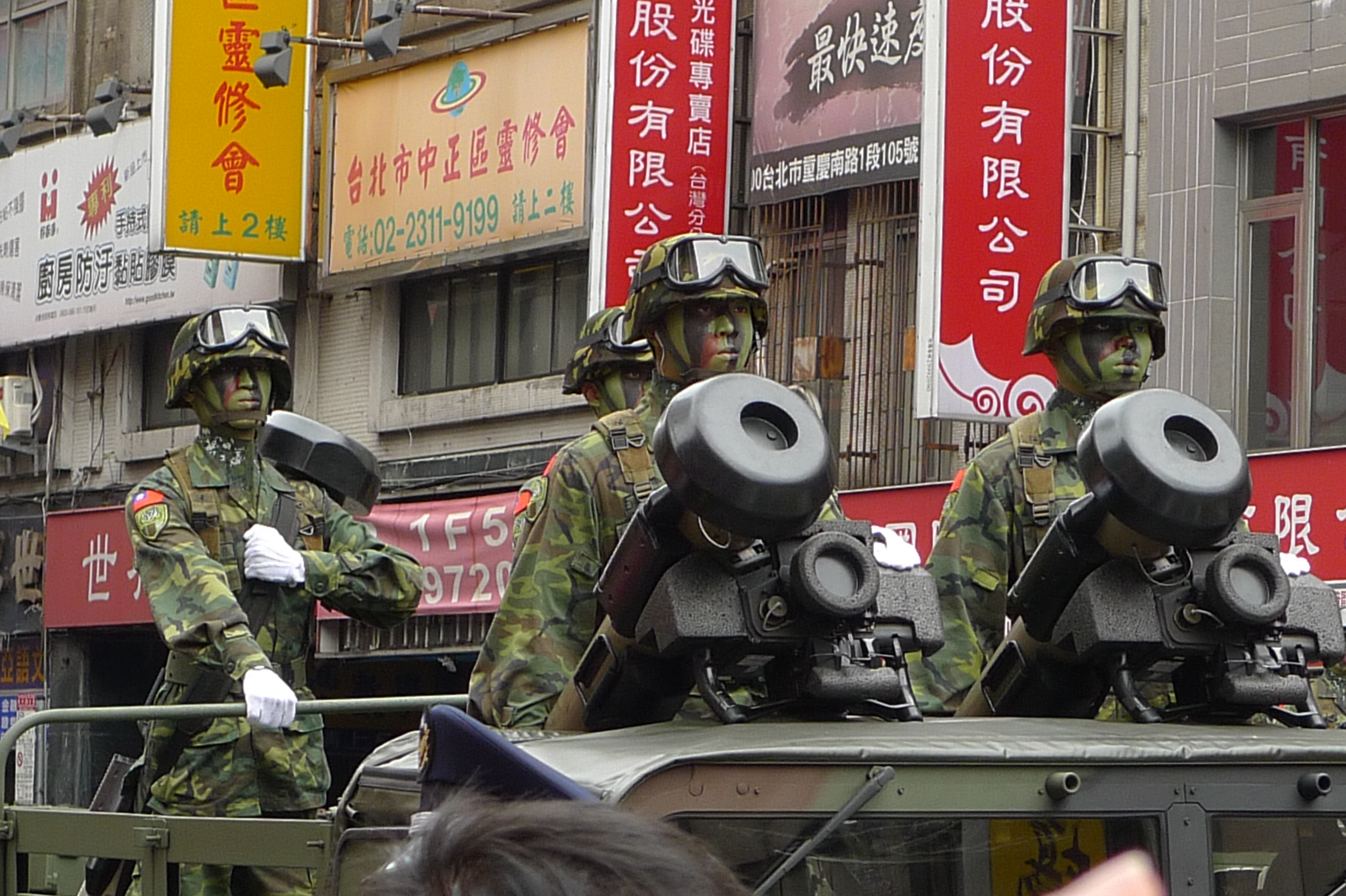
FGM-148 Javelin

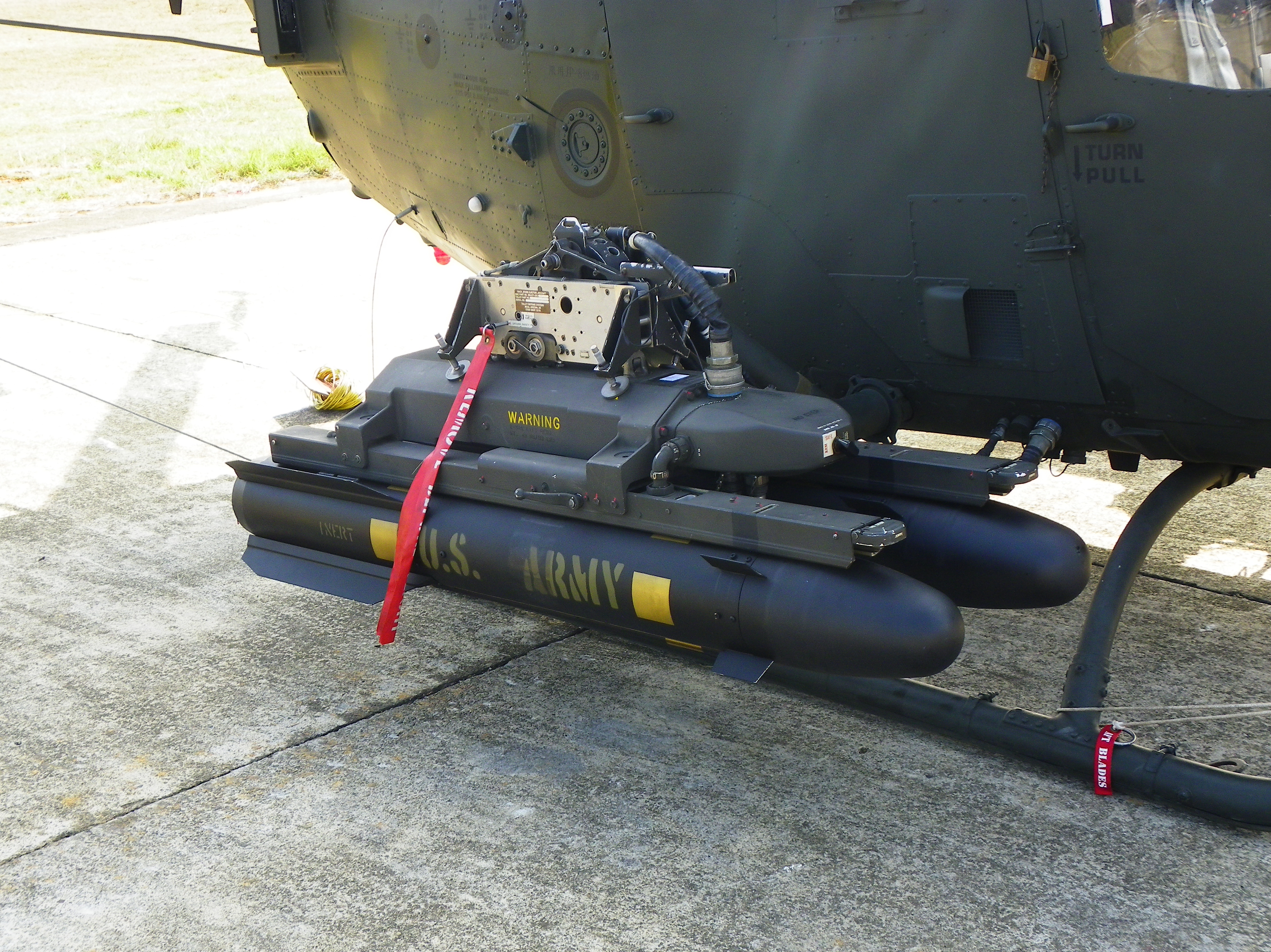
Two AGM-114 Hellfire Missiles Loaded on Mounting Bracket of ROCA OH-58D

== Retired ==
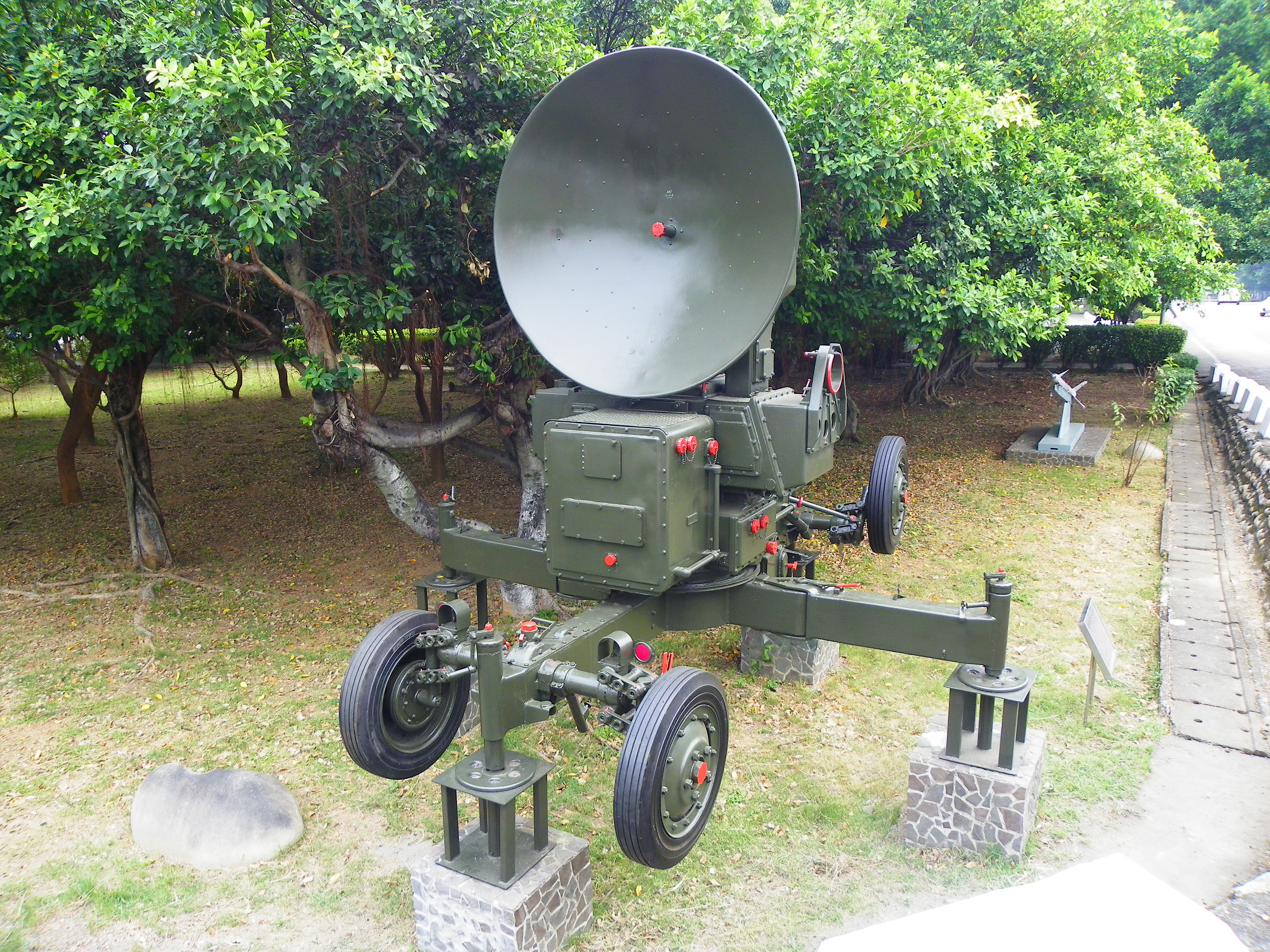
ROCA AN/MPQ-10 Radar

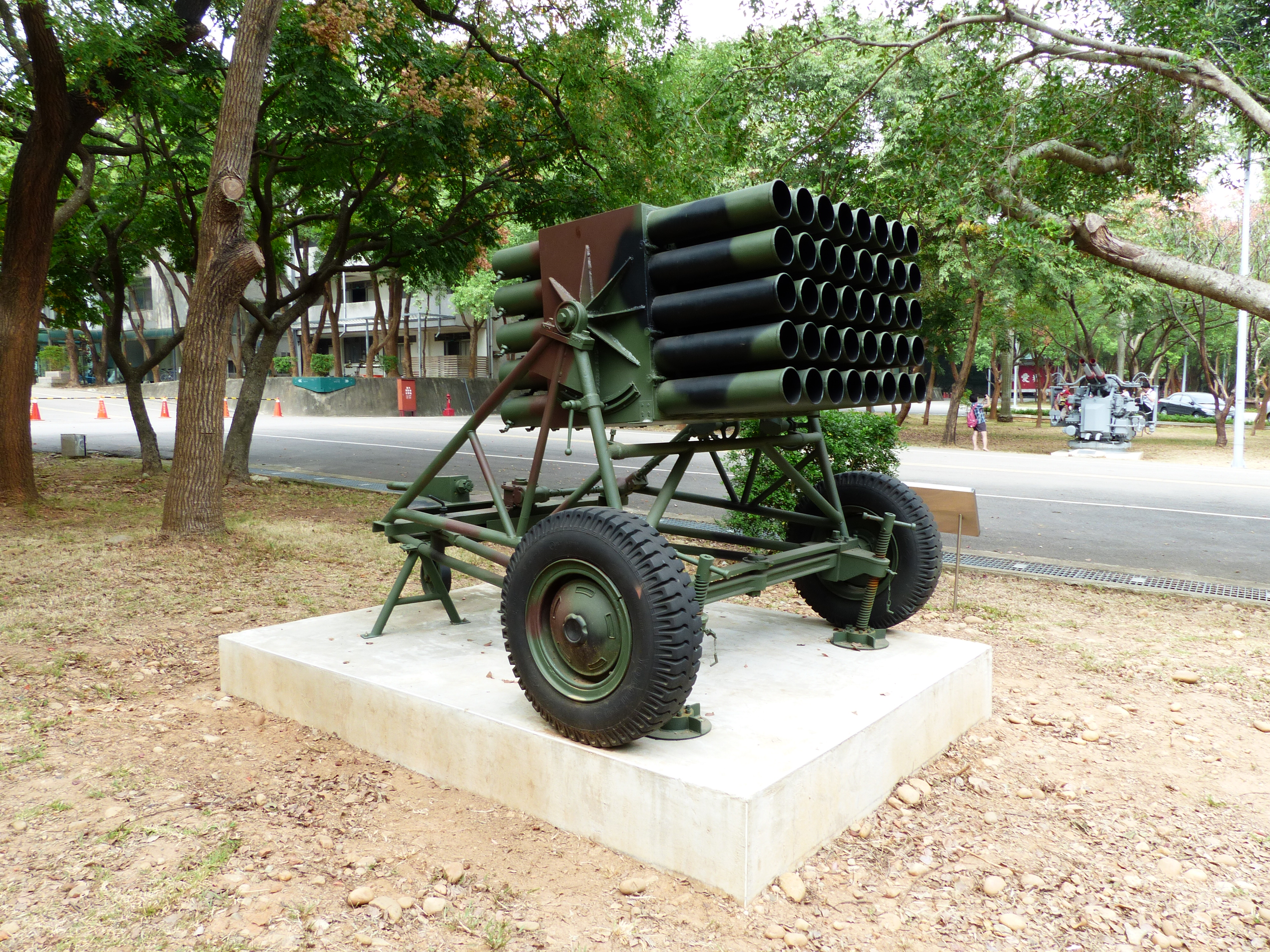
ROCA Kung Feng IV MLRS Trailer

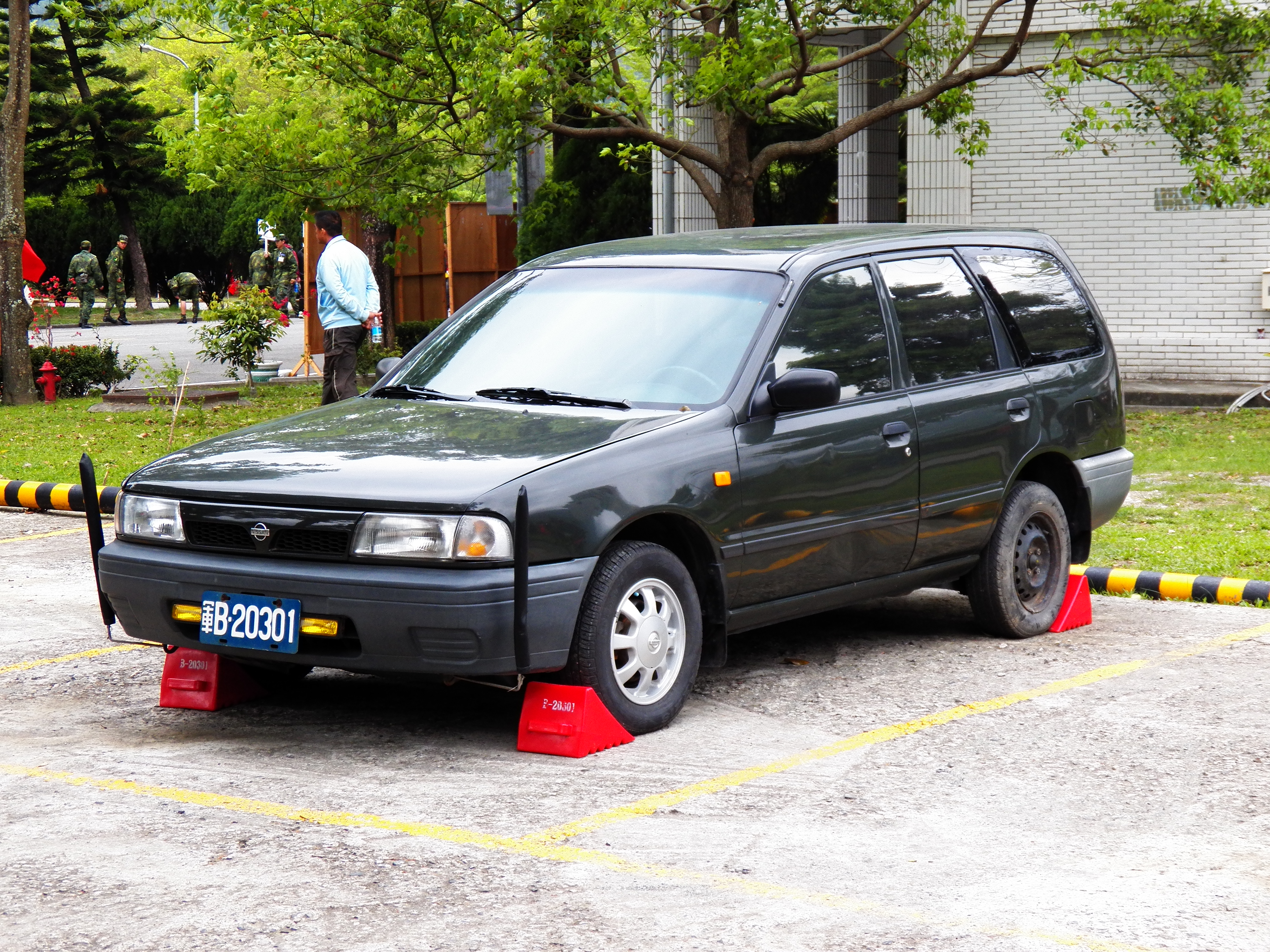
ROCA Nissan AD Resort 1.6 Wagon

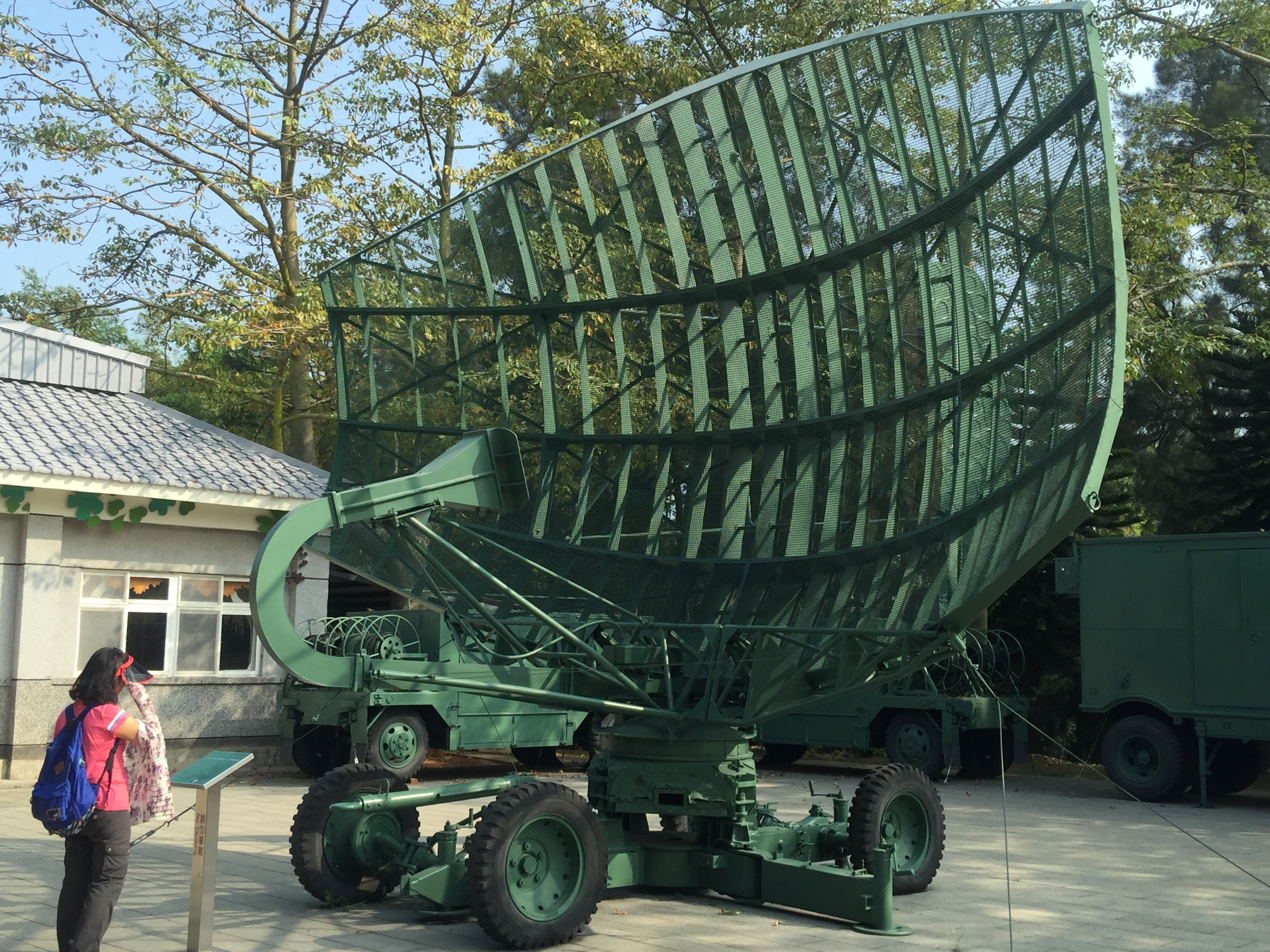
retired radar

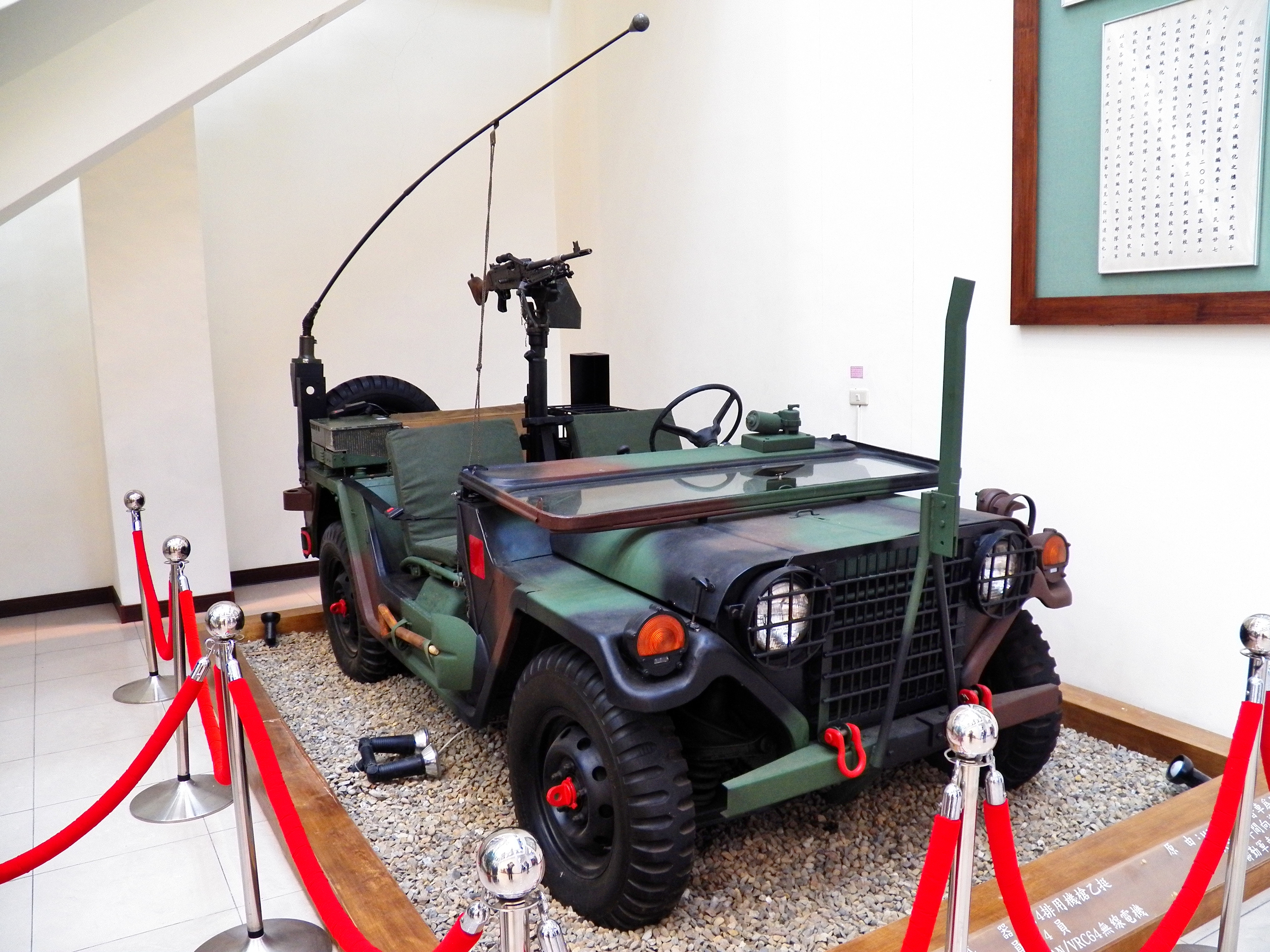
M151 Display at Armor School History Museum

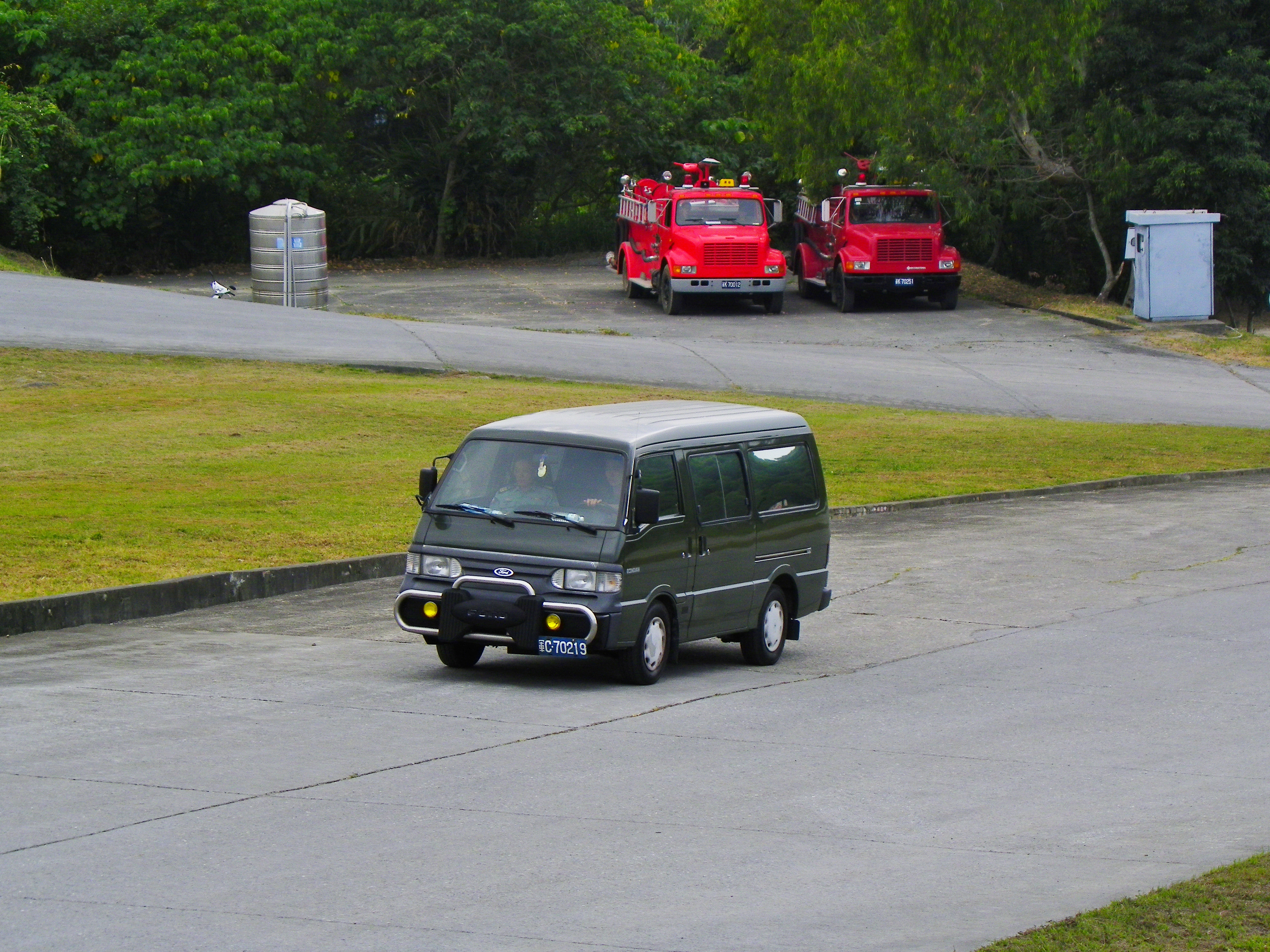
ROCA Ford Econovan

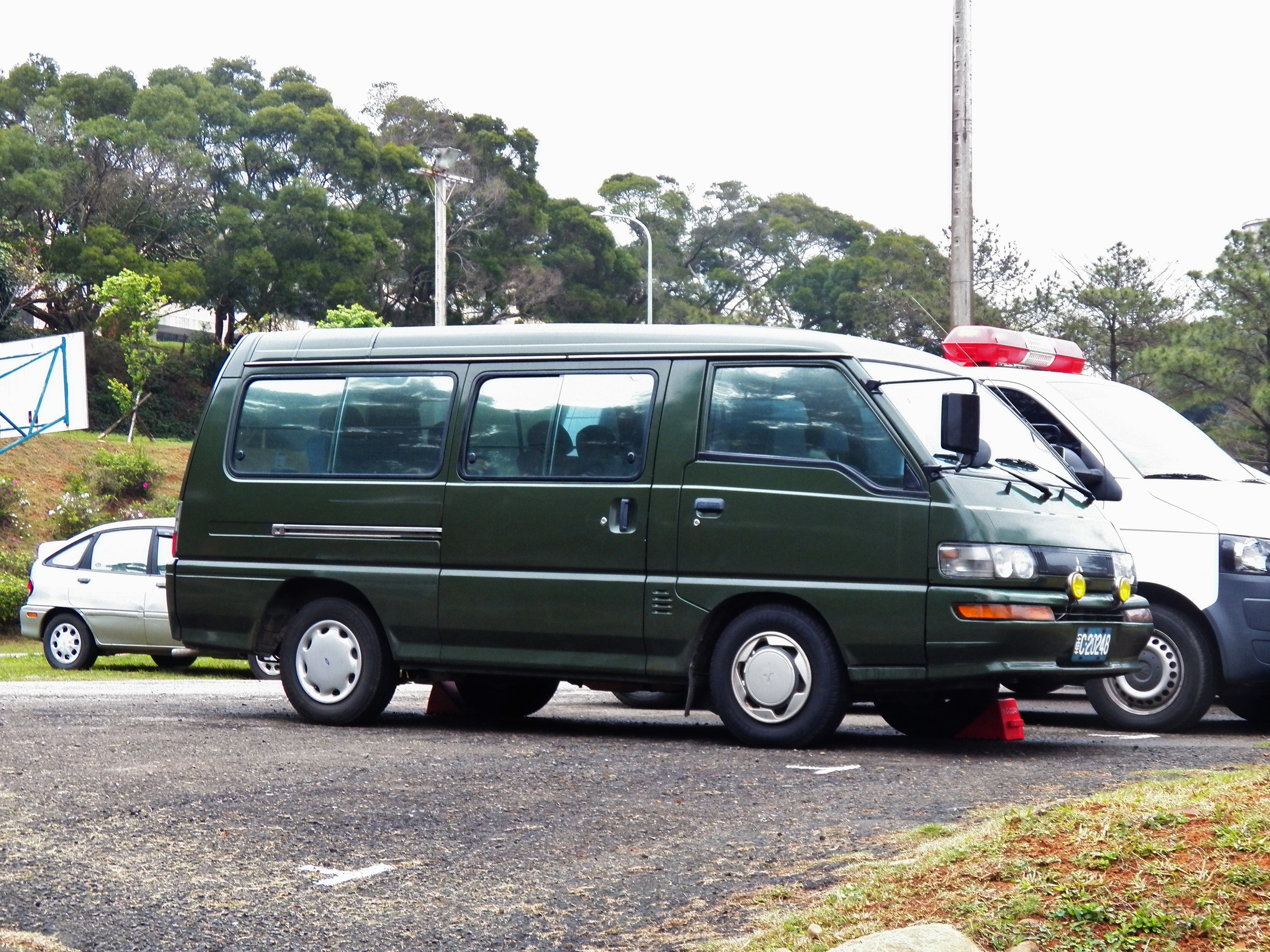
ROCA Mitsubishi Delica

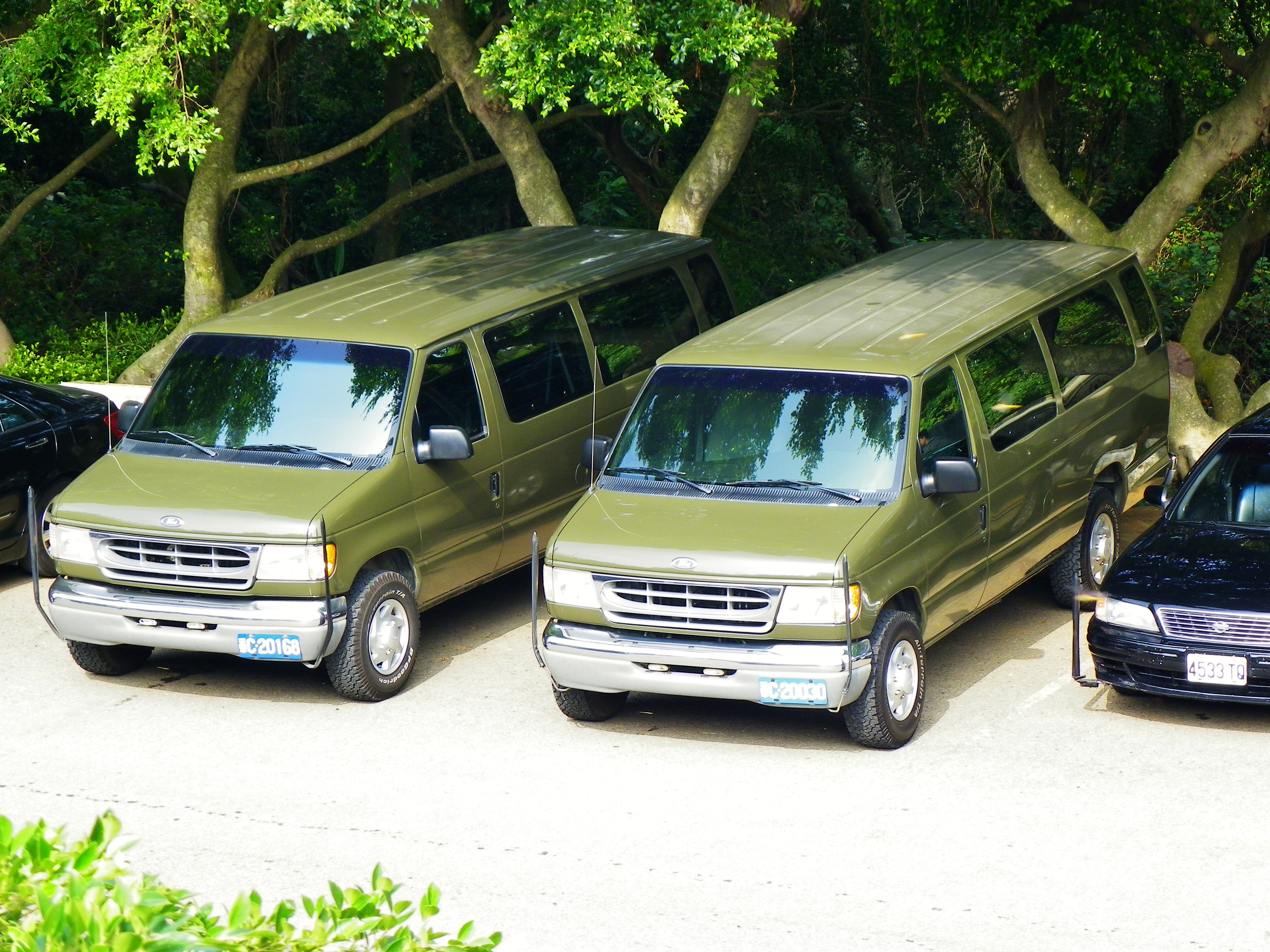
ROCA Ford Econoline

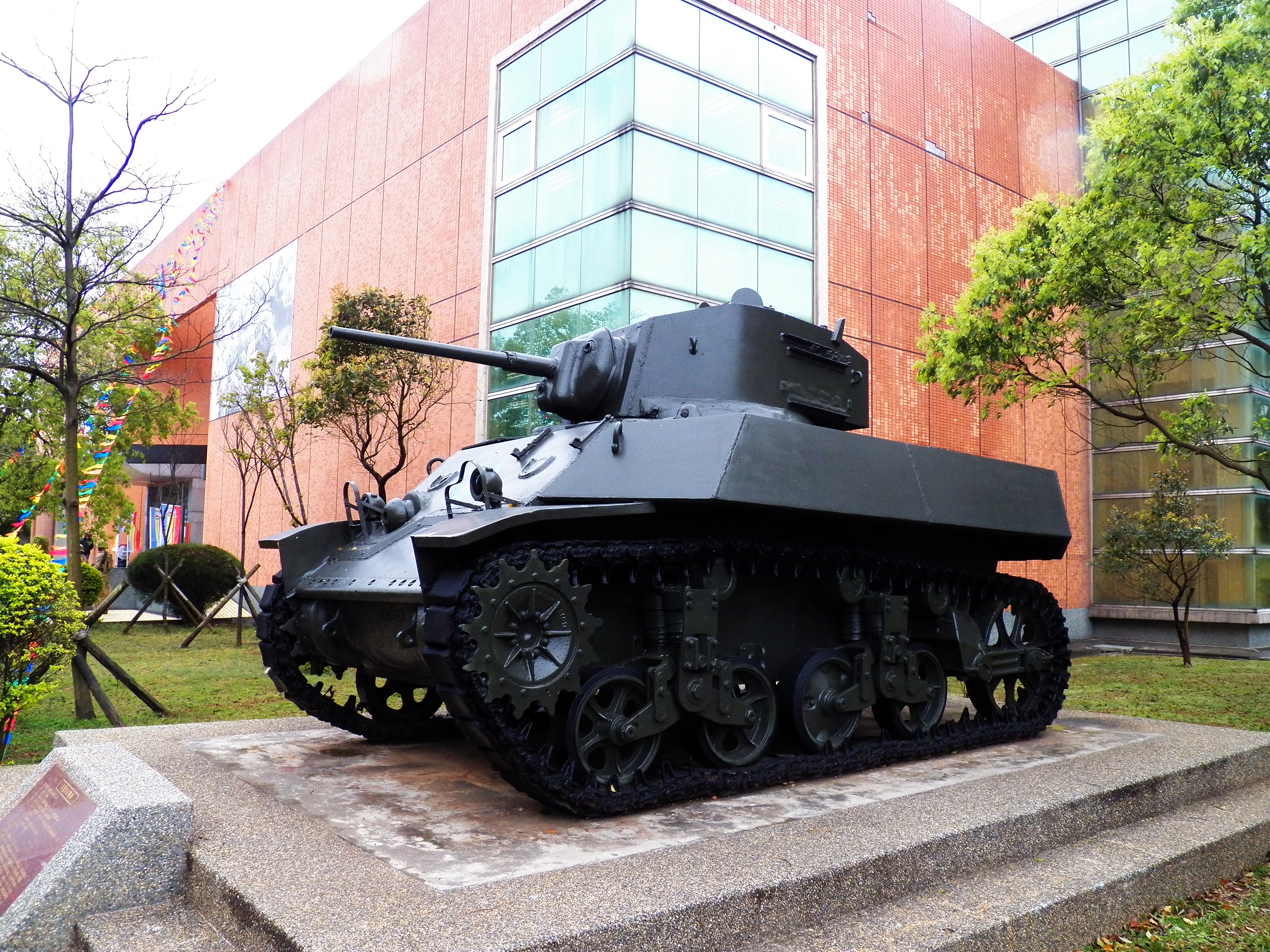
M3 Stuart tank

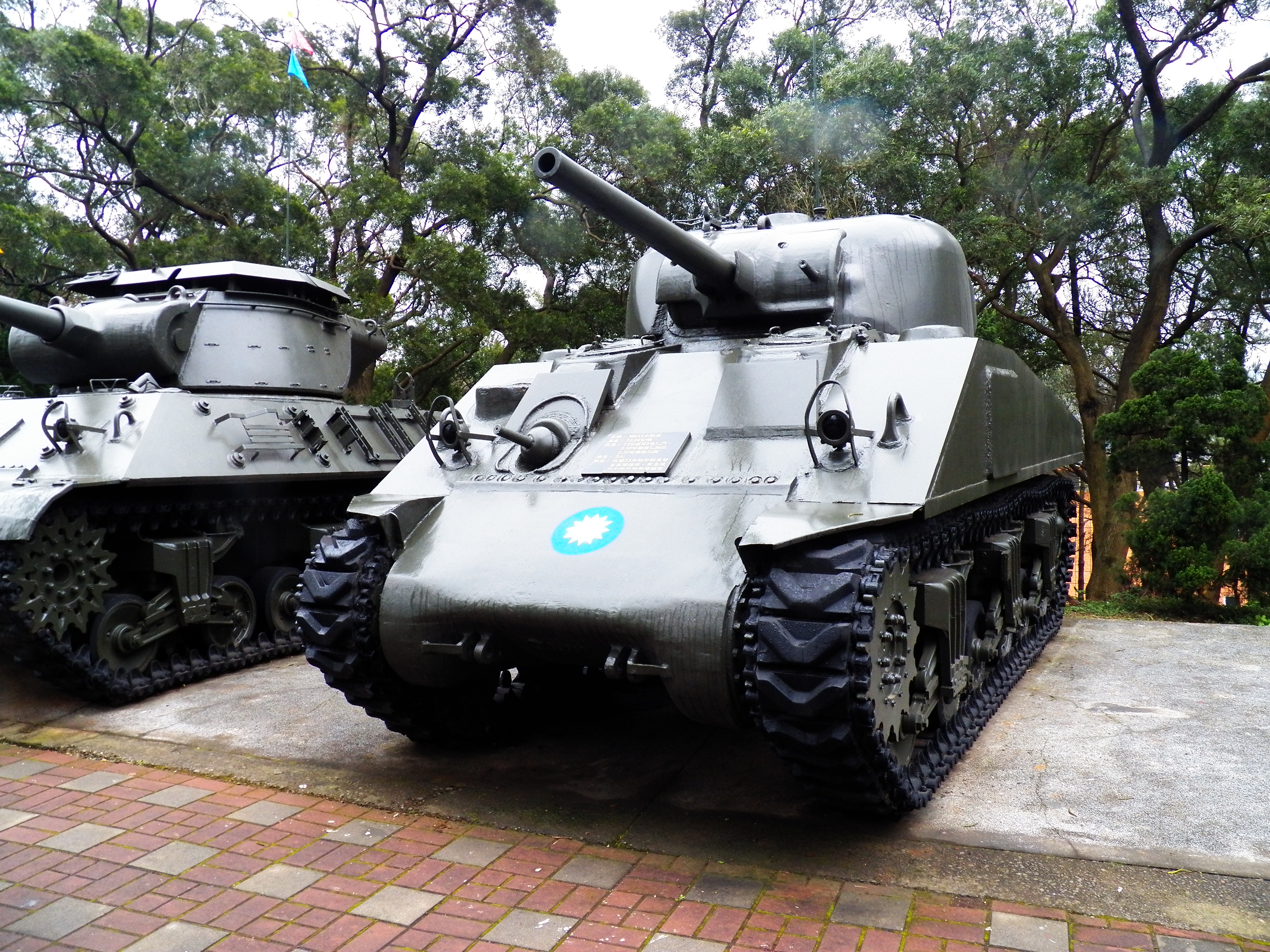
M4 Sherman tank

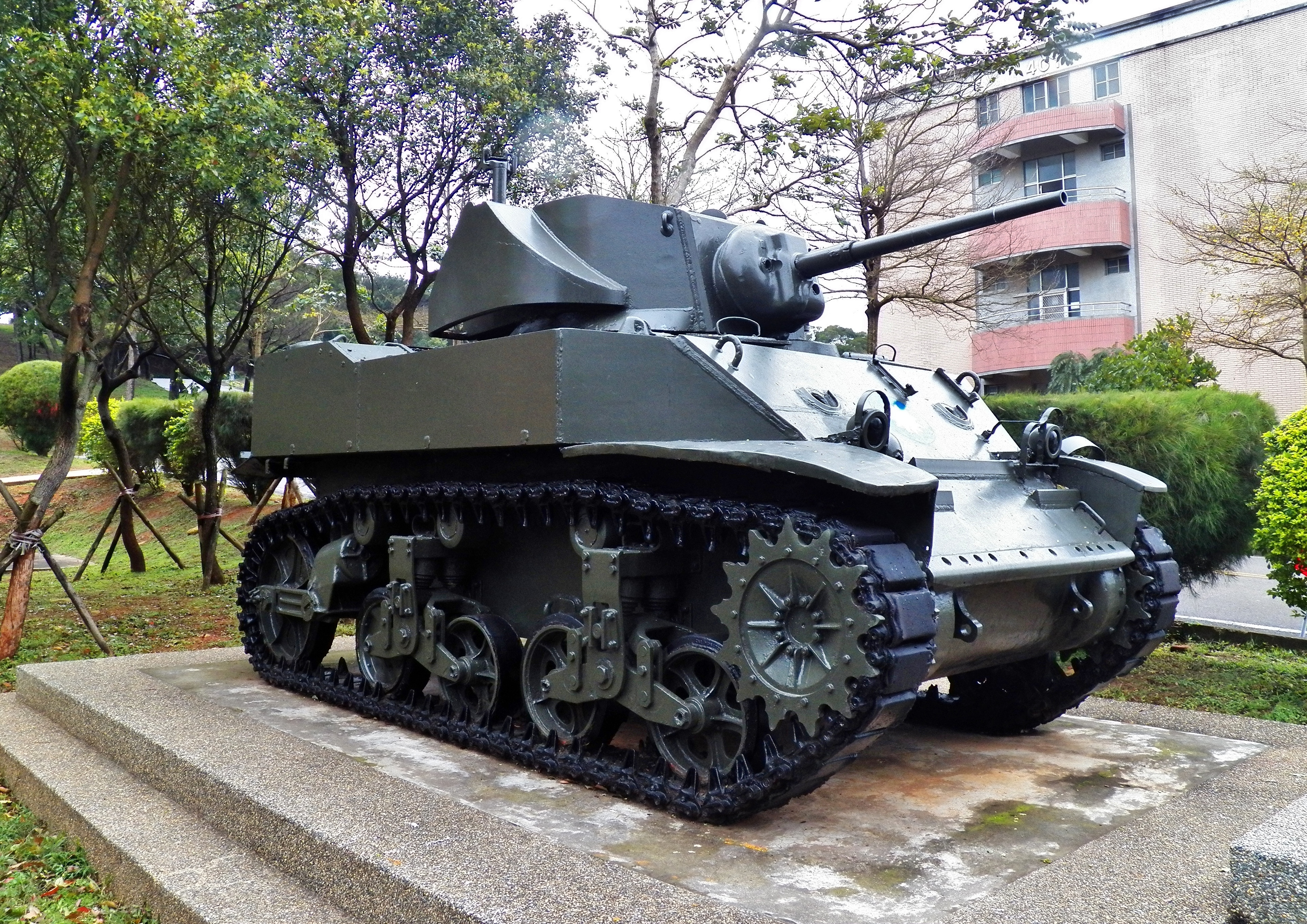
M5 Stuart tank

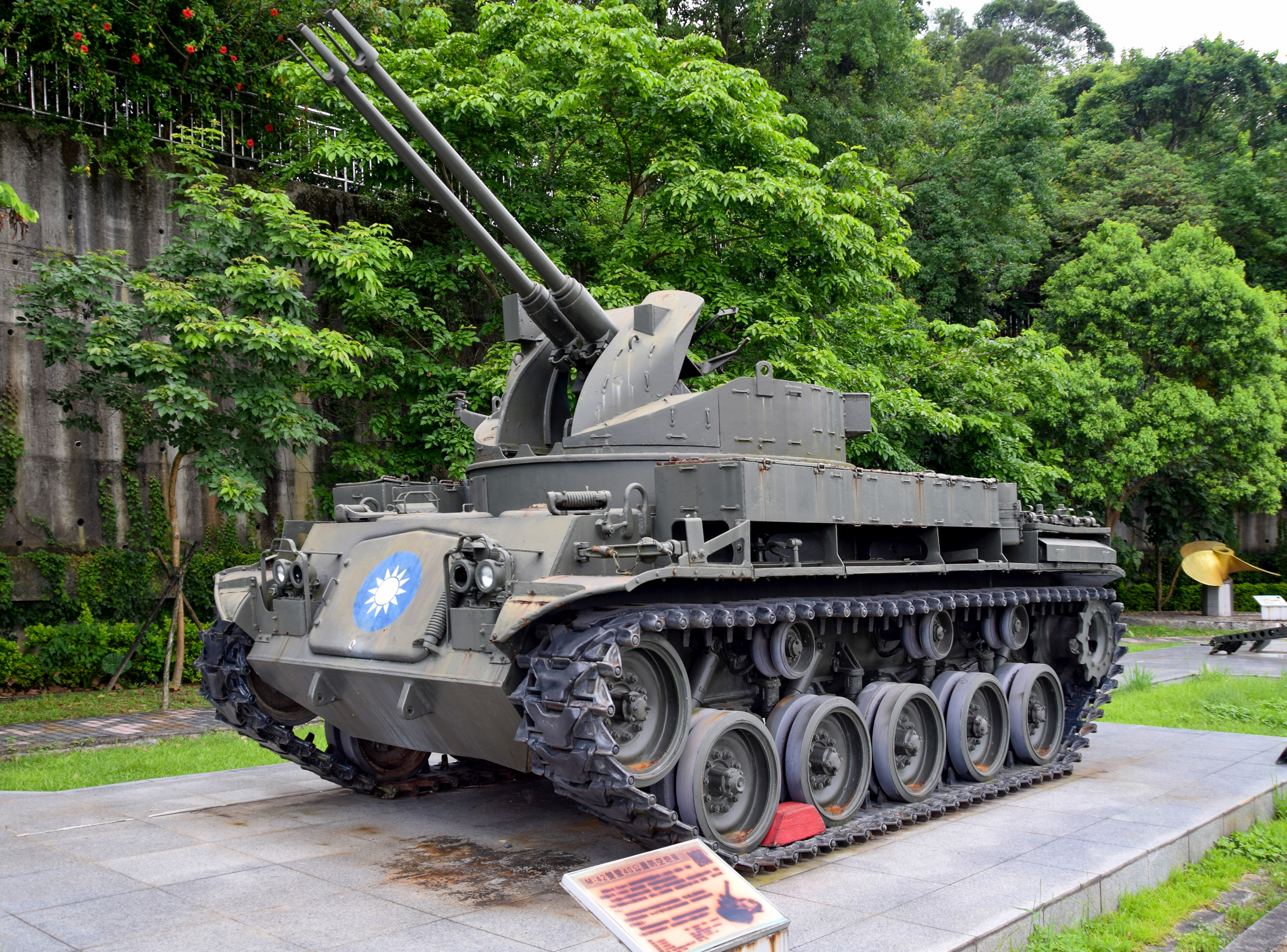
M42 Duster anti-aircraft gun

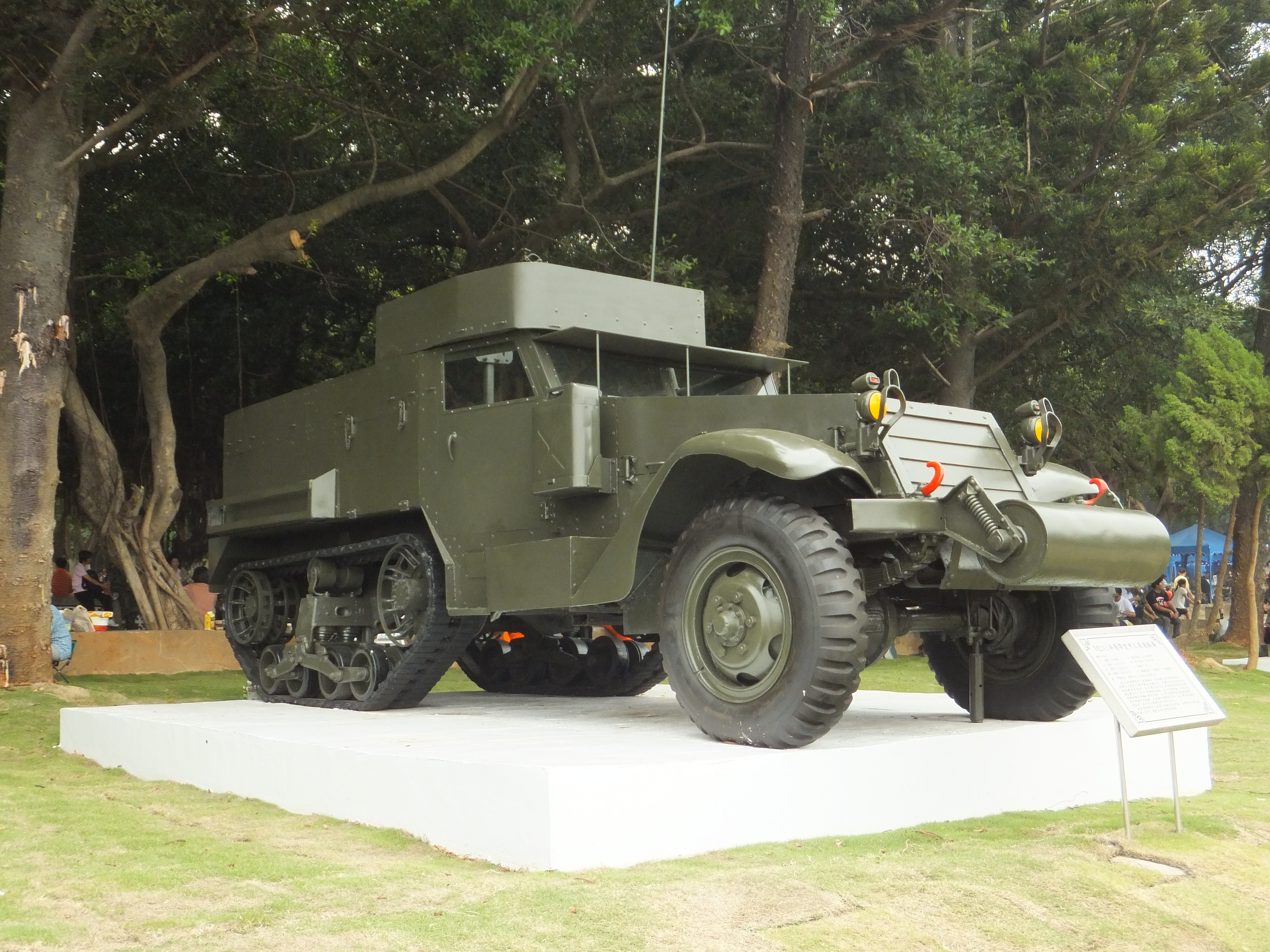
ROCA M2 half-track car

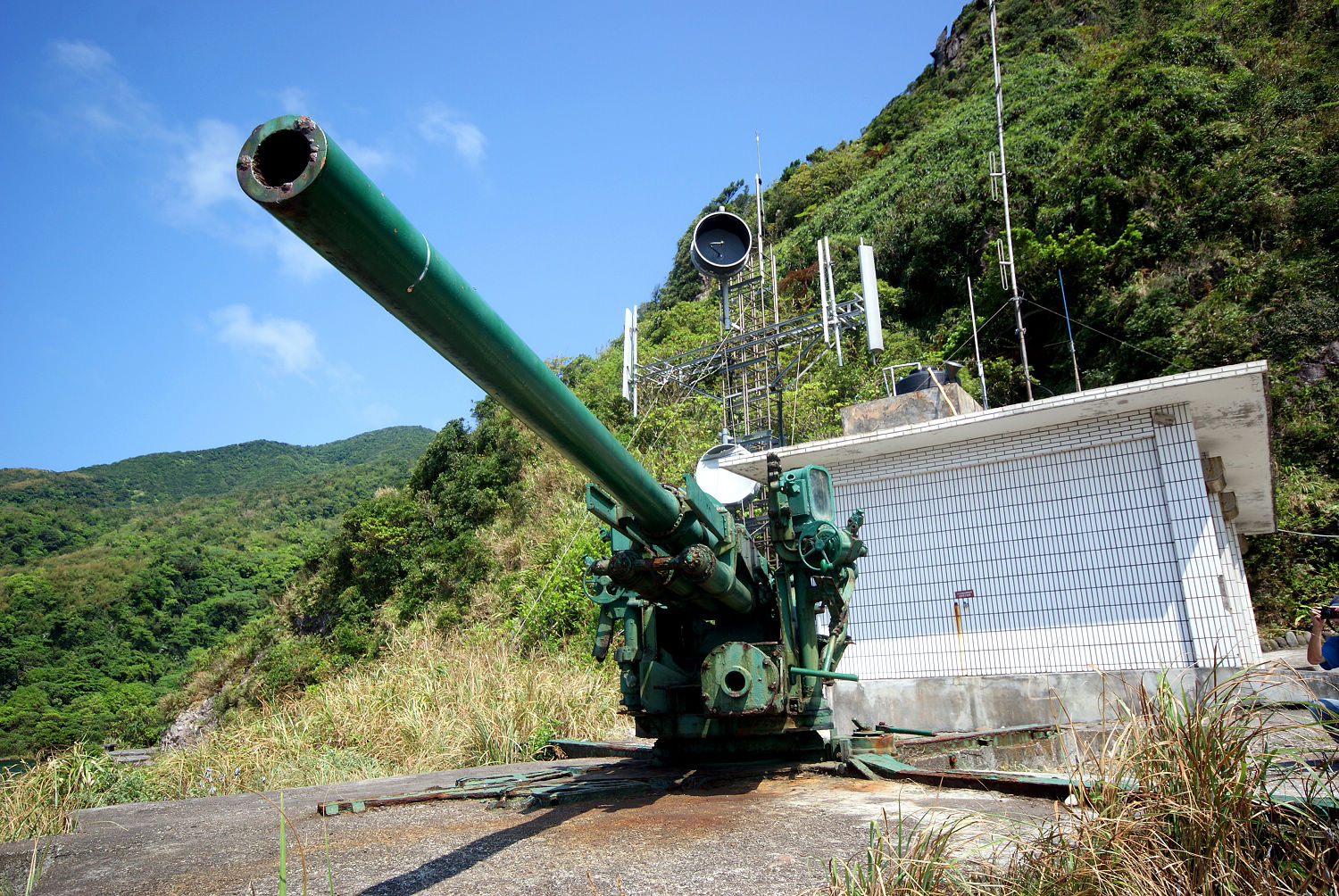
Retired fixed artillery piece

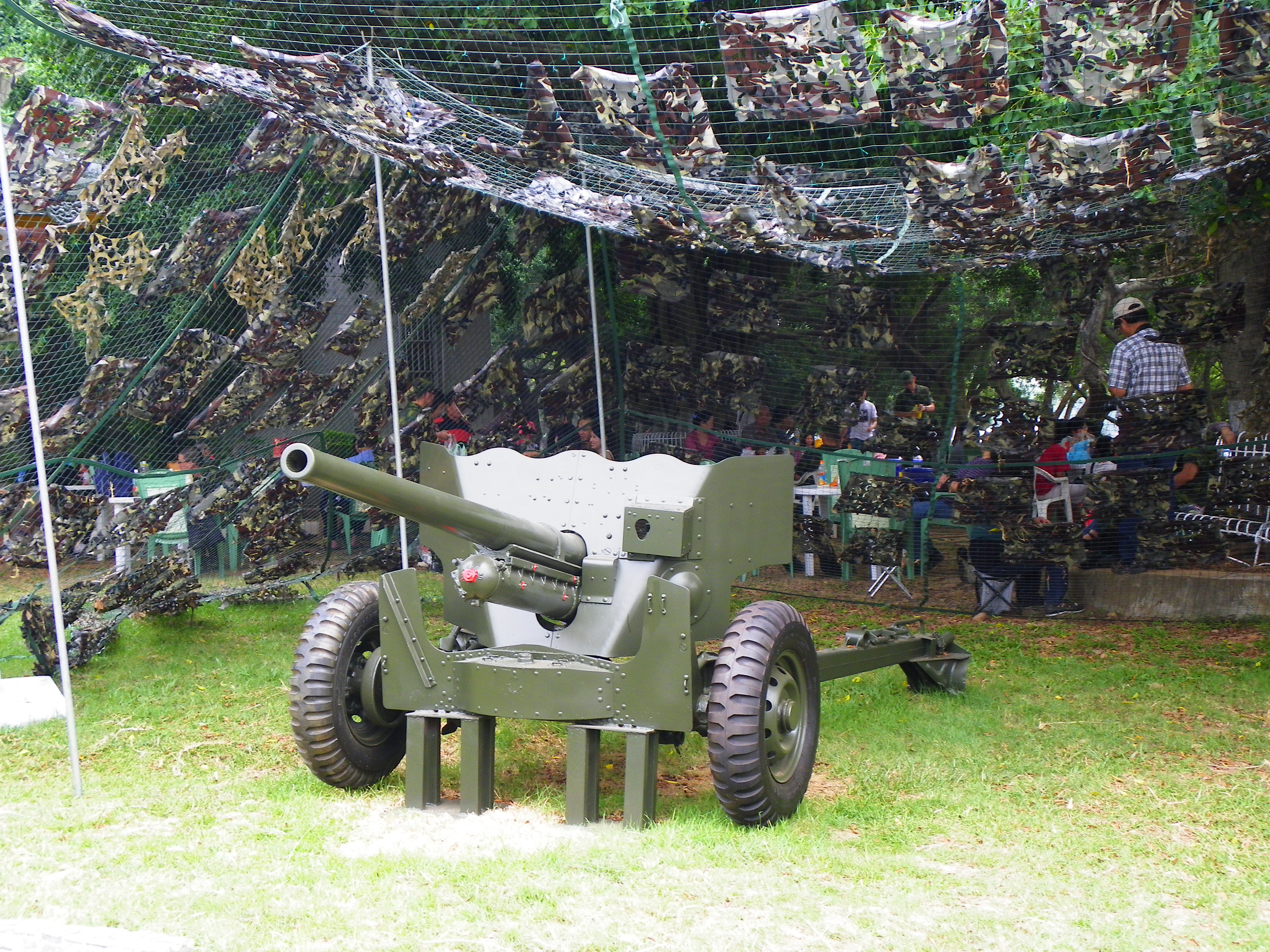
M1 57mm AT Gun

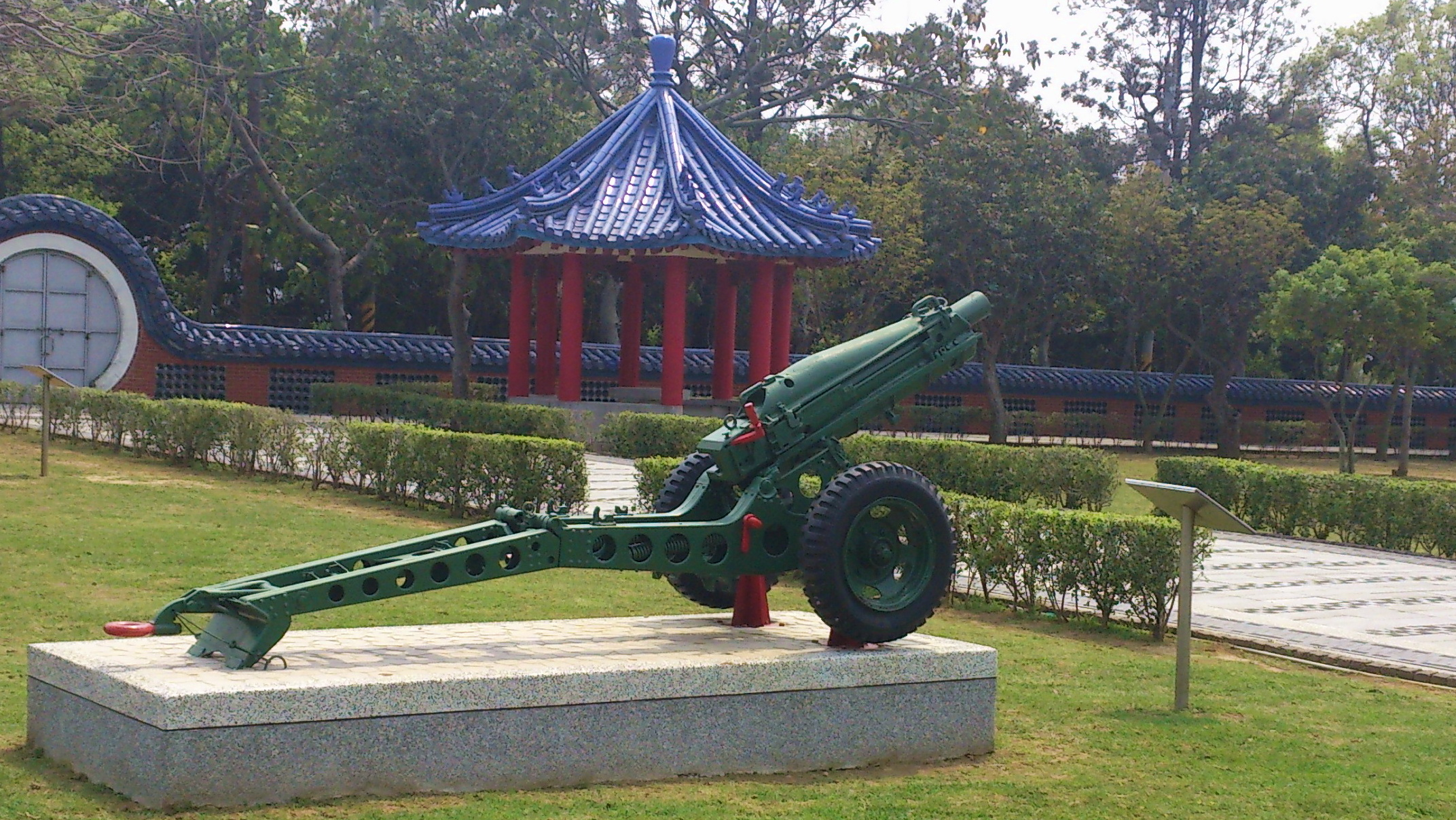
Retired howitzer

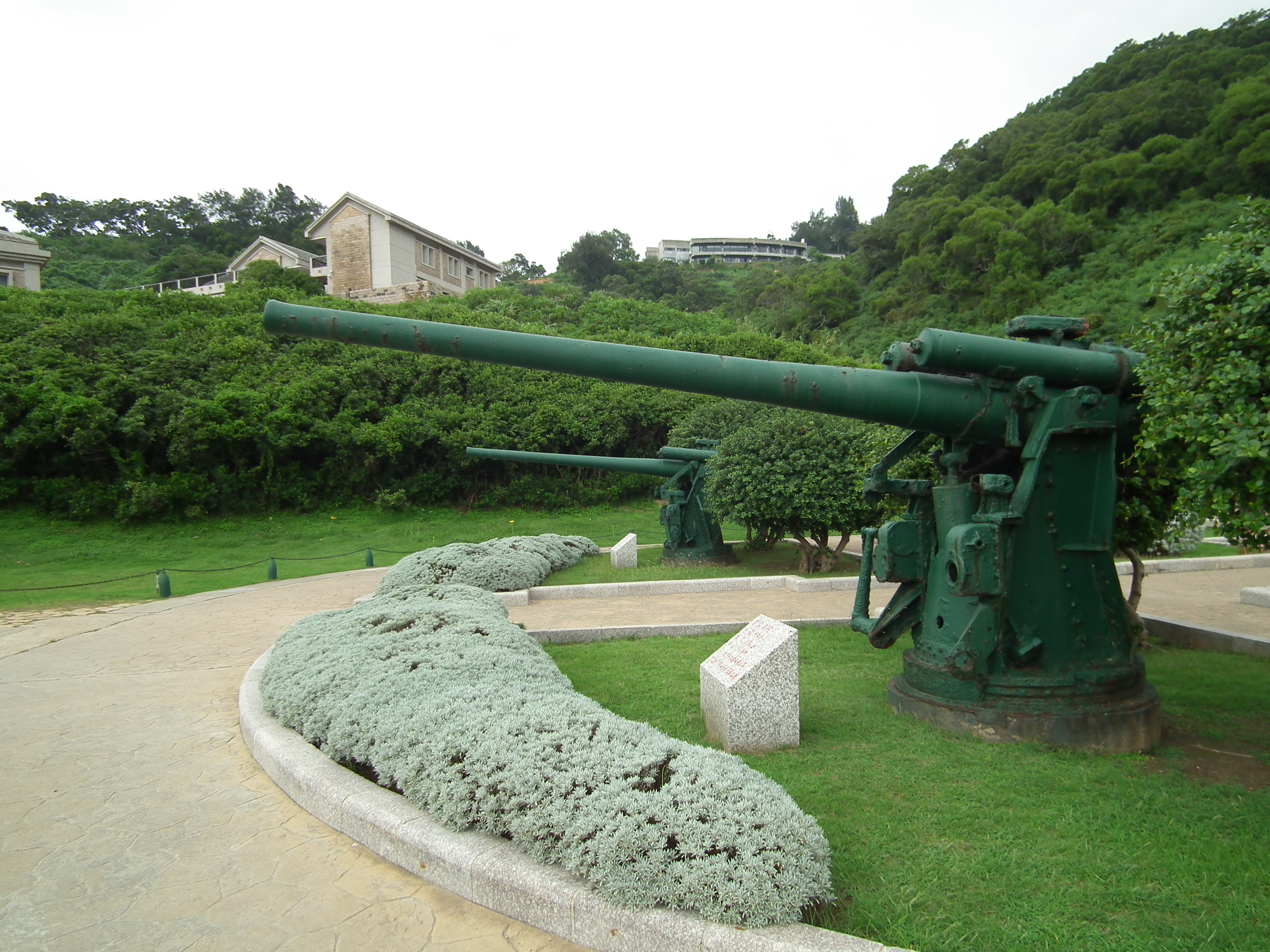
Retired Japanese anti-aircraft gun

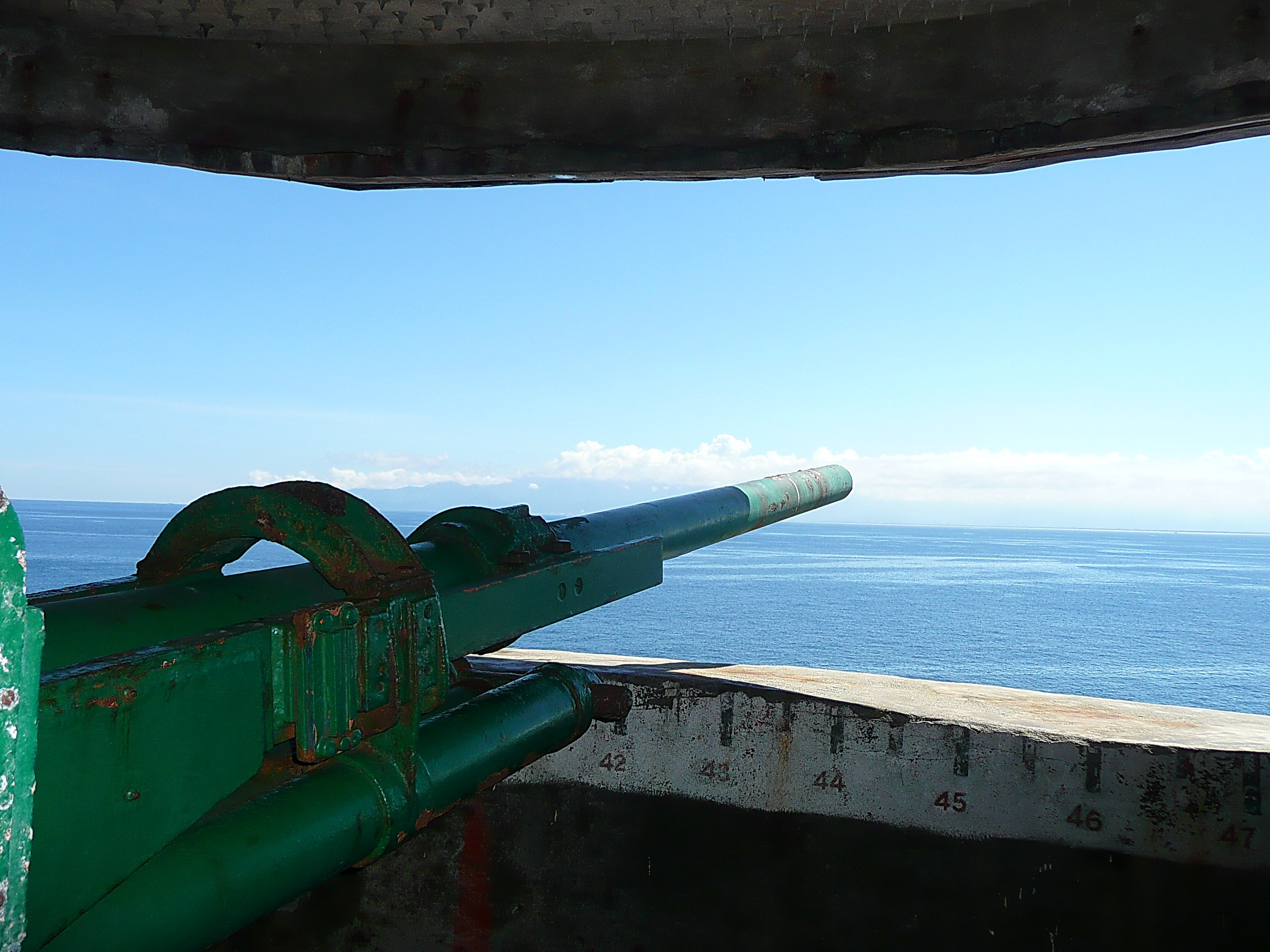
Retired fixed artillery piece

== See also ==
- Defense industry of Taiwan
- List of equipment of the Republic of China Air Force
- List of equipment of the Republic of China Navy
