= National Police Agency (Taiwan) =

Law enforcement agency of Taiwan

National Police Agency 警政署 Jǐngzhèng Shǔ (Pinyin) Kín-chṳn-su (Pha̍k-fa-sṳ) Kéng-chèng-sú (Pe̍h-ōe-jī)
- Abbreviation: NPA

Agency overview
- Formed: 5 July 1972
- Preceding agency: National Police Headquarters
- Employees: 73,900

Jurisdictional structure
- National agency (Operations jurisdiction): Republic of China (Taiwan)
- Operations jurisdiction: Republic of China (Taiwan)
- Legal jurisdiction: Taiwan Area

Operational structure
- Headquarters: Zhongzheng District, Taipei
- Agency executives: Chang Jung-Hsin, Director-General; Chen Yong-Li Chan Yung-Mao Liao Mei-Ling, Deputy Director-Generals
- Parent agency: Ministry of the Interior

Website
- Official website

The National Police Agency, (NPA; Chinese: 內政部警政署; pinyin: Nèizhèngbù Jǐngzhèngshǔ; Pe̍h-ōe-jī: Luē-chèng-pō͘ Kéng-chèng-sú) is a statutory body under the Ministry of the Interior of the Republic of China (ROC), commonly known as Taiwan. Headquartered in Taipei, the agency oversees all police forces nationwide.

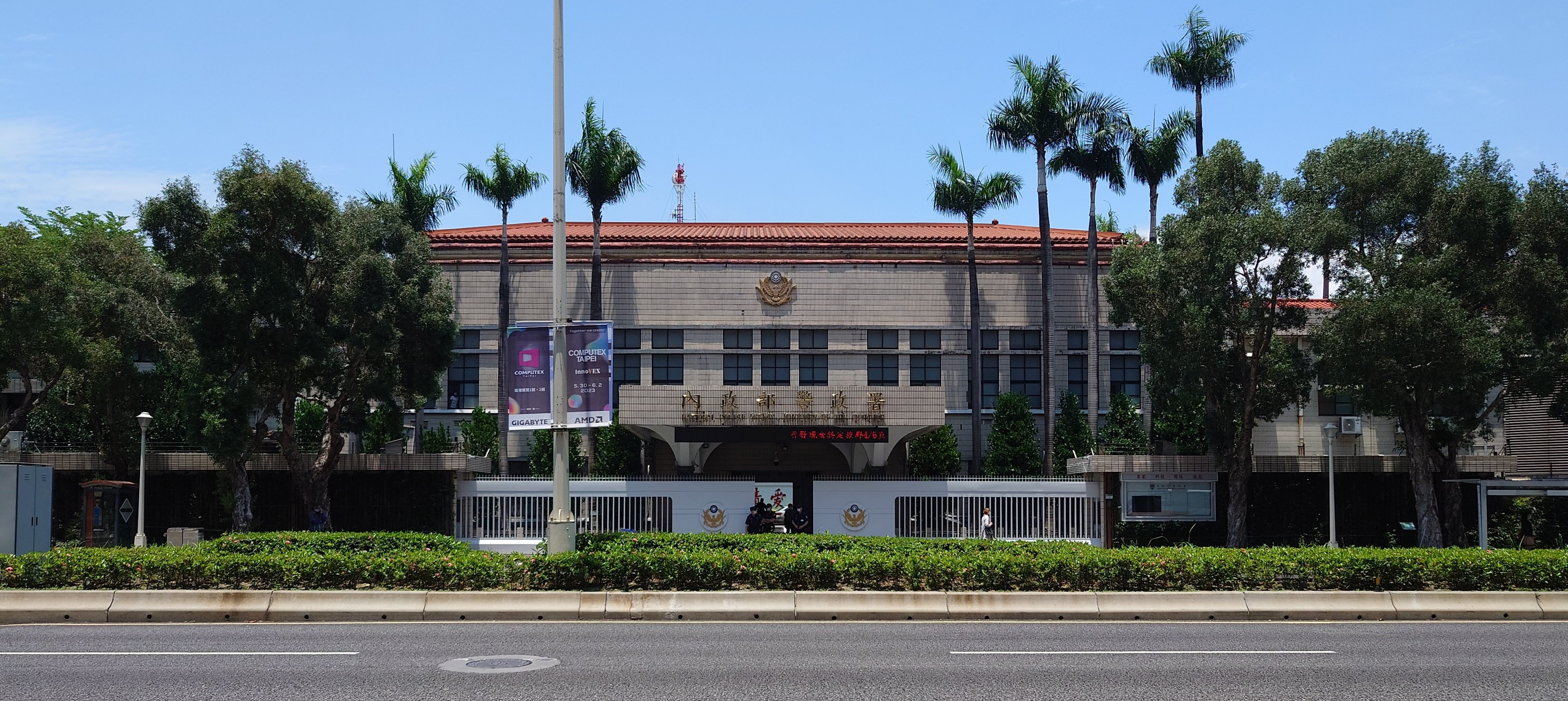
National Police Agency headquarters

== Police organization and structure ==
=== Hierarchy ===
Most law enforcement and day-to-day policing duties on a city and county-level are delegated to local police departments, which answer to the NPA but are considered agencies of their local government. However, the NPA has direct control over several specialized units which may be deployed to assist local forces, as well as the national highway patrol.

Unlike law enforcement in the United States, the central government appoints the head positions of city and county police departments in the ROC and maintains a chain of command for all police personnel. The Director-General of the NPA exercises full authority over personnel rotations and transfers, as well as administrative commendations and reprimands over all high-ranking police officers, including local police department chiefs.

One exception is the President of the Central Police University, who is directly subordinate to the Minister of the Interior and is not subject to the NPA personnel review board.

=== NPA Units ===
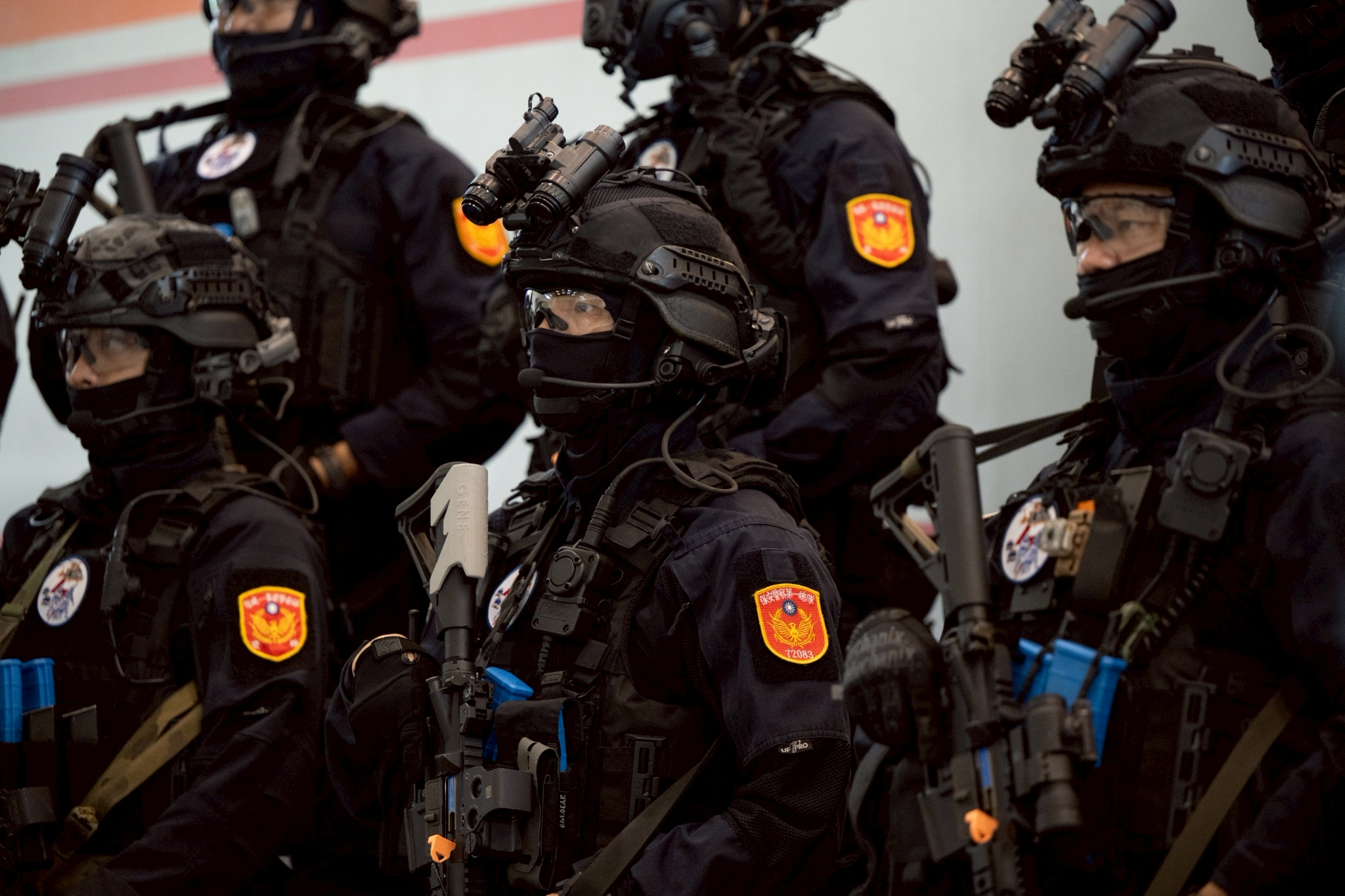
National Police Agency Special Operations Group (NPASOG)

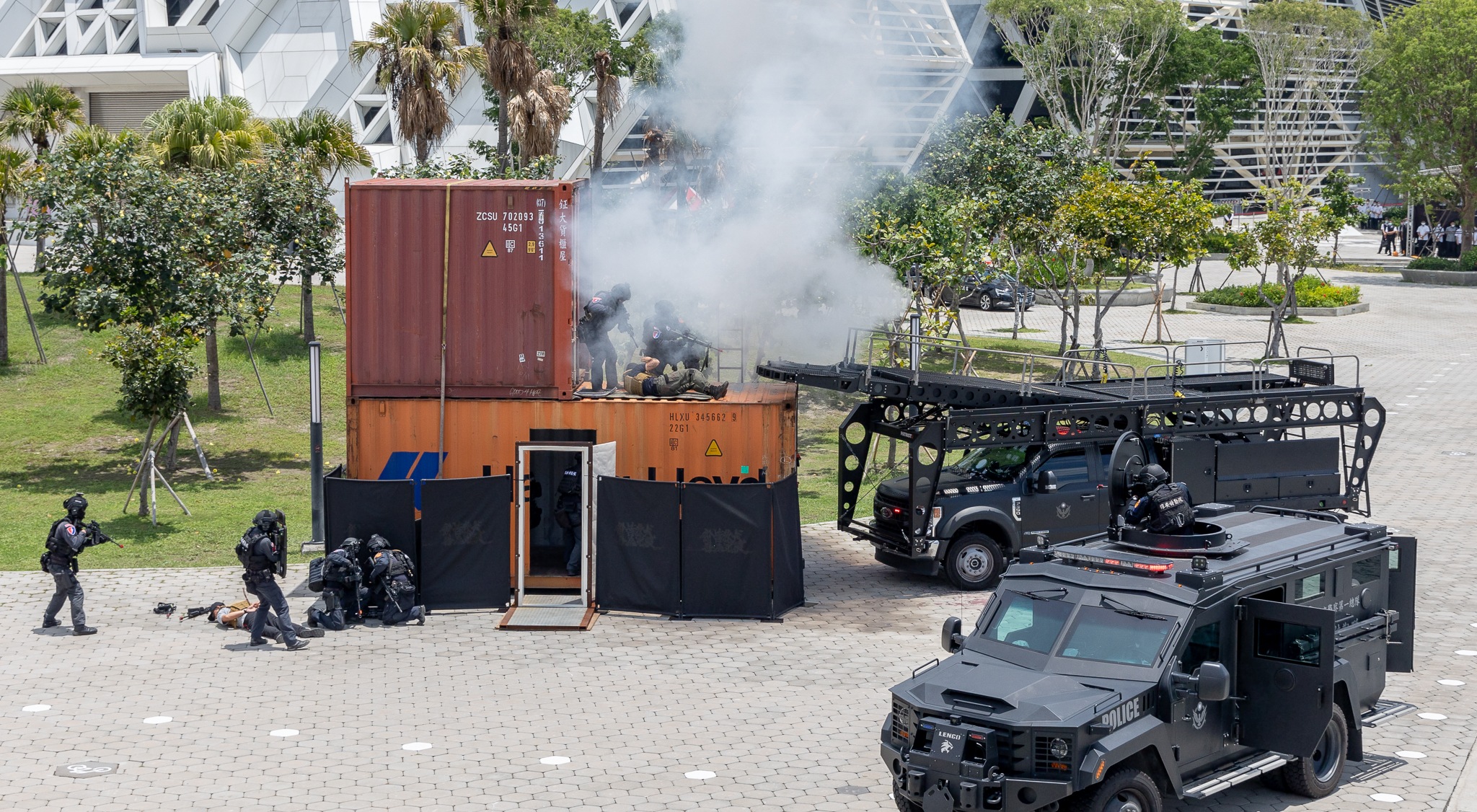
National Police Agency Special Operations Group Conducting counter-terrorist exercise

In addition to its own internal administrative offices, the NPA has direct control over the following units and agencies:

==== Criminal Investigation Bureau ====
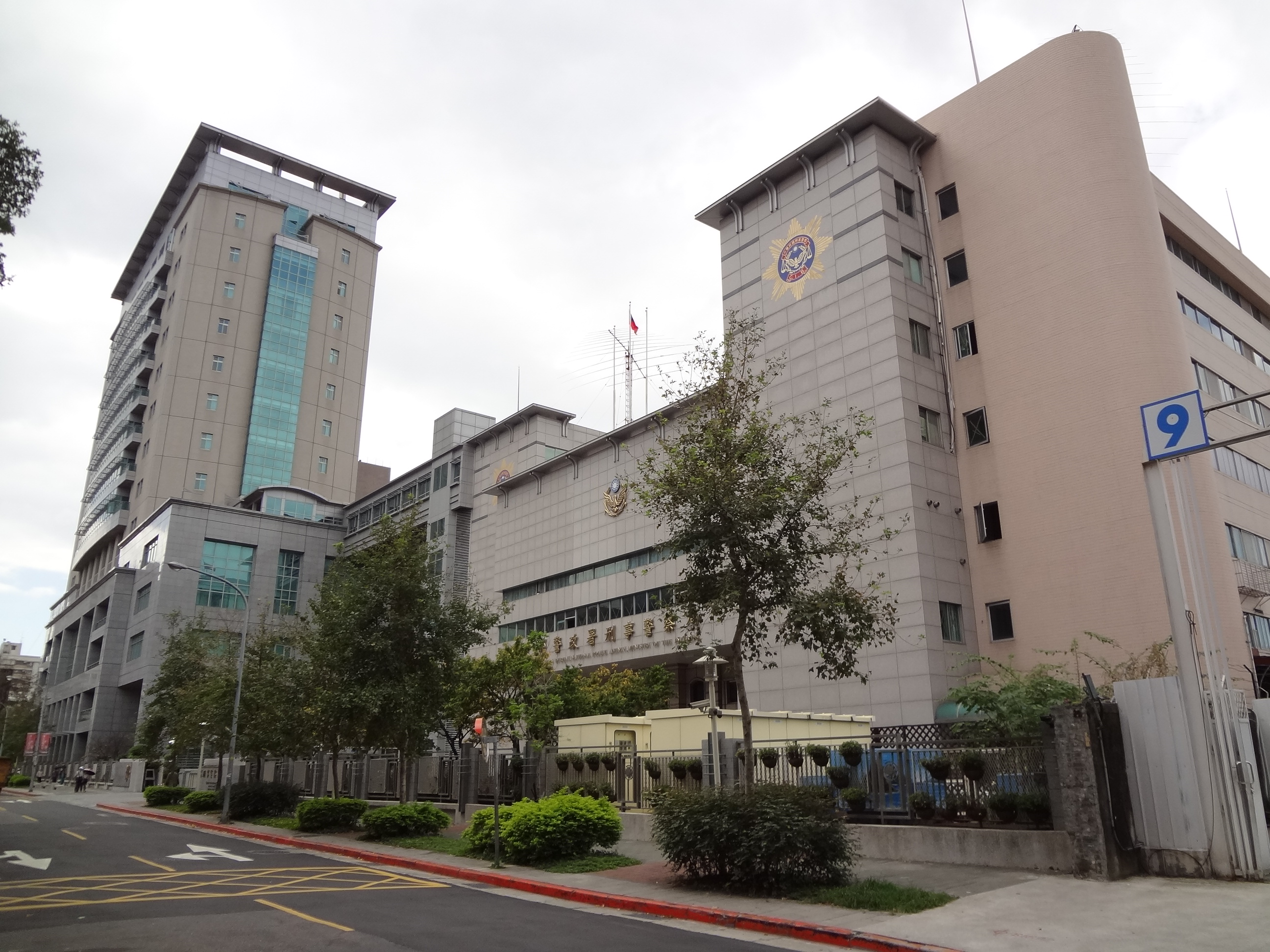
Criminal Investigation Bureau

The Criminal Investigation Bureau (CIB) is responsible for the investigation of high-profile crimes, forensics, and computer-related crimes. The CIB staff is split into the following groups:

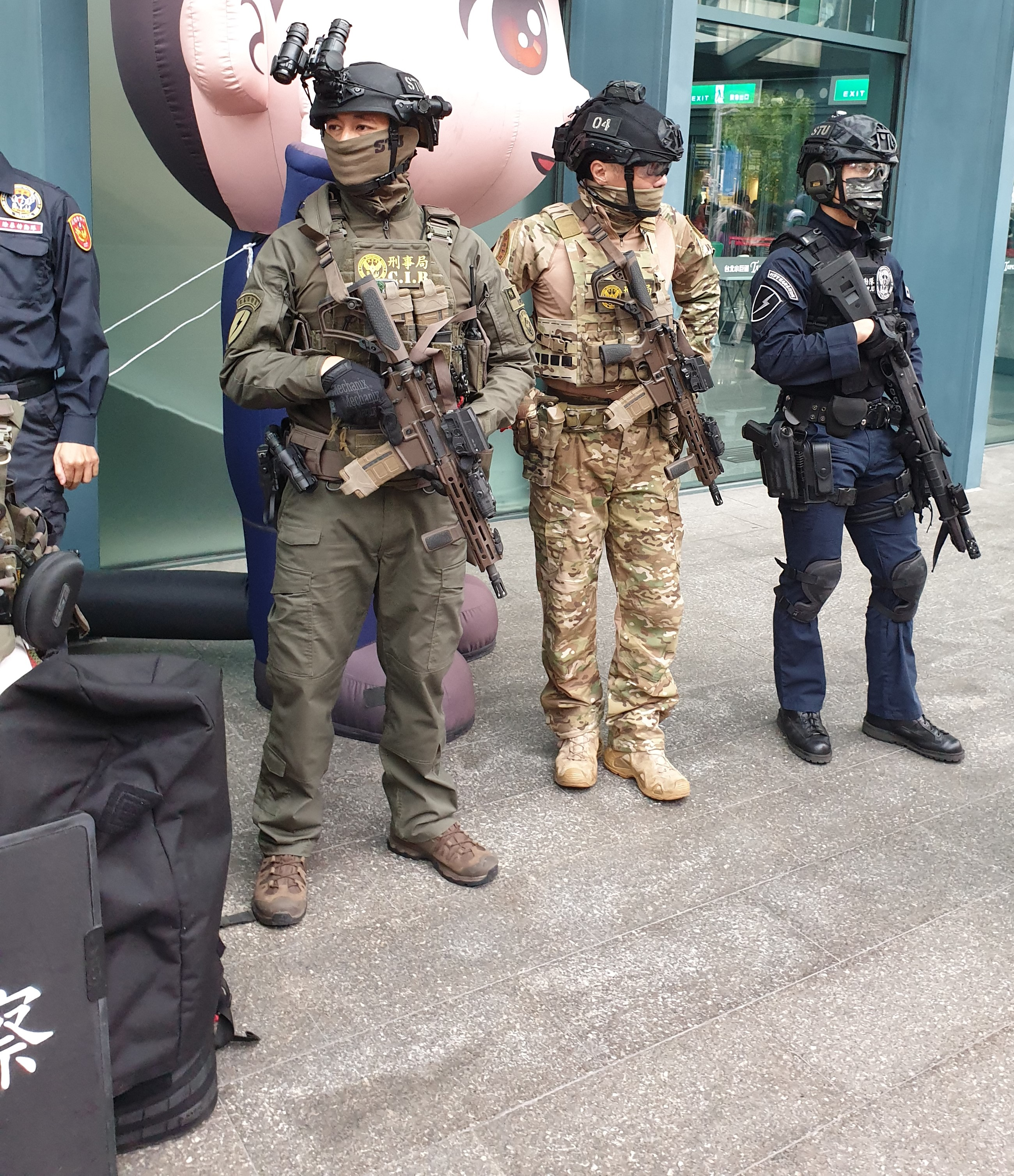
Criminal Investigation Bureau (CIB) Special Tactical Unit

- Crime Prevention and Detection Command Center: Code-named Telephone Extension Number 8.
- Crime Prevention Section
- Crime Investigation Section
- Anti-Hoodlum Section
- Laws & Regulations Research Section
- Criminal Records Section
- International Criminal Affairs Section
- INTERPOL Radio Center
- Research & Development Office
- Public Relations Office
- Logistics Section
- Secretariat
- Internal Affairs Office
- Public Security Office
- Personnel Office
- Accounting Office
- Special Tactical Unit

There are also nine active field police squads

- 1st brigade: Homicide and unregistered weapons.
- 2nd brigade: Robbery and sex-related crimes.
- 3rd brigade: Controlled substances and organized crime.
- 4th brigade: Burglary, kidnapping and blackmail.
- 5th brigade: Bombs Disposal and Investigation.
- 6th and 8th brigades: Rapid reaction units in central and southern Taiwan.
- 7th brigade: Financial crimes.
- 9th brigade: Cybercrimes.

There are also two task-force-grouped centers:

Forensic Science Center:

Forensic Section(Criminalistics Office): The Emeritus consultant is Henry Chang-Yu Lee, Ph.D., in Connecticut, United States.
Forensic Biology Office(Medical Examiner Office): The Emeritus consultant is Yang Zi-song(zh:楊日松), M.D., retired.
Fingerprint Office

High-Technology Crime Prevention Center: It was formed on 6 April 2006.

9th brigade
Electronic surveillance and monitoring center (on cellular telephone networks in private corporations, such as FET)
Information management office

==== Special Police Corps ====
There are seven individual Special Police Corps(Chinese: 保安警察總隊; pinyin: Bǎo'ān jǐngchá zǒng duì). They are mobile, rapid-deployment police forces. Additionally, they execute various sentry duties and serve as a pool of reserve formations for police operations.

A task-force-grouped SWAT units in the First Corps are referred to as Peace Enforcing Special Service Forces or "Wei-An" Forces; literally “Safety Maintenance Special Operations Group” (Chinese: 維安特勤隊; pinyin: Wéi ān tèqín duì). Officially translated into English as the Special Operations Group (SOG), they constitute the national-level counterterrorism unit.

The uniforms and equipment of the SOG units are similar to local Police tactical unit, which are referred to in English as Thunder Squads (Chinese: 霹靂小組; pinyin: Pīlì Xiǎozǔ) .The Thunder Squads are subordinate to local police departments and are the equivalent of SWAT units in the US.

==== The First Corps ====
The First Corps serves as a training base for courses of in-service training and mobile task forces. It is responsible for riot control, special weapons and tactics, and counterterrorism in northern Taiwan. The corps commands six special police brigades and one S.O.G "Wei-an" Forces (Chinese: 維安特勤隊; pinyin: Wéi ān tèqín duì). Three brigades of conscripts, 2nd, 5th and 6th, served like combat police in Korea, are usually deployed for Riot control.

- Corps Headquarters, 2nd, 3rd, 4th brigades, and one "Wei-An" Forces, are stationed in Si-pai, Taipei City.
  - "Wei-an" Forces: Formed in June 1992. Its mission specialties are counter-terrorism, high-profile hostage rescues, and presidential protection. These forces are composed of SWAT units divided into two companies, and garrisoned in Taipei, Taoyuan, Taichung and Kaohsiung.
- 1st and 5th brigades are stationed in Sanxia District, New Taipei City.
- The 6th brigade is stationed in Xinwu District, Taoyuan City.

==== The Second Corps ====
The Second Corps consists of four brigades commended by the Ministry of Economic Affairs. It is for security duty of all governmental business units and Taiwan Power Company under the Ministry of Economic Affairs and all Science Parks of National Science Council.

- The first brigade is especially tasked for the copyright protection and the enforcement of counterfeit and infringement in related to intellectual property. It is usually code-named Intellectual Property Protection Brigade.
- The 2nd is to guard three nuclear power plants (Nuclear No.1, No.2, and No.4) of Taiwan Power Company in New Taipei City.
- The 3rd is in northern Taiwan for the security duty of two Science Parks in Hsinchu and Taichung under National Science Council, and the other industrial parks, import-export districts, and certain government installations of the Ministry of Economic Affairs.
- The 4th is in southern Taiwan for the security duty of all governmental business installations under the National Science Council and the Ministry of Economic Affairs, which includes one nuclear power plant: "Nuclear No.3."

==== The Third Corps ====
The Third Corps is a part of border police and provides supportive and supplemental duty of Customs Services of Ministry of Finance.

==== The Fourth Corps ====
The Fourth Corps are responsible for riot control, special weapons and tactics, and counter-terrorism in central Taiwan.

- "Wei-an" Forces: In March 2003, two more task force-sized SWAT groups of "Wei-an" Forces were formed. One of them is attached to the 4th Special Police Corps in Taichung, which is located in central Taiwan.

==== The Fifth Corps ====
The Fifth Corps are responsible for riot control, special weapons and tactics, and counter-terrorism in southern Taiwan.

- "Wei-an" Forces: In March 2003, two task-force SWAT groups were formed. One is attached to the 5th Special Police Corps in southern Taiwan.

==== The Sixth Corps ====
The Sixth Corps is responsible for the physical security of central government buildings, high-ranking civilian officials, foreign embassies, and liaison institutes.

==== The Seventh Corps ====
The Seventh Special Police Corps, 7SPC, was established on January 1, 2014, aiming to solve the growing problems of nature reservation, environment protection and forest and National Parks guarding. The structure of the 7SPC is similar to that of National Park Service rangers in the United States, who are government officials tasked with maintaining law and order.Their duties primarily involve the enforcement of the Forestry Act, the National Park Law, and the Environmental Protection Act.

==== Civil Defense Force ====
The Civil Defense Force (民防防情指揮管制所) is administered by the NPA.

==== Other NPA Units ====
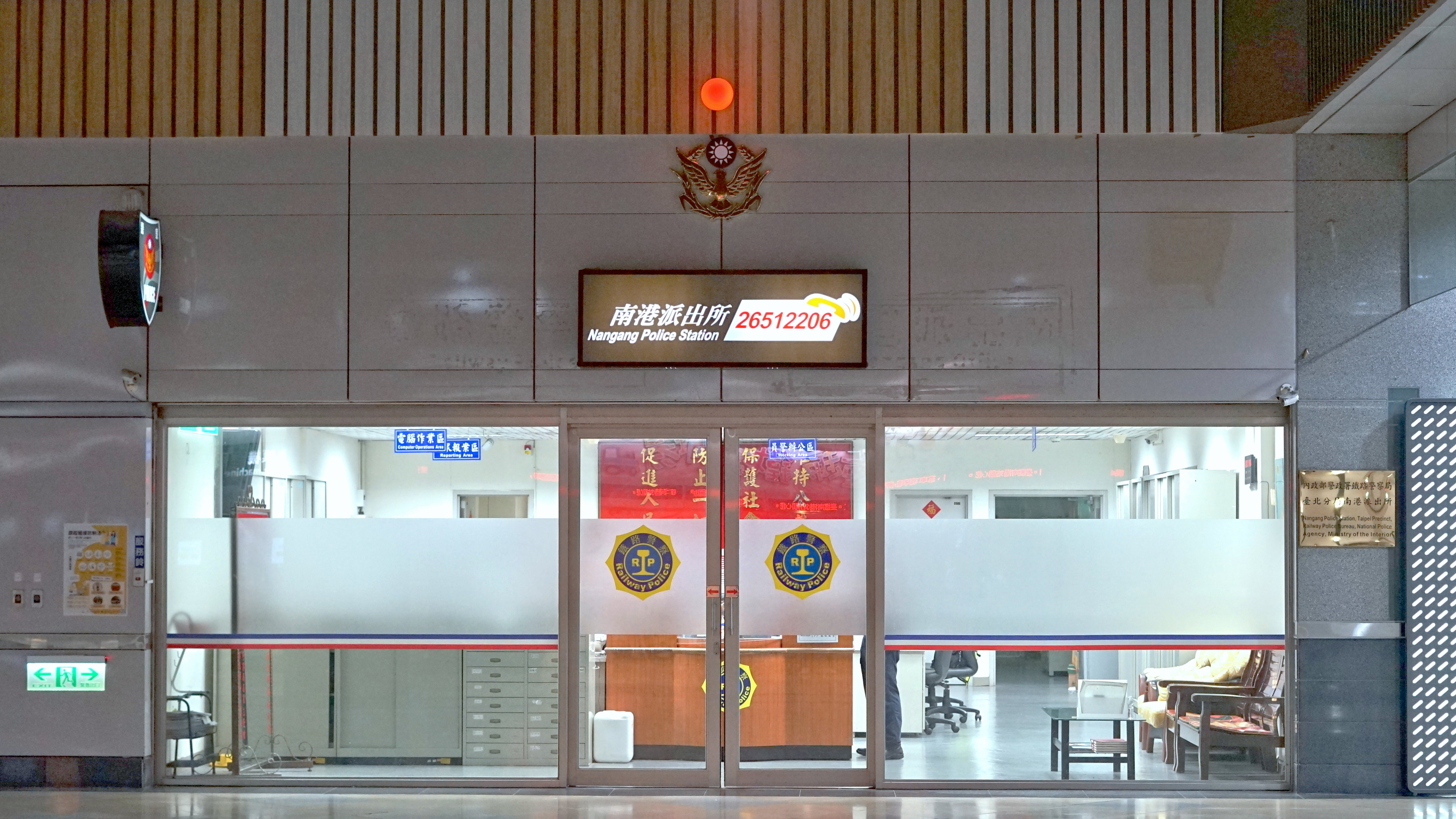
A Railway Police station

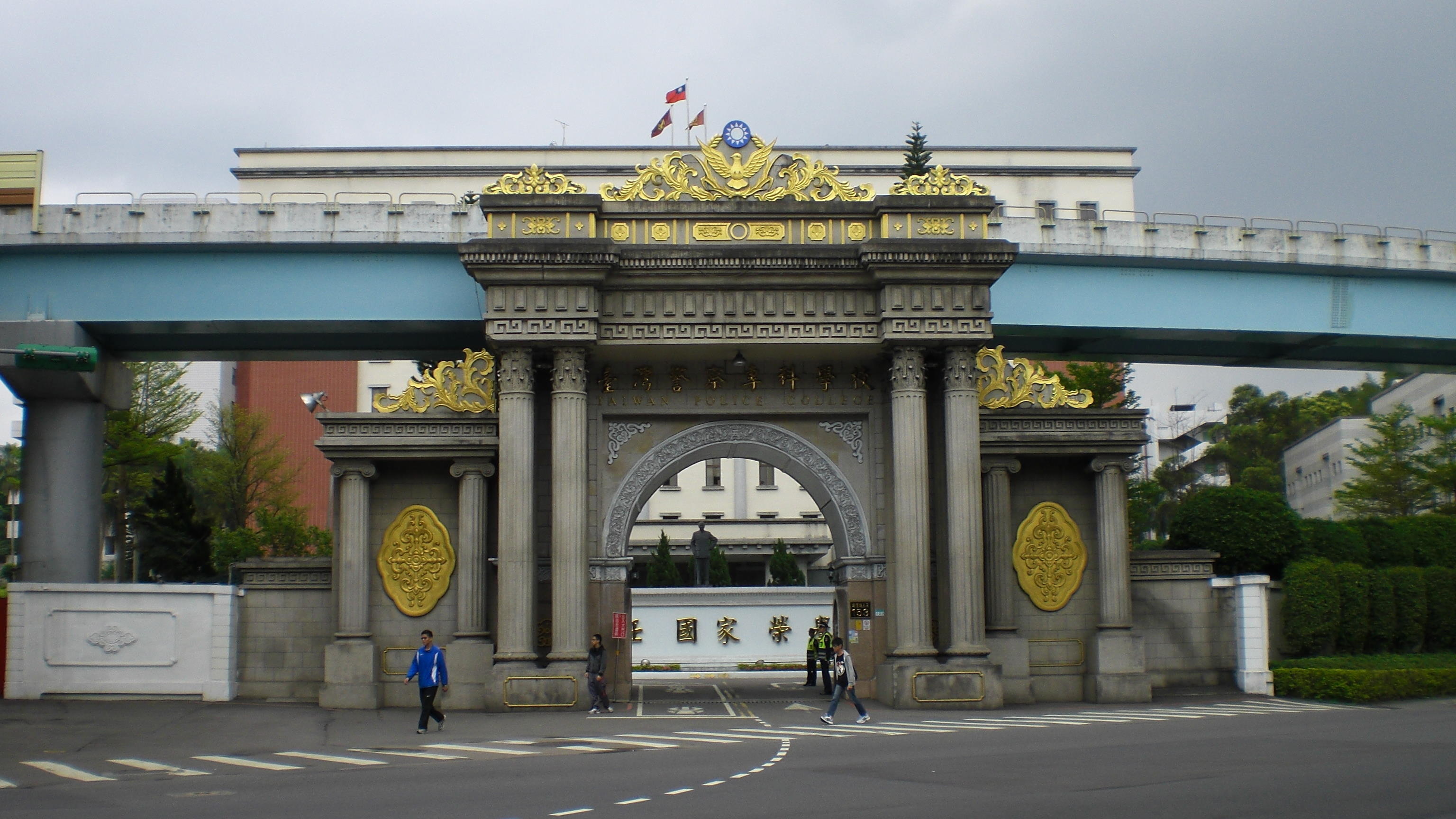
Taiwan Police College

The Immigration Bureau (入出境管理局) was removed from NPA and reorganized as the National Immigration Agency on 2 January 2007.

- National Highway Police Bureau (國道公路警察局): Jurisdiction over national highways.

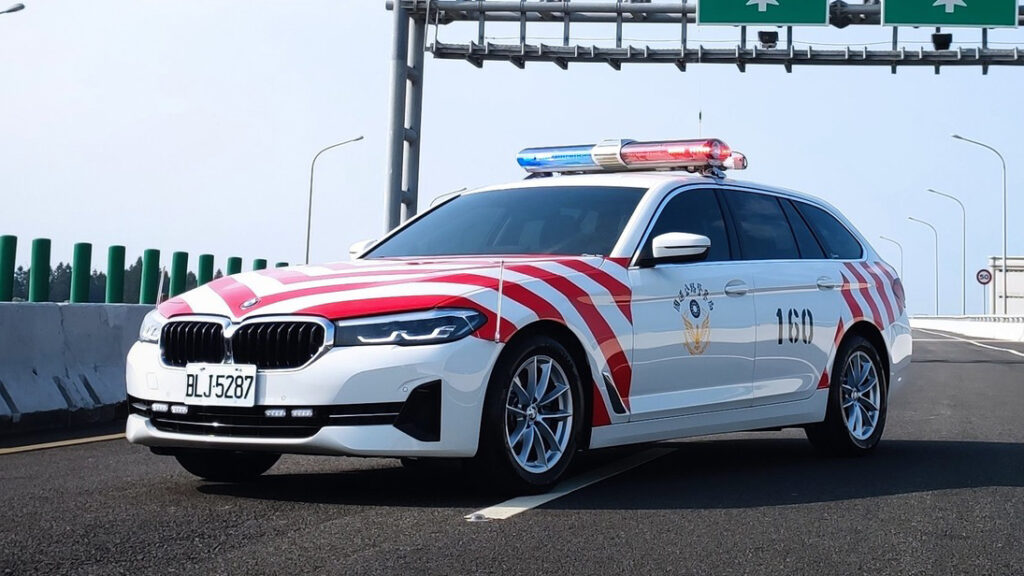
A BMW 5-Series police car from the National Highway Police Bureau, which has a distinctive red-white striped livery

- Harbor Police Offices (港務警察局): Part of border police in Taiwan. There are four separate offices with jurisdictions over the ports of Keelung, Taichung, Kaohsiung and Hualien.
- Railway Police Bureau (鐵路警察局): Jurisdiction over stations and facilities of Taiwan Railway (then Taiwan Railway Administration) since 1949 and Taiwan High Speed Rail since 26 December 2006.

The 1st section: facilities of TR, north of Taichung in western Taiwan
The 2nd section: facilities of TR, south of Taichung in western Taiwan
The 3rd section: facilities of TR in eastern Taiwan
The THSR section: facilities of THSR

- Aviation Police Bureau (航空警察局): The Airport police is a part of border police and responsible for safeguarding, traffic administration, crime investigation, documents inspection, security examination etc. at local civil airports in the ROC. Its headquarters is at Taiwan Taoyuan International Airport.
- National Park Police Corps (國家公園警察大隊): Jurisdiction over the national parks, specialization in search and rescue operations.
- Taiwan Police College
- Police Armory (警察機械修理廠)
- Police Telecommunications Office (警察電訊所)
- Police Radio Station (警察廣播電臺): A government public radio station run by civilians. It broadcasts regular radio show programs, news, and real-time traffic situations.

==== Task-Force Formations under NPA ====
By separate decrees of The Executive Yuan, three task-force formations, each consisting of approximately two hundred police officers with different specialties, is formed under the National Police Agency but attached to two cabinet-level institutions or other units.

- Telecommunication Police Corps (電信警察隊): In January 1998, a task force called the "Telecommunication Police Corps" was formed and attached to the Ministry of Transportation and Communications. Since 2 February 2006, the Telecommunication Police Corps are re-attached to the National Communication Commission. Its job is to enforce laws concerning the radio spectrum and telecommunications.
- Environmental Protection Police Corps (環保警察隊): It was formed in 1999 and is attached to the Environmental Protection Administration. There are currently 192 policemen serving as Environmental Protection Police and are assigned to three brigades at Taipei City, Taichung City and Fongshan City in Northern, Central and Southern Taiwan, respectively.
- Forest & Nature Conservation Police Unit (森林暨自然保育警察隊): This unit was formed with 178 policemen on 1 July 2004 by the decree of the Executive Yuan on 6 August 2003, after ten forest arson cases in the mountain area of Taichung County (now part of Taichung City) within six years. It is attached to the Forest Bureau of the Council of Agriculture. Besides its headquarters in Taipei City, there are eight squadrons in Taiwan mountain area. Its main task is to support the forest patrolmen to preserve and protect the ecology system and all historic monuments in all the forests in Taiwan.

=== Ranks ===
Rank insignias are worn over the right breast pocket when in uniform. The rank system of the National Police Agency is as follows:

Ranks of Police Officer
Rank	Insignia
Police Rank 4 警佐四階
Police Rank 3 警佐三階
Police Rank 2 警佐二階
Police Rank 1 警佐一階
Police Officer Rank 4 警正四階 (Inspector)(Sub-Lieutenant)
Police Officer Rank 3 警正三階 (Senior inspector)(Captain)
Police Officer Rank 2 警正二階 (Superintendent)
Police Officer Rank 1 警正一階 (Senior Superintendent)
Police Supervisor Rank 4 警監四階 (Superintendent General)
Police Supervisor Rank 3 警監三階
Police Supervisor Rank 2 警監二階
Police Supervisor Rank 1 警監一階
Police Supervisor Rank Supreme (Police General) 警監特階

Before 1999, the lowest-ranking street policemen held the rank of Police Officer II, denoted by an insignia of two stars on one horizontal bar, and sometimes referred to colloquially as "一毛二" or "one dime and two cents." On 3 March 1999, an adjustment of "the table of police positions and corresponding ranks" or "各級警察機關學校警察官職務配階表", from the Ministry of Interior resulted in regular policemen or women on street holding the rank of Senior Police Officer, denoted by "three stars on one horizontal bar", nicknamed "一毛三" or "one dime and three cents."

To emphasize the independence of the ranks and the professions, the rank of ROC police may not perfectly match their positions in a station. In 2007, the rank of the Police General was created above Police Supervisor Rank 1 as the highest police rank. The holder of this rank is responsible for overseening the public safety of the entire nation.

== Equipment ==
=== Weapons ===
Aside from firearms, police officers are also equipped with non-lethal weapons such as batons, pepper spray and tasers.

Name	Country of origin	Type	Notes
Walther PPQ M2	Germany	Semi-automatic pistol	Standard issue sidearm
SIG Sauer P226	United States	Semi-automatic pistol	
Glock	Austria	Semi-automatic pistol	
Uzi	Israel	Submachine gun	
Heckler & Koch MP5	Germany	Submachine gun	
SIG MPX	United States	Submachine gun	
SIG MCX	United States	Assault rifle	
SG 551-1P	United States	Assault rifle	
SIG Sauer SIG516	United States	Assault rifle	
M16A2 rifle	United States	Assault rifle	
M4 carbine	United States	Assault rifle	
Mk 18	United States	Assault rifle	
T65 assault rifle	Republic of China	Assault rifle	To be replaced

== History ==
The current police service in Taiwan traces its origins to police forces established in Taiwan during the Japanese colonial period, as well as police services established in mainland China during the early 20th century.

The ROC's law enforcement system was built upon the foundations established during the Qing dynasty with the creation of the Peking Public Inspection Headquarters in 1902. Following the overthrow of the Qing dynasty and the establishment of the Republic in 1912, a National Police Department was established under the auspices of the Ministry of the Interior. This early centralized system consisted of a national headquarters in the capital, provincial police administrations for each province, police departments, and bureaus at the municipal and county level, respectively. This system was extended to Taiwan following its transfer to ROC control in 1947, two years after the close of hostilities in World War II, though the basic system from the Japanese era was retained.

In 1972, to streamline organizational costs, the National Police Department was merged with the Taiwan Police Administration to form the new National Police Agency (NPA).

The first four Directors-General of NPA, between 1972 and 1990, were active general officers transferred from Army or Marine Corps:

Chou Ju-cun (周菊村), between 1972 and 1976;
Kong Ling-Cheng (zh:孔令晟), between 1976 and June 1980;
Ho En-ting (何恩廷), between June 1980 and 1 August 1984;
Luo Chang (羅張), between 1 August 1984 and 4 August 1990.

The latter three also served as two-star Marine Corps Commandants.

=== Secret police organizations ===
Historically, unlike Special Higher Police (Tokko) and the Japanese Military police (Kempeitai) during the Japanese Colonial era, the secret police activity was not the primary task of Taiwan police system during the Martial-Law era.

During this period, the Taiwan police system generally played as a supportive role, including performing frequent surveillance. Nevertheless, the governmental body of Taiwan police system back then was and still is subjective to the supervision and coordination of National Security Bureau of the ROC National Security Council. Most secret-police work were held up by other security units.

Several units during the martial-law era, such as the National Security Bureau and the National Bureau of Investigation, were widely feared by the people of Taiwan. Followed by the end of Martial-Law, many of these so-called "secret police" units were legalized, and transformed into intelligence-oriented or law-enforcement units, or disbanded.

One notable example which involved multiple security agencies was the case of Peng Ming-min, the prominent Taiwanese political prisoner since the 1960s. After being reported by several civilians, Peng was at first arrested by a police detail from local police station in Taipei City. Immediately, he was sent to Taiwan Garrison Command for interrogation, which was led by its Division of Political Warfare. He was subsequently courted-martial by a military tribunal organized by "Division of Judge Advocate General" of Taiwan Garrison Command. Peng was pardoned in 1965, but put under house arrest. In 1966, Peng's case was then discussed by National Security Council and transferred from Taiwan Garrison Command to Bureau of Investigation. Until his escape in January, 1970, Peng remained under regular police visits and constant surveillance from agents of the Bureau of Investigation.

=== Post-Martial Law era reforms ===
In 1990, Chuang Heng-dai (莊亨岱), then Commissioner of Railway Police Bureau, became the first career police officer with a background of a criminal investigator to serve as Director-General of the NPA. Since then, all the successive directors-general of NPA are promoted from career police officers in active duty within the Taiwan police system.

The Taiwan Provincial Police Administration was again separated from the NPA in 1995 following the implementation of local autonomy statutes in the ROC Constitution. Fire-fighting units also ceased to be part of the NPA from that year and were reorganized into a separate fire department. The National Fire Agency of Ministry of Interior was established on 1 March 1995 to oversee fire prevention, disaster rescue, and emergency medical service.

In 1999, with the downsizing of the provincial level of government, the Taiwan Provincial Police Administration was dissolved, and its personnel and responsibilities were once again transferred to the National Police Agency.

Rising crime rates and liberalization of the mass media in the 1990s led to many questions concerning the effectiveness of the police force in investigating and fighting crime, as opposed to its prior concentration on crowd and riot control, a carryover from the martial law era.

=== Recent years ===
With increased media coverage in recent years and the proliferation of tabloid newspapers and 24-hour cable news channels throughout Taiwan, the police force has been faced with new challenges involving high-profile crimes, and increased media involvement. Past concerns of police corruption have largely been replaced by concerns of police ineffectiveness, particularly in light of several high-profile cases in recent years. Gun-related crime has also increased, though the overall crime rate in Taiwan remains lower than that of most Western and Asian nations.

On 22 July 2000, four workers carrying out riverbed construction work in the Pachang River of Chiayi County became stranded after being surrounded by rapidly rising waters. The four were trapped in the center of the river for three hours while waiting for a helicopter that never came, and were finally washed away at around 7:08 pm in sight of family members, rescue personnel, and the news crews on the riverbank.

The delay in rescue operations was attributed to bureaucratic red tape, leading to the resignations of three top government officials, including Yu Shyi-kun, the vice Premier of Executive Yuan and two Director-Generals from National Police Agency and National Fire Agency. This Pachang-Creek incident (zh:八掌溪事件) generated widespread media attention in Taiwan and triggered a reform of the airborne emergency management system. On 10 March 2004, the newly formed National Airborne Service Corps (NASC) of the Ministry of Interior absorbed four civil airborne squadrons.

The Airborne Squadron of National Police Agency,
The Preparatory Office of the Airborne Fire Fighting Squadron of National Fire Agency,
The Aviation Team of Civil Aeronautics Administration of Ministry of Transportation and Communications,
The Air Patrol Squadron of the Coast Guard Administration.

NASC takes over the responsibilities of five major airborne tasks: Search and Rescue, Disaster Relief, Emergency Medical Services, Reconnaissance and Patrol, and Transportation.

On 26 July 2004, members of the Criminal Investigation Bureau engaged in what was described as the largest gun battle in the history of modern Taiwan with members of a kidnapping gang in Kaohsiung County (now part of Kaohsiung City). Although the officers held a numerical advantage, they found themselves outgunned by the suspects who possessed bulletproof vests and M16 rifles. During the ensuring shootout, four police officers were injured, and two suspects were shot and arrested. However, the ringleader of the gang managed to escape along with a cohort after holding a passing civilian hostage and escaping in a hijacked car on live TV. The ensuing manhunt was widely covered, and the ringleader Chang Hsi-ming) was finally arrested following another gun battle with police on 13 July 2005.

On 28 February 2006, Hou You-yi, the Criminal Investigation Bureau Commissioner, assumed command as the director-general of the National Police Agency. A career criminal investigator, he is the youngest-ever to hold the position. Wang Cho-chiun, Chief of Taipei City Police Department, was named as the new director-general effective June 2008.

On 2 Jan 2007, under the Organic Law of the National Immigration Agency enacted on 30 Nov 2005, the NPA's former Immigration Office was expanded to become the National Immigration Agency under the direct control of the Ministry of the Interior. Wu Cheng-chi (吳振吉) was named the first director general of NIA.

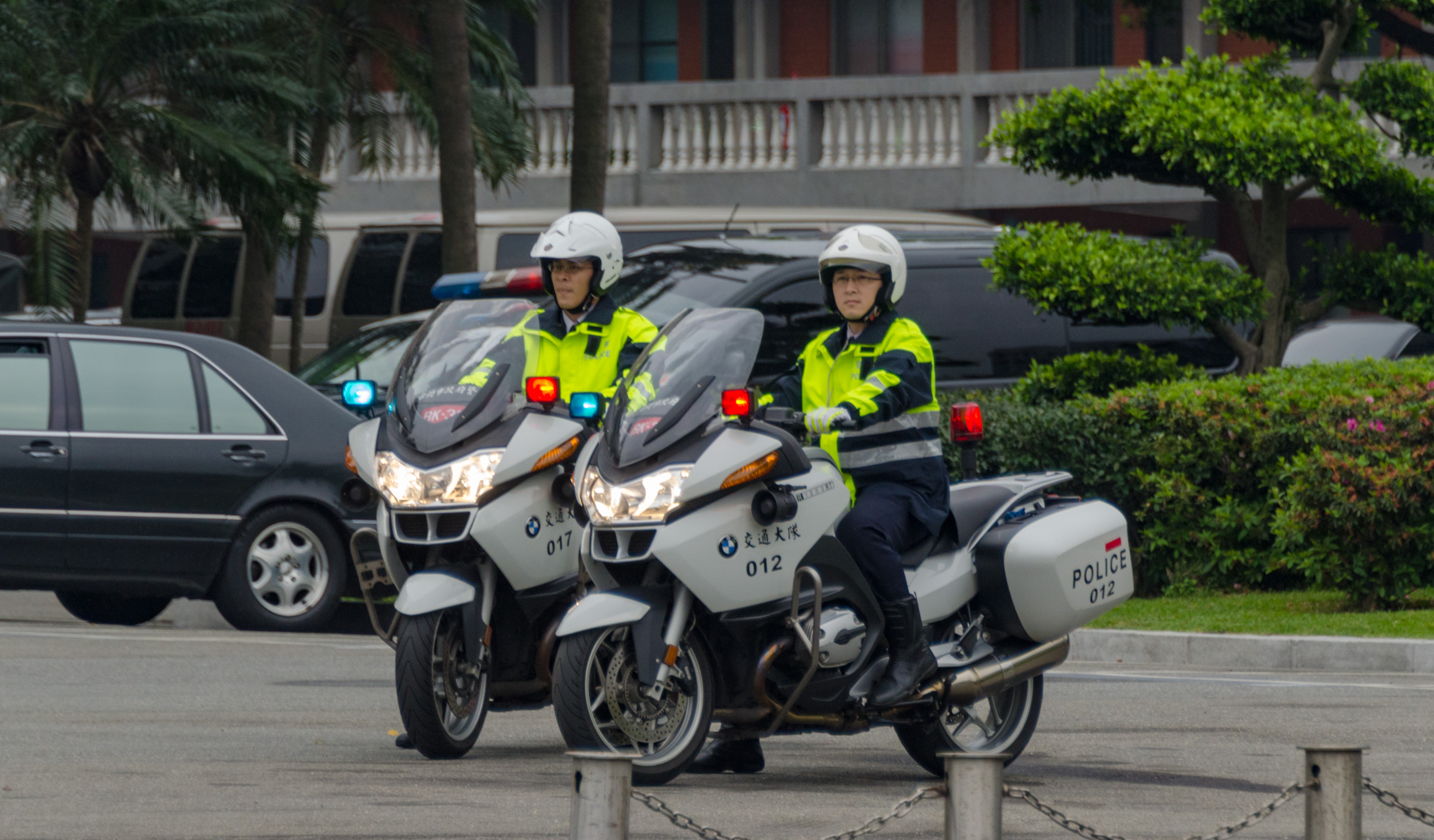
Traffic Police riding on BMW motorcycle in Taipei.

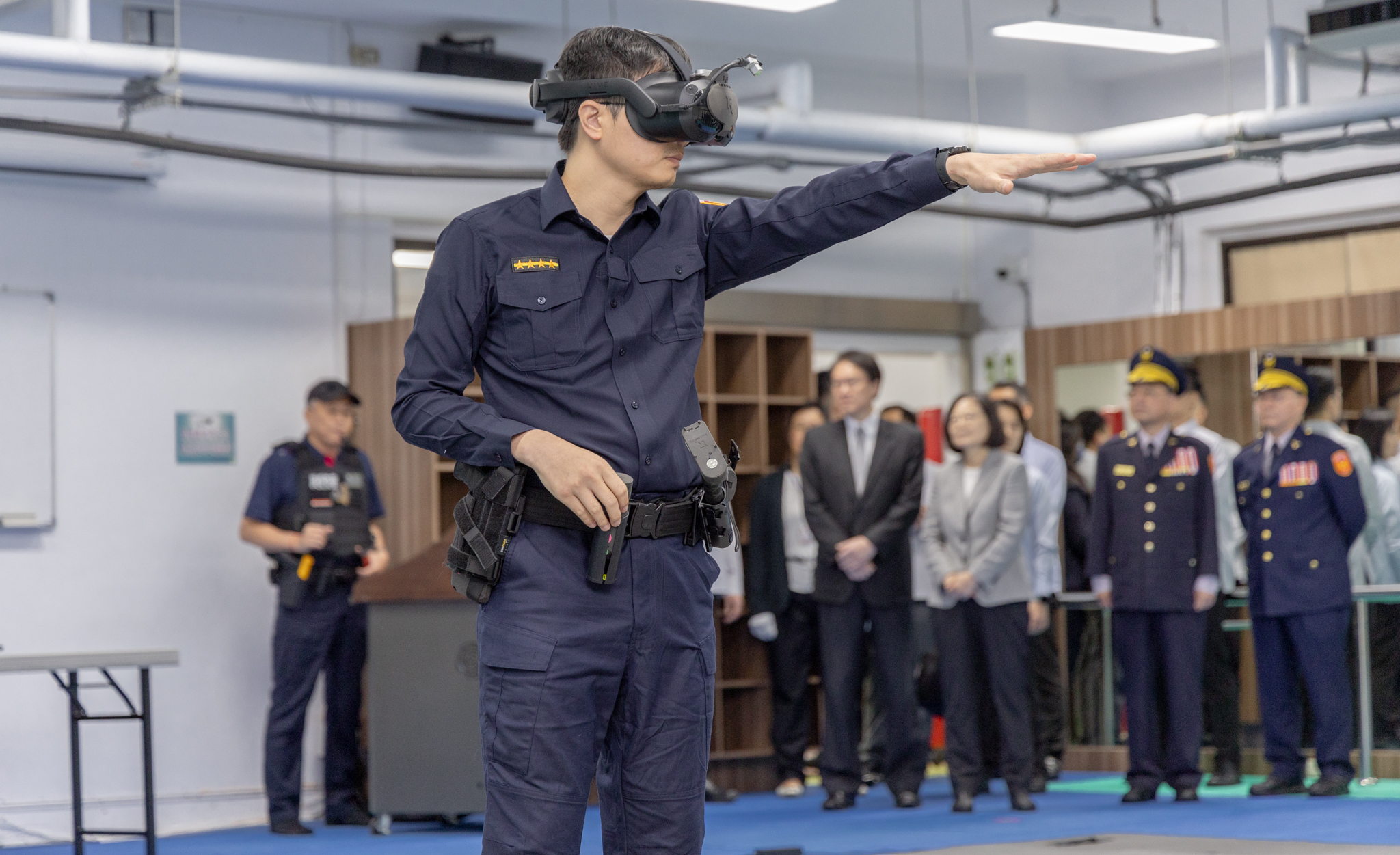
Police officers during training.

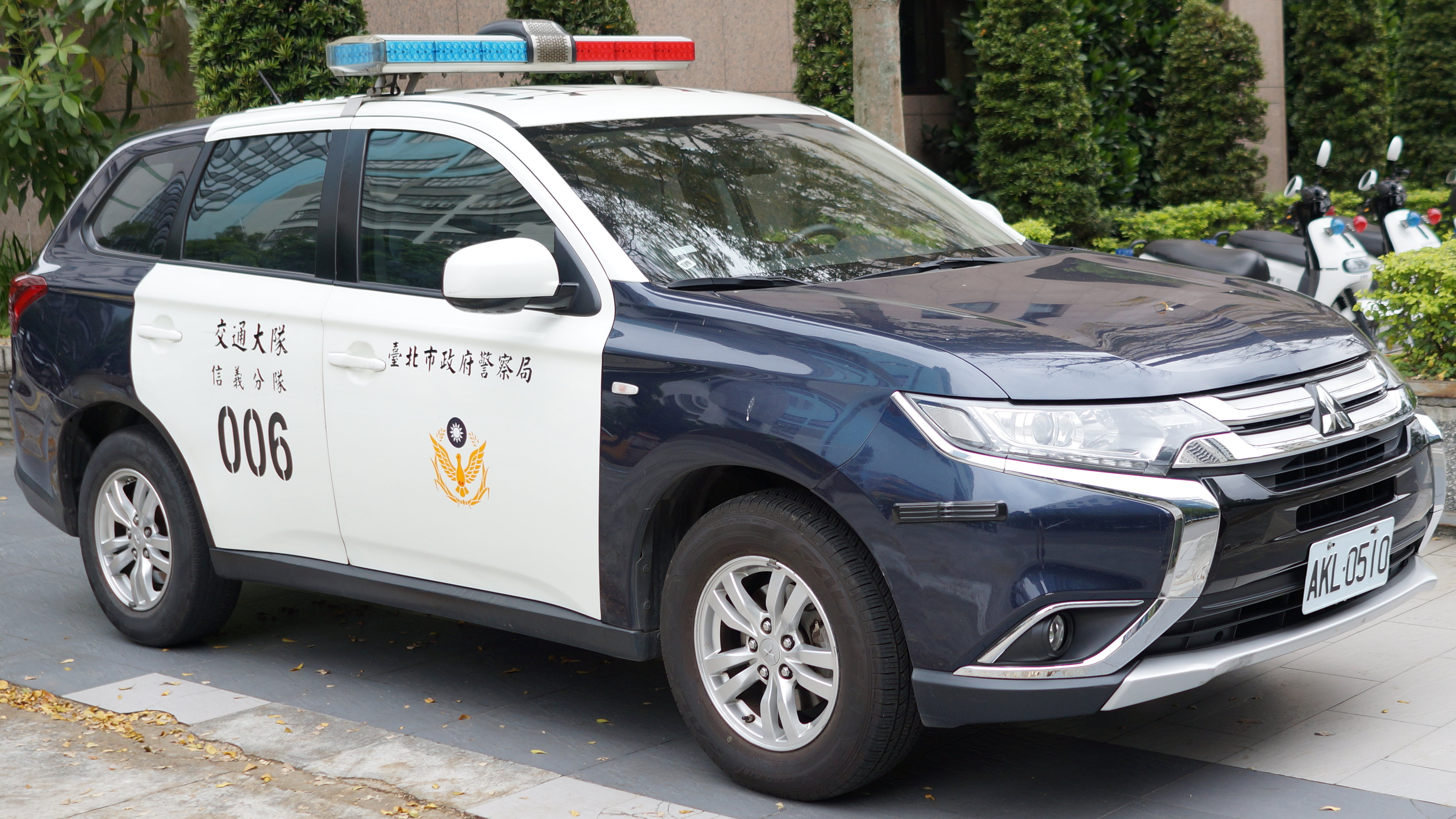
A Mitsubishi Outlander patrol vehicle of Taipei City Police Department.

== Other duties ==
In addition to standard law-enforcement duties, police in the ROC are also responsible for other duties, such as taking census data and immigration and visa related issues. Most jurisdictions maintain a Foreign Affairs squad staffed by English speaking officers who handle visa enforcement and issues relating to foreigners or the foreign community in Taiwan.

== Interdepartmental cooperation ==
=== Bureau of Investigation ===
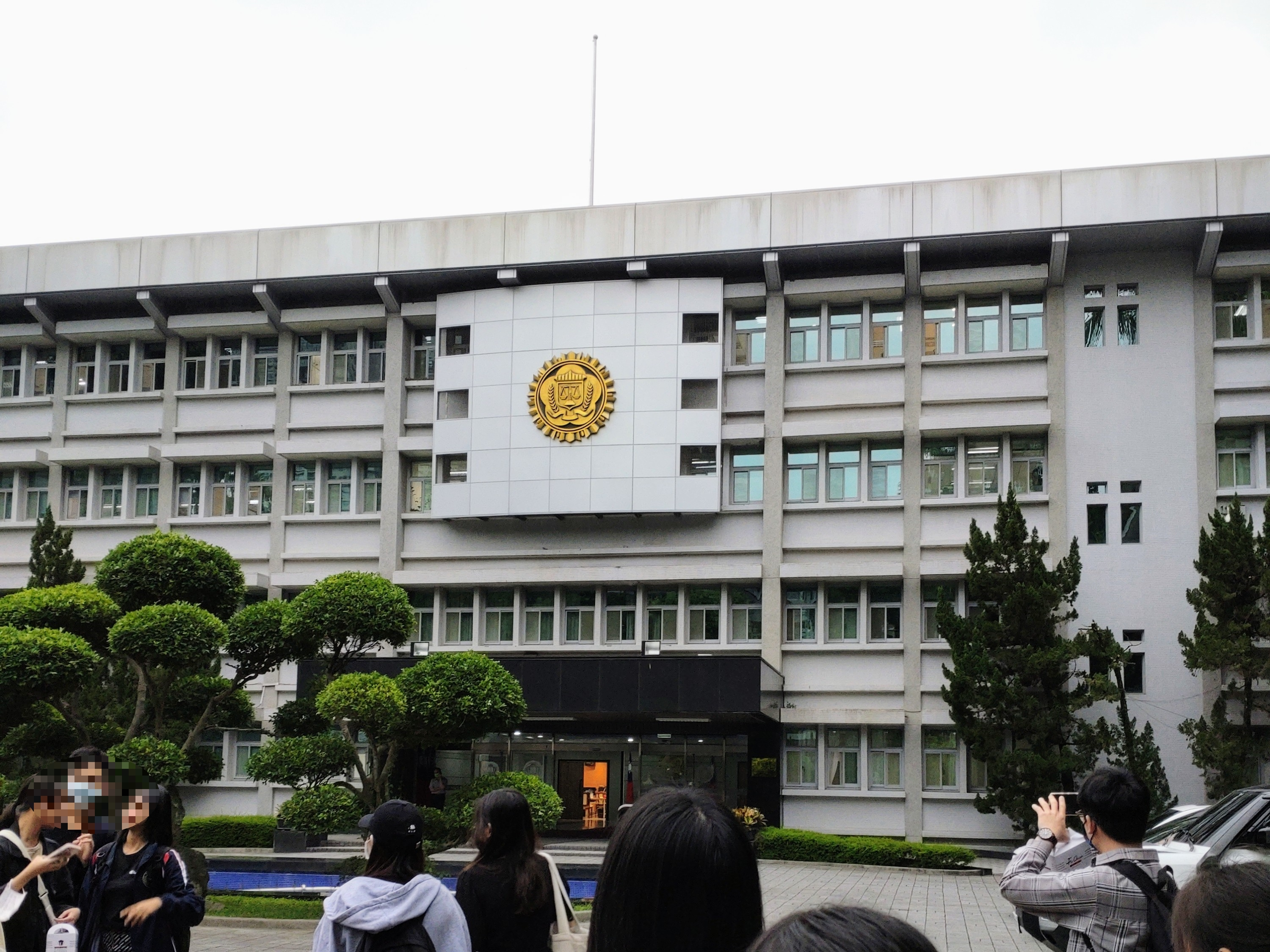
Ministry of Justice Investigation Bureau

Regarding drugs, corruption, espionage, and economic crimes, the Investigative Bureau of the Ministry of Justice (MJIB) has developed capabilities to cover cases in these areas for decades. The investigation of these cases, police corruption included, are usually transferred to or led by the Bureau of Investigation.

MJIB officers possess substantial laboratory and forensic capabilities relating to controlled substances, providing a necessary advantage and training for the investigators of MJIB. However, the police forces in the ROC still maintain several active drug enforcement squads at the local police departments and the Criminal Investigation Bureau of NPA.

Historically, counter-intelligence affairs have fallen primarily under the jurisdiction of the MJIB. Unlike "Special Branch" used in the police system in United Kingdom, the security divisions within all levels of Taiwan police system are mainly staff units rather than field units. Under the supervision of National Security Bureau, all non-mililary cases of espionage would soon be transferred to the Bureau of Investigation.

In recent years, high-ranking police officials tried to expand the capacity of investigating white-collar crimes in the ROC police system; however, they gained unnoticed progress. The MJIB is still in the lead position of cracking economic crimes or money-laundering. However, the Criminal Investigation Bureau of NPA has built fair reputation on copyright protection and the safety of computers networks.

Regarding the copyright issues, the 1st brigade of the 2nd special police corps is specifically tasked for the enforcement related to intellectual property.

=== Ministry of National Defense ===
==== Military Police ====
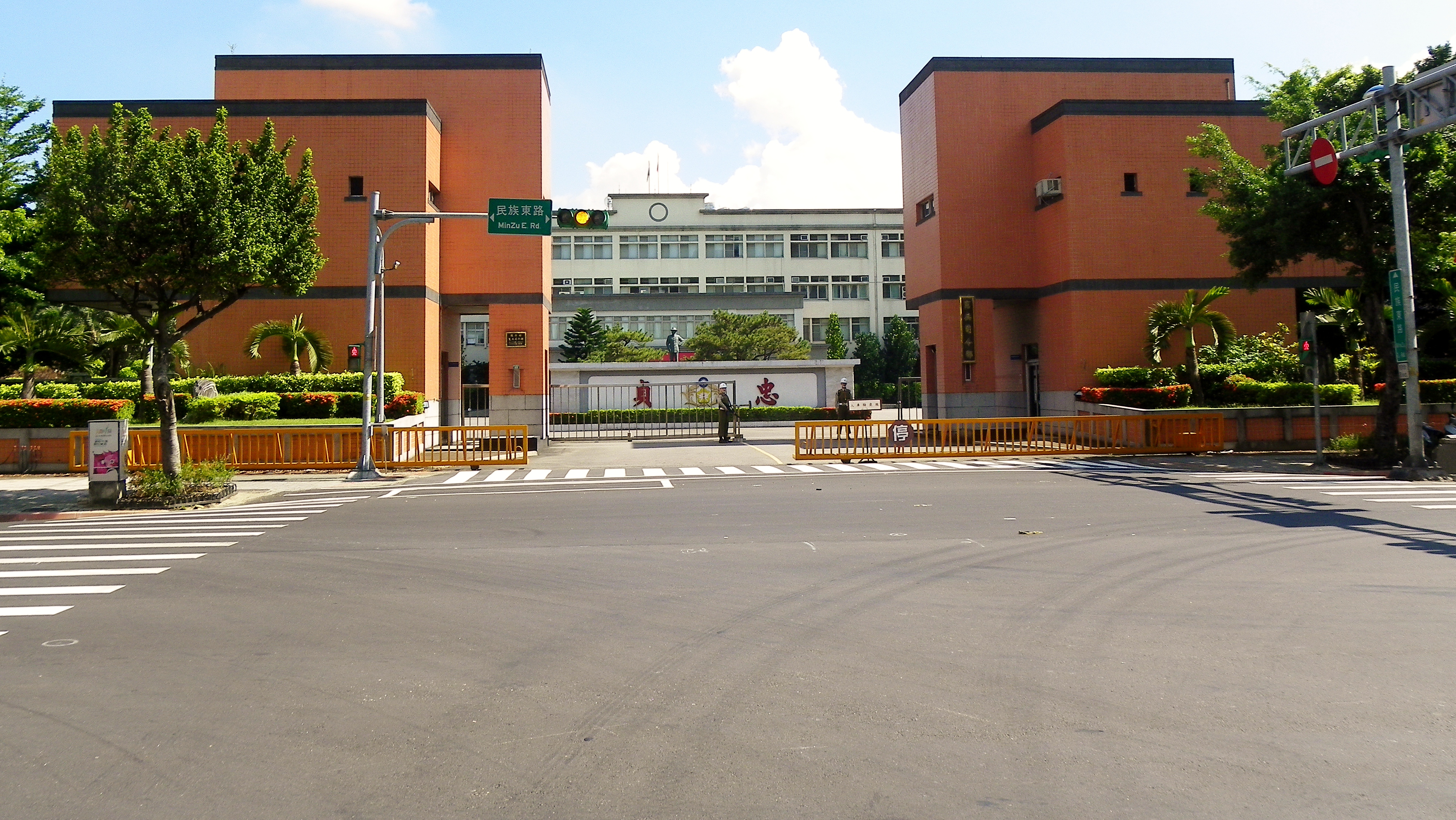
Military Police

According to the Law of the dispatching of Judicial Police Personnel, military police may investigate civilian matters under the supervision of the public prosecutor(s) from all court prosecutors' offices at all levels under the Ministry of Justice. Public prosecutors may also direct military police to handle large-scale searches or arrests when investigating cases of police-related crimes, prostitution, or fugitive recovery.

==== Counter-terrorism Special forces ====
Regarding counter-terrorism, there are three company-size troops of special forces under the operational control of the Ministry of National Defense:

- Northern Taiwan: Military Police Special Service Company (MPSSC, Code Name: Night Hawk), Military Police Command.
- Central Taiwan: Special Warfare Special Service Company, Aviation and Special Forces Command of the Republic of China Army.
- Southern Taiwan: Marine Special Service Company, Marine Corps Command of the Republic of China Navy.

These three are tasked to handle combat situations involving international terrorists or paramilitary-type criminals. Bound by current laws, only the Military Police Special Service Company can react to non-military cases, such as airplane hijacking.

=== Coast Guard ===
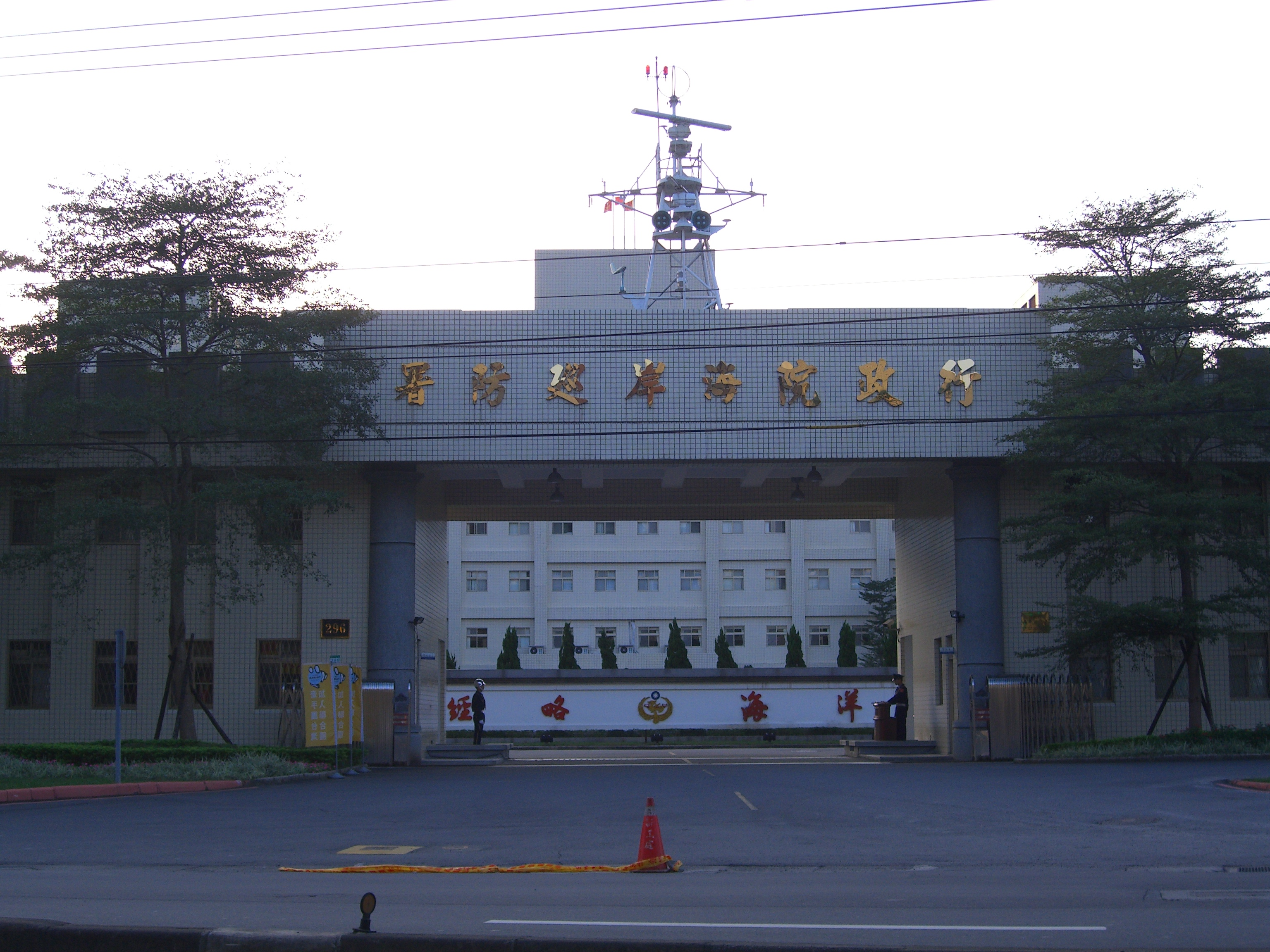
Coast Guard

The Coast Guard Administration (CGA) is considered a civilian law enforcement agency under the administration of the Ocean Affairs Council of the Executive Yuan, though during emergencies it may be incorporated as part of the Republic of China Armed Forces.

=== Fire Brigades ===
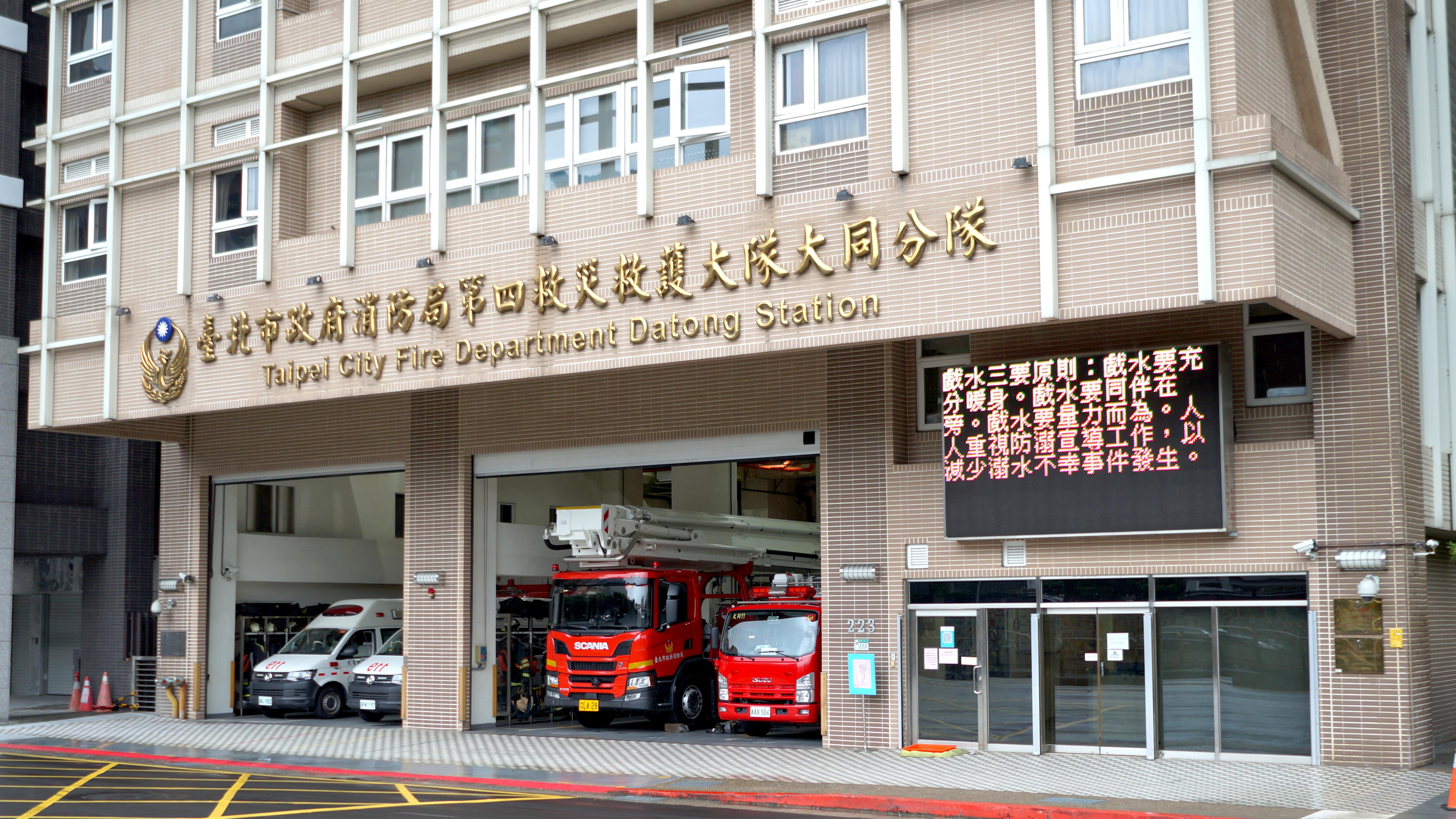
Fire brigades

Taiwan Firemen were a part of the Taiwan Police before 1995. At that time, the firemen were not highly regarded by some police chiefs. One notable case was in Taipei County (now New Taipei City) Police Department, where police commissioner Yao Kao-Chiao (姚高橋) assigned all his firemen to kitchen duty because he believed his fire policemen spent excessive time doing nothing except waiting for a fire to happen.

Yao Kao-Chiao served as Director-General of Central Police University from May 1995 to June 1996, Director-General of National Police Agency from June 1996 to 1997, and head of Coast Guard Administration from 28 January 2000 until 21 May 2000.

Another issue with Taiwan's former police-administered fire service involved radio cal signs for fire engines and rescue vehicles. For incentives to avoid unwanted attentions and to remain secrecy, all radio call signs for all police vehicles were uncorrelated with the missions of the subject vehicles, unnecessarily including fire trucks, rescue vehicles, and ambulances of fire brigades.

During emergency situations, the confusing call signs inevitably led to chaos and time delay. A successful fire chief, Chao Kang (趙鋼), convinced the police high command to rearrange the radio call sign assignment for all fire vehicles. Chao Kang then was appointed as the Commissioner of Taiwan Provincial Fire Administration, and the Director-General of National Fire Agency from 10 September 2000 to September 2002.

== Auxiliary Police ==
The Auxiliary Police (Traditional Chinese:義勇警察) is an organization of civilians who volunteer to support the police and perform civil defense tasks. Although the auxiliary police do not have a standard rank insignia, the Taipei City auxiliary Police has adopted a non-standard rank insignias with modified colors based on the current police rank insignias.

The flag of the Auxiliary Police

Ranks of The Auxilitary Police Officer(Taipei city)
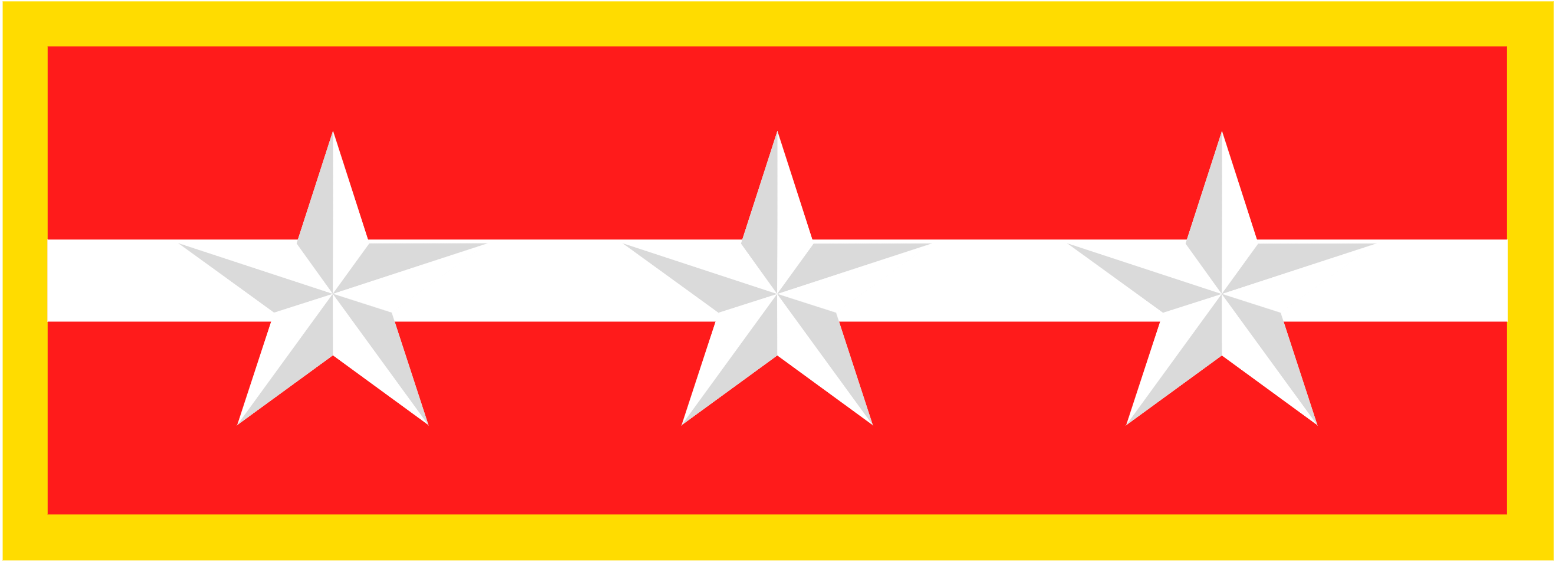
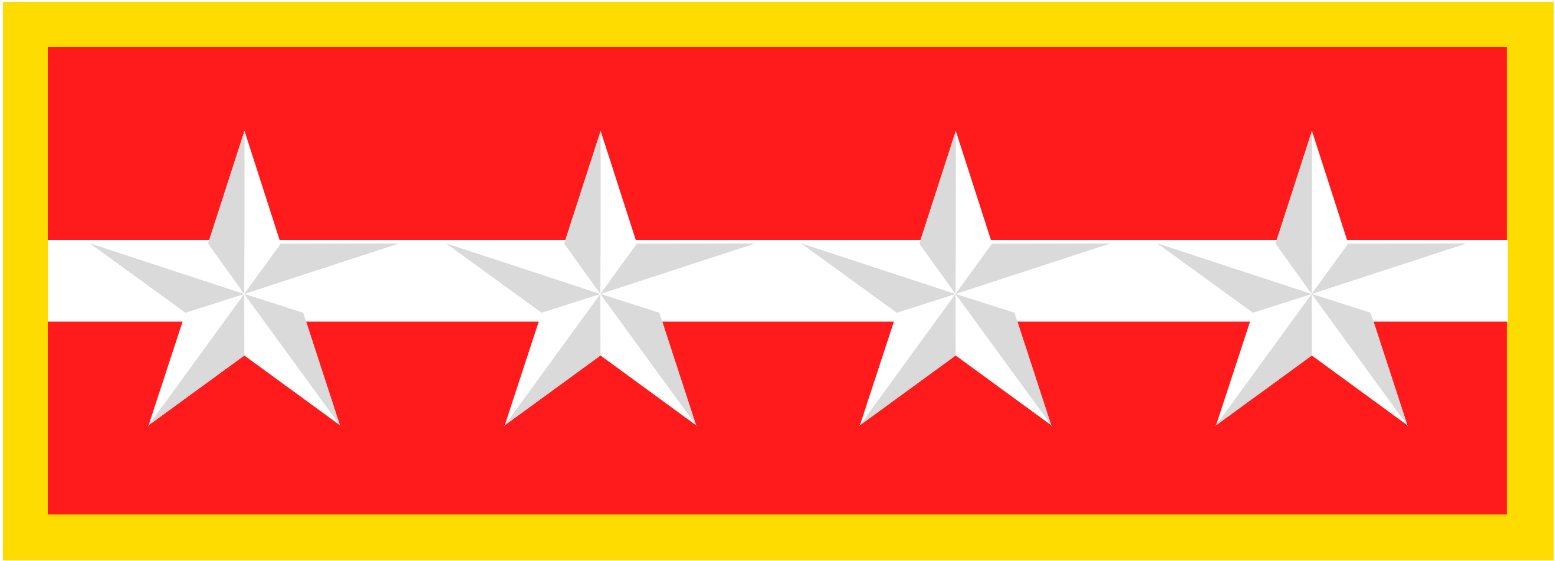
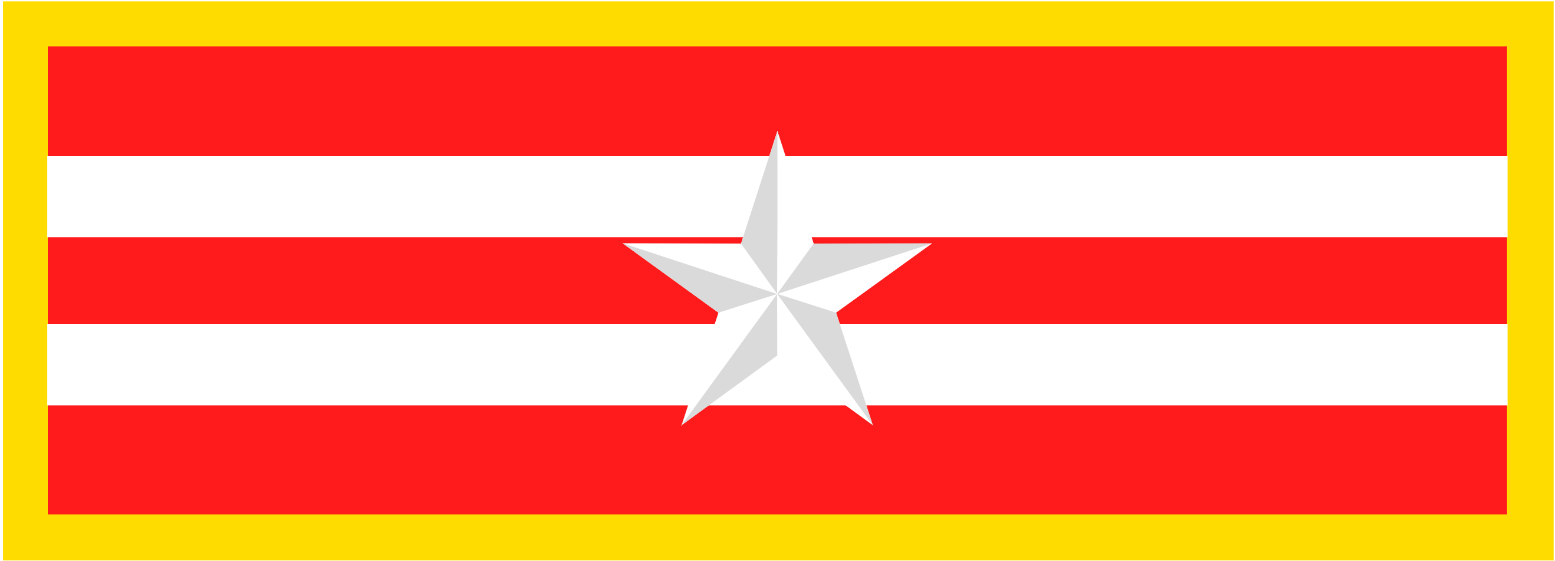
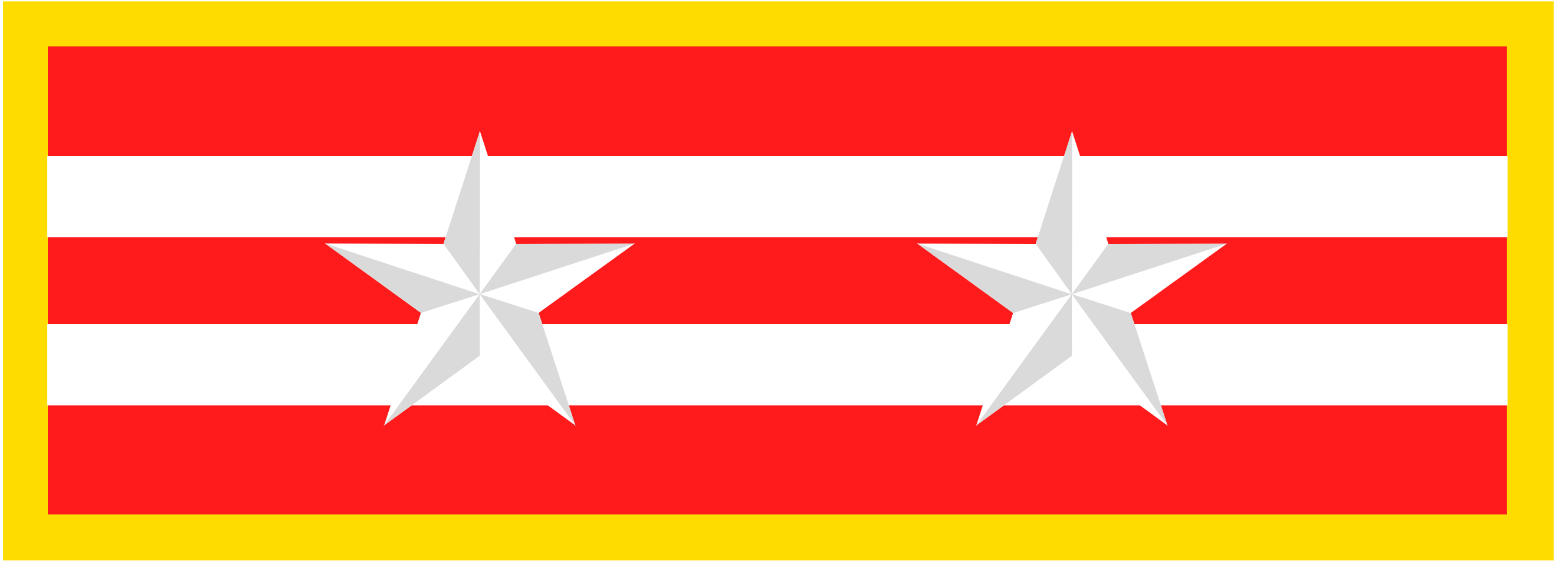
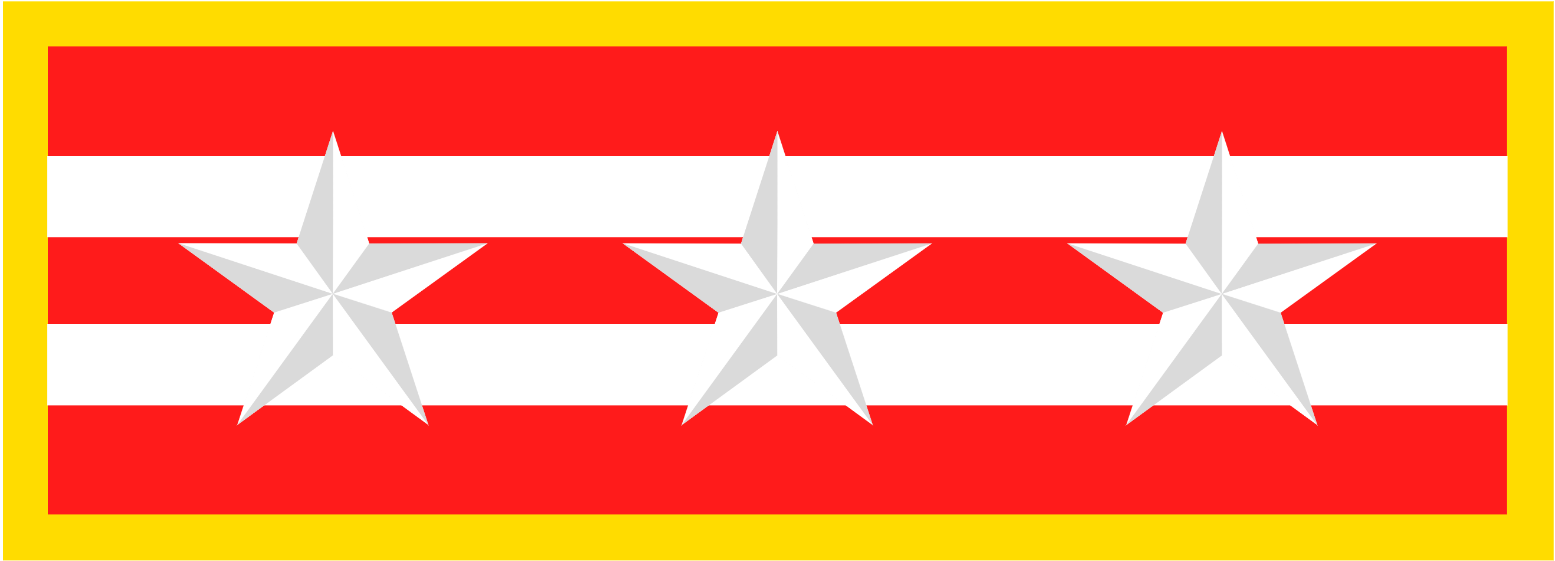
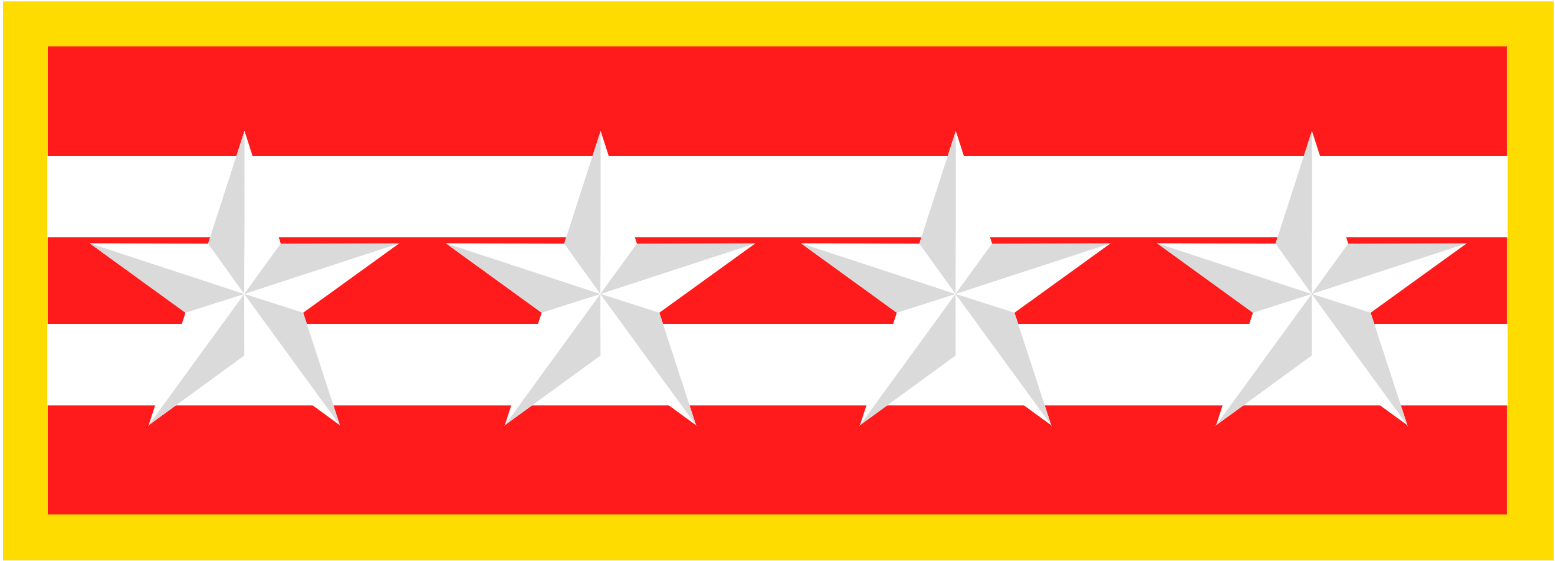
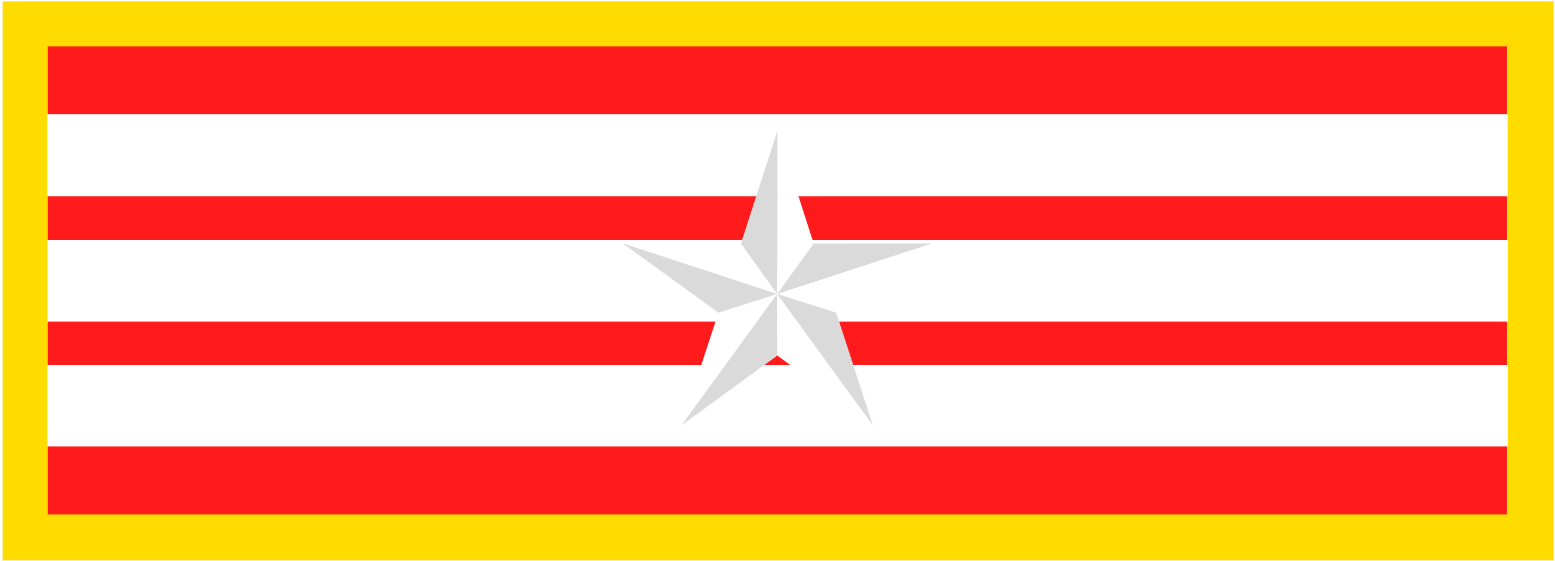
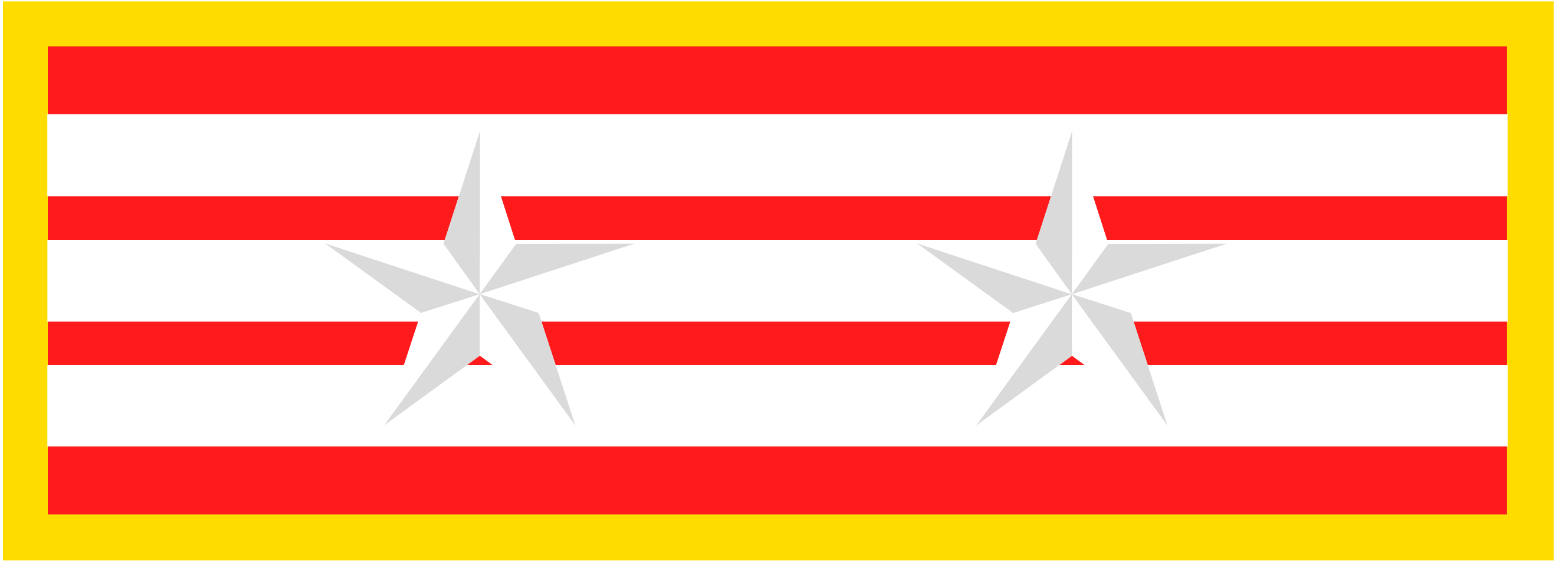
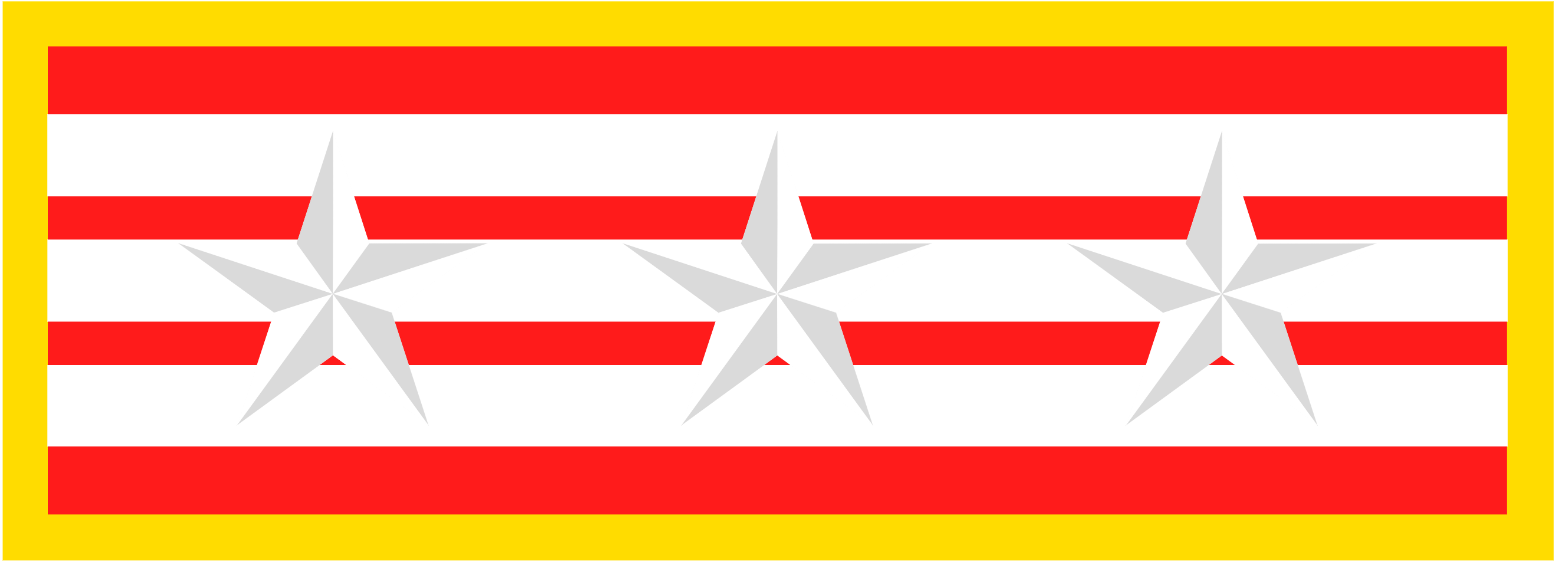
Rank	Insignia
Team member 隊員
Squad leader/Deputy squad leader 小隊長/副小隊長
Deputy Station Head/Station Secretary/Clerk 副分隊長/分隊幹事/書記
Station Head 分隊長
Battalion Consultant 中隊指導員
Deputy Battalion Commander 副中隊長
Division Consultant/Battalion Commander 大隊指導員/中隊長
Deputy Division Commander 副大隊長
Division Commander 大隊長

== See also ==
- Executive Yuan
  - Ministry of the Interior (Taiwan)
  - Ministry of Justice Investigation Bureau
  - Coast Guard Administration (Taiwan)
  - Republic of China Military Police
- Law enforcement agency
