= Amphibious Reconnaissance and Patrol Unit =

Taiwanese military unit

- 海軍陸戰隊兩棲偵搜大隊 (Chinese)
- Active: 1955 - Present
- Country: Taiwan (Taiwan)
- Branch: Republic of China Marine Corps
- Type: Special operations force
- Garrison/HQ: Zuoying Naval Base, Kaohsiung
- Nickname: Frogmen

The Amphibious Reconnaissance and Patrol Unit (ARP) (Chinese: 海軍陸戰隊兩棲偵搜大隊); not to be confused with the other commando frogmen unit within the Republic of China Armed Forces (ROCAF)/(Taiwan); being the 101st Amphibious Reconnaissance Battalion of the Republic of China Army (ROCA), is a special operations force of the Republic of China Marine Corps (ROCMC).

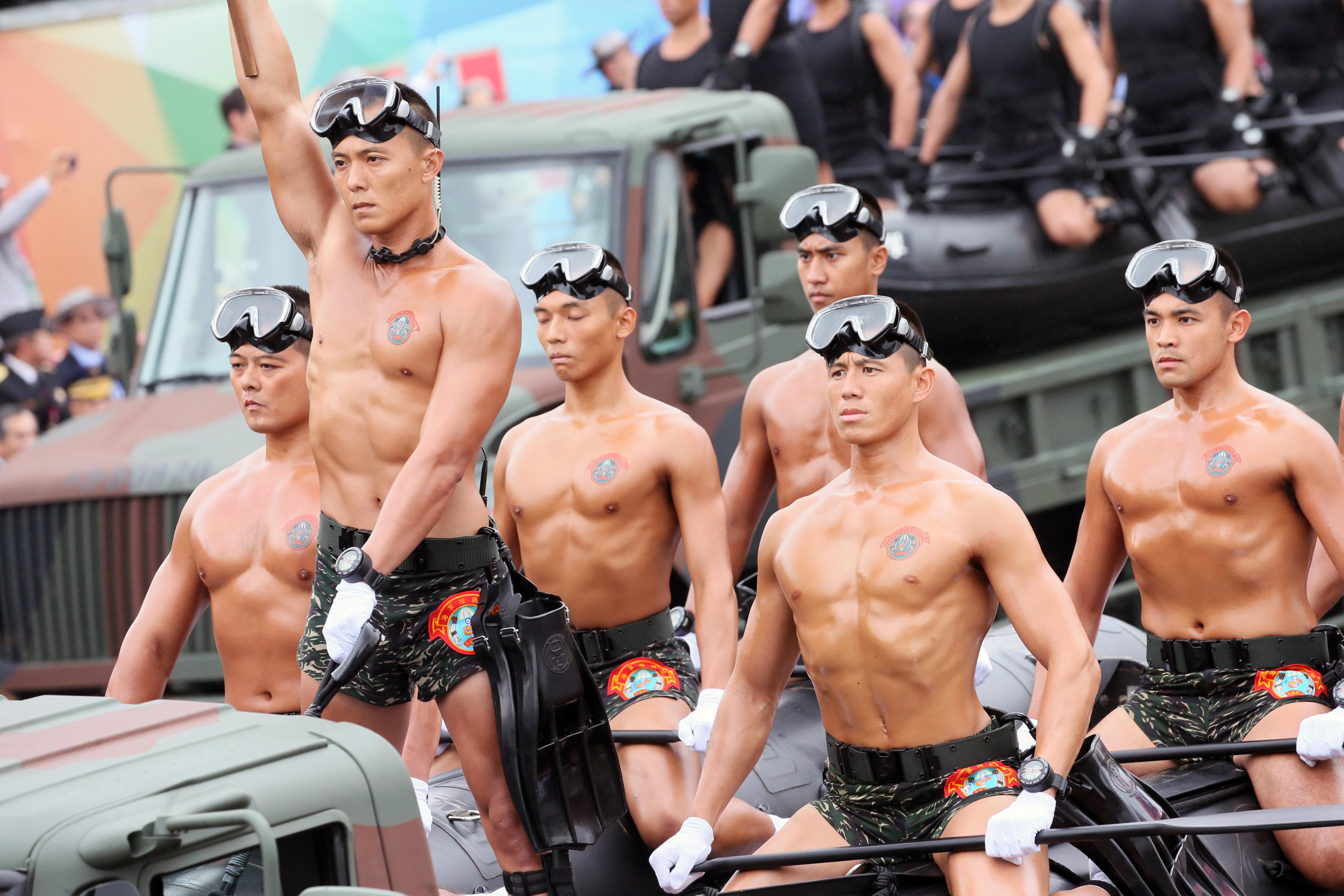
Amphibious Reconnaissance and Patrol Unit members on parade

== Overview ==
ARP members are known as commando frogmen and sharing the same "frogman" moniker they are often compared with the Navy SEALs. However, unlike the Navy SEALs who are under the United States Navy (USN) (and thus, more akin to South Korea's ROKN UDT/SEALs), the ARP are under the ROCMC with each member of the ARP being a ROC marines. Therefore, a more apt comparison for the ARP (with their American counterpart) would be the United States Marine Corps's MARSOC or Marine Raider Regiment (MRR).

The ROC Marine Corps is considered the most selective branch within the ROC Armed Forces and the ARP is the most selective unit within the ROCMC short of the ARP's official special operations unit, the Chinese Marine Corps Special Service Company or CMC.SSC (Chinese: 中華民國海軍陸戰隊特勤隊) known colloquially as The Black (Outfit) Unit (Chinese: 黑衣部隊).

The ARP operates both special reconnaissance and underwater demolition teams. New members of the Coast Guard's Special Task Unit (STU) undergo three months of training with the ARP followed by two months with the Republic of China Military Police Special Services Company (MPSSC).

== History ==
From 1950–1955, the Republic of China Marine Corps Command decided to establish its first marine reconnaissance team, much like the United States Marine Corps Amphibious Reconnaissance Battalion, but whose training for these ROCMC would be modelled after the US Navy's Underwater Demolition Team (UDT). Marines that were selected for the unit were enlisted marines who are Sergeants and below. Training for each class 1 year, and by 1955, the first three classes of marine candidates had passed out of the course, and after that, the unit was self-sufficient in training new marine candidates.

In 2008, the ARP had two female marine candidates pass out of the ARP training program making them the ROC Marine Corps ARP's first female commando frogmen

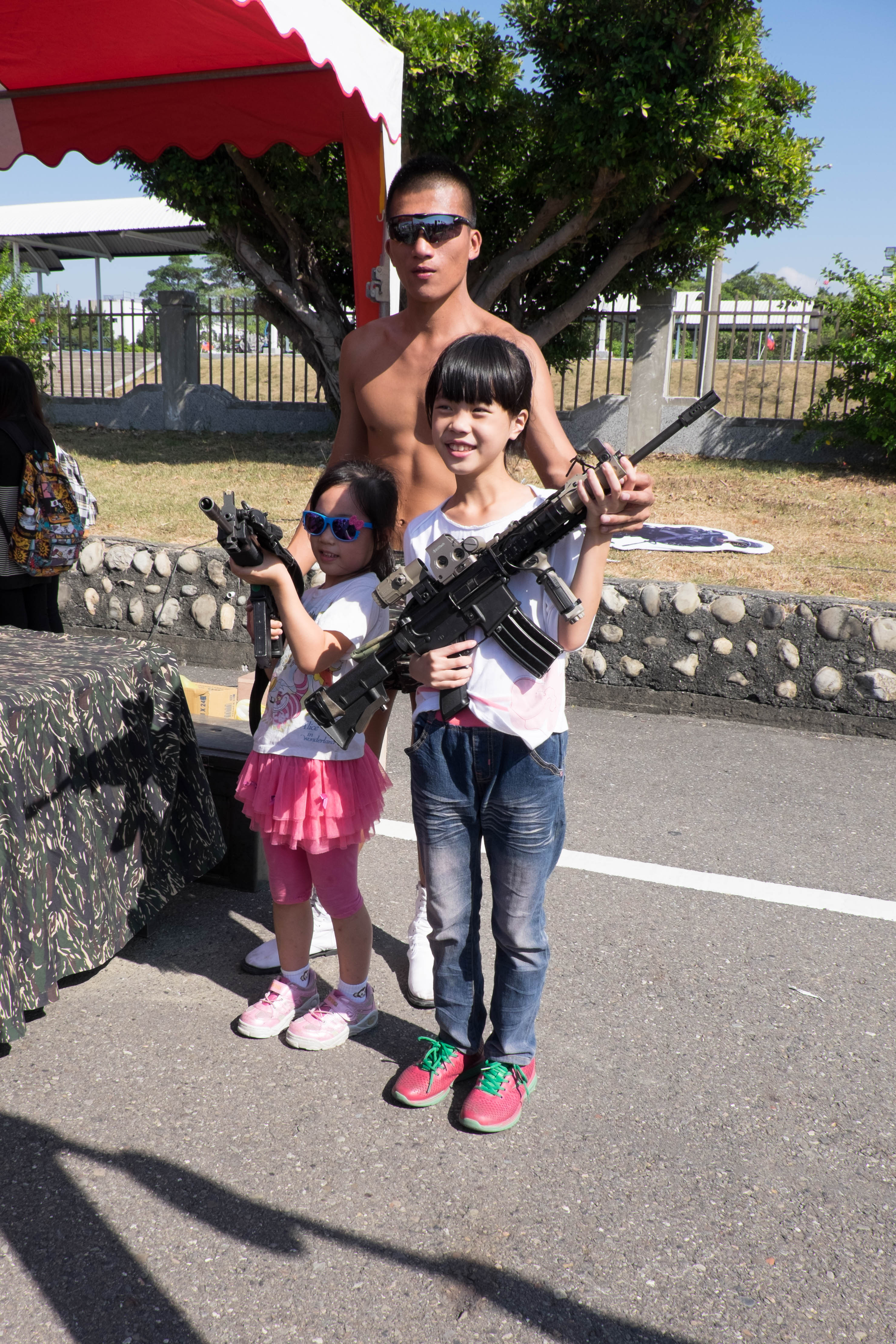
ROCMC Frogman with Children at ROCMC Recruitment Booth

In 2018, the MOD began construction of a NT$134.25 million maritime special operations training base as well as a NT$698.04 million special operations training base slated specifically for ARP use.

== Training ==
Training for the ARP frogman is a 10-week long program, including Hell Week and takes place on the Zuoying Naval Base (海軍左營基地). All candidates to the program are already active duty marines from the ROCMC who volunteered for the program.

As part of the final phase of training right before passing out, all candidates have to undergo the iconic Road to Heaven (天堂路), where candidates have to crawl, do various exercises, and acrobatics along a 164 feet (50 meter) path of coral rocks in a pair of ROCMC issued shorts. While progressing through the coral path, candidates are to follow the instructions of the drill instructor leading the course. Instructors may regularly pour salt water on the candidates while they are progressing along the path to purposely inflict pain on the wounds the candidate may have acquired through crawling on the coral. If the candidate fails to follow instructions or the instructor is not satisfied with the candidate's performance on the path, the instructor has the authority to order the candidate to go back to the beginning of that course and start again. Families of the candidates are allowed to be present to show their support to the candidates. Once the candidate completes the Road to Heaven, they will be officially certified as ARP frogmen.

Generally, training for the ARP has a 48% retention rate among each class of candidates.

== Organization ==
- Chinese Marine Corps Special Service Company; CMC.SSC (Chinese: 中華民國海軍陸戰隊特勤隊); who are the ARP's more secretive Special mission unit (SMU), referred to colloquially as The Black (Uniformed) Unit (Chinese: 黑衣部隊)

== See also ==
- Republic of China Marine Corps
- 101st Amphibious Reconnaissance Battalion
- Airborne Special Service Company
- Republic of China Military Police Special Services Company
- List of military special forces units
- Zuoying Naval Base
