= Special Task Unit =

Taiwanese Coast Guard Unit

- 海巡特勤隊
- CGA STU in 115th National Day Parade
- Country: Republic of China (Taiwan)
- Type: Paramilitary Police Tactical Unit
- Part of: Coast Guard Administration (Taiwan)
- Garrison/HQ: Taipei, Taiwan

The Special Task Unit (STU) is a police tactical unit of the Taiwan Coast Guard Administration (CGA) that specialized in air-sea rescue, apprehension of armed and dangerous criminals, law enforcement for maritime security, maritime counterterrorism and hostage rescue crisis management, tactical special operations, providing security at coast guard bases that are at risk of attack or terrorism, and VBSS operations.

== History ==
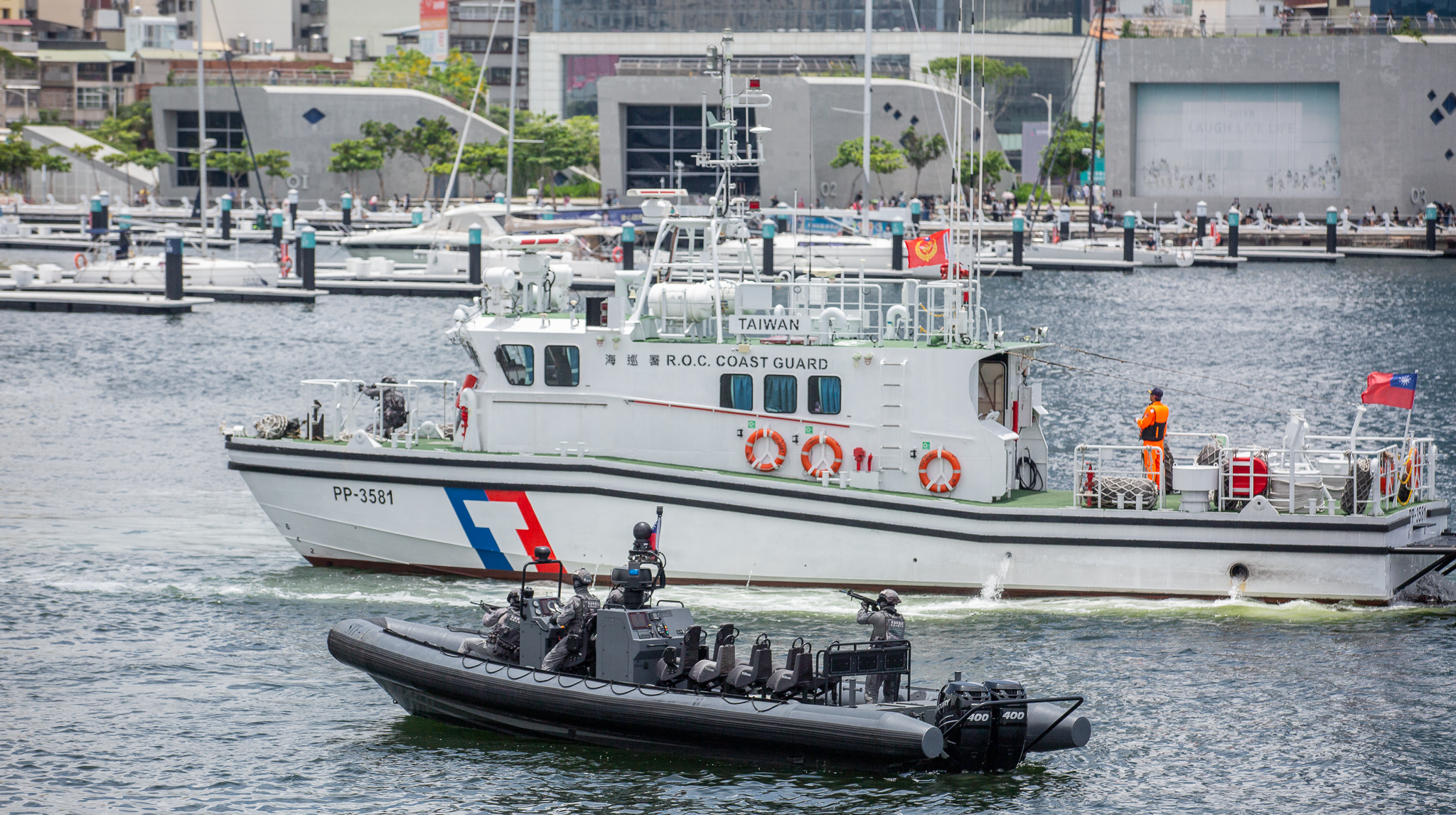
Patrol vessel PP-3581 in 2023 alongside a Special Task Unit K92 assault boat

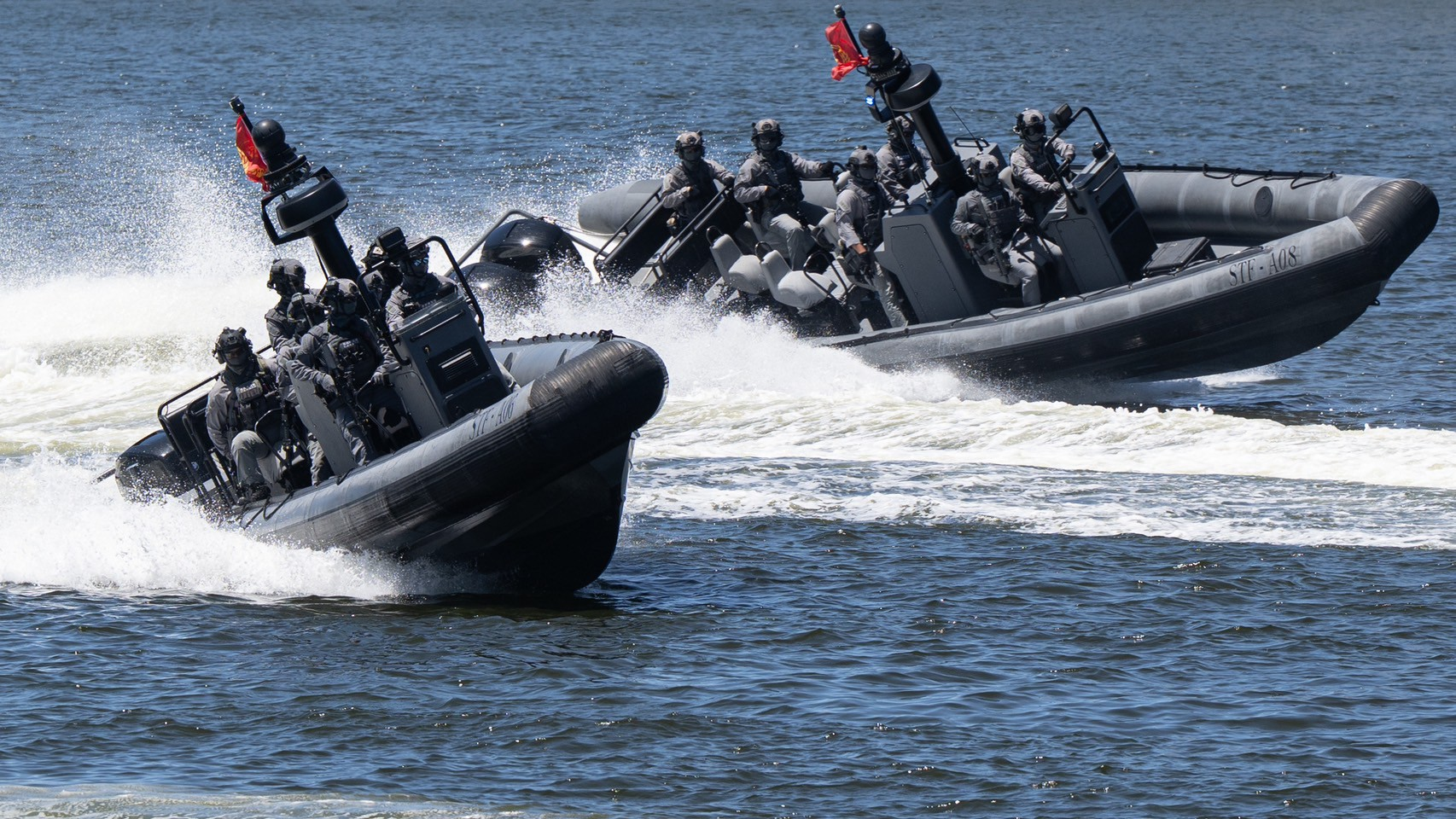
CGA STU members onboard the K92 assault boat

Development of the STU began in 2000 and the unit was officially stood up in 2005 to address concerns about a rise in international terrorism.

During the 36th annual Han Kuang exercises in 2020, the STU participated alongside special forces and special operations forces units from other branches in anti-decapitation drills.

== Training ==
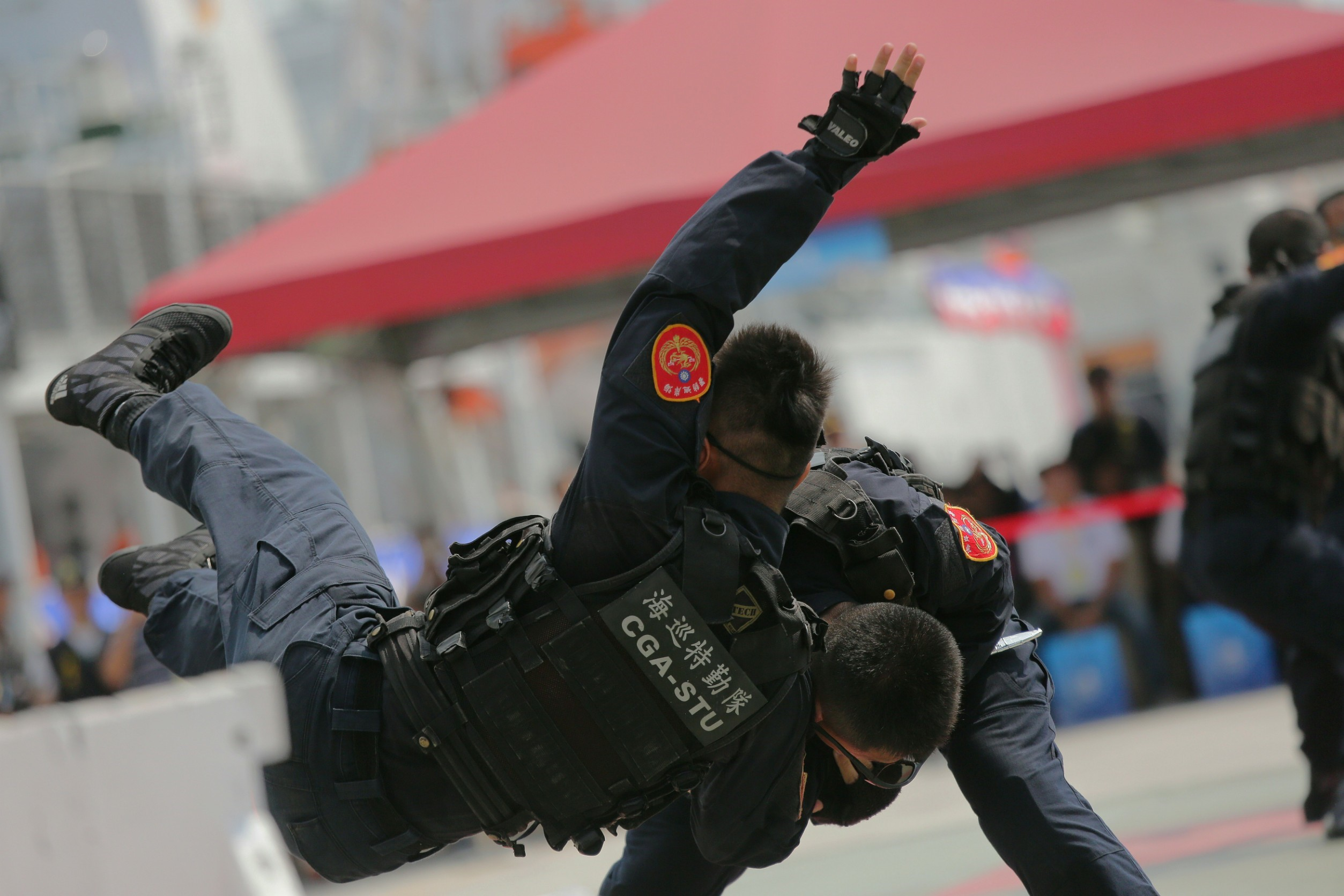
CGA STU 4 demonstrating martial arts

Certifications in amphibious operation tactics, close-quarters battle in tight spaces on various types of boats and ships, coastal patrolling, combat and patrolling in urban areas, counterterrorism and hostage rescue crisis management, defusing and disposal of bombs, fast tactical shooting, hand-to-hand combat, lifeguarding, marksmanship, naval boarding, NBCR on operations in contaminated environments, reconnaissance to intelligence gathering, required knowledge of maritime law, swim instructing, SERE, tactical SCUBA diving, tactical emergency medical, and other related SWAT team tactics are required before even qualifying as a candidate. Candidates must undergo three months training with the Republic of China Marine Corps (ROCMC) Amphibious Reconnaissance and Patrol Unit (ARP) followed by two months training with the Republic of China Military Police Special Services Company (MPSSC).

Training and physical fitness standards are extreme, with a member's daily regimen including 100 pushups in under one minute. All members are proficient in at least two martial arts.

== Organization ==
In 2010, the STU had 52 members distributed across five bases, all of whom were career security forces professionals.

== Equipment ==
=== Individual weapons ===
==== Pistol ====
Model	Origin	Notes
T75 Pistol	ROC	In reserve
GLOCK 17	Austria	Gen 3 and Gen 5
GLOCK 34	Austria	Purchased 1 branch in 2017

==== Submachine Gun ====
Model	Origin	Notes
HK MP5A5	Germany	Currently used as a training gun

==== Shotgun ====
Model	Origin	Notes
Benelli M4 Super 90	Italy	-

==== Assault Rifle ====
Model	Origin	Notes
T65K2	ROC	In reserve
Colt M4	USA	Currently used as a training rifle
HK416	Germany	Only one sample firearm was procured, and the M4 was ultimately selected.
DD MK 18	USA	-
DD5 V3	USA	7.62 x 51mm
SIG MCX Rattler LT	USA	.300 BLK

==== Light Machine Gun ====
Model	Origin	Notes
T75 SAW	ROC	-

==== Sniper Rifle ====
Model	Origin	Notes
HK PSG1	Germany	-

==== Grenade Launcher ====
Model	Origin	Notes
40mm Grenade Launcher	Unknown	Unidentified

Note: Weapon list compiled from official public disclosure.
