= Taiwan Police College =

Police academy in Wenshan, Taipei, Taiwan

- 臺灣警察專科學校
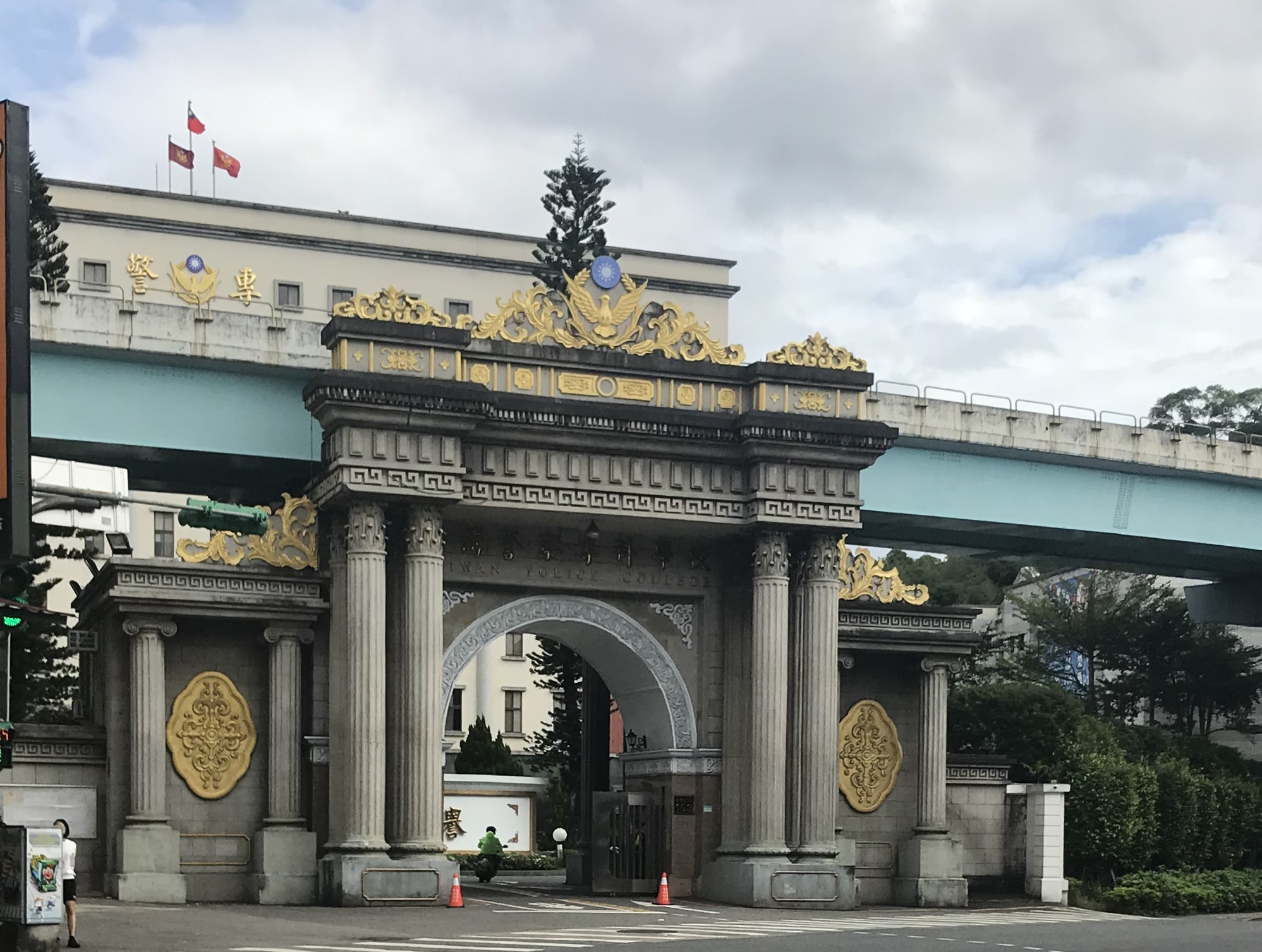
- Established: 1898 (as Japanese colonial policing and prison training school); 27 October 1945 (as Taiwan Provincial Police Training Facilities); 15 June 1988 (as TPC)
- President: Zhong Guo-Wen
- Location: No.153, Sec. 3, Xinglong Rd., Wenshan, Taipei, Taiwan; 24°59′50″N 121°33′26″E
- Website: Official website

Taiwan Police College (TPC; Chinese: 臺灣警察專科學校; pinyin: Táiwān Jǐngchá Zhuānkē Xuéxiào; Pe̍h-ōe-jī: Tâi-oân Kéng-chhat Choan-kho Ha̍k-hāu) is a police academy located within Wenshan District, Taipei, Taiwan. The academy serves as the education center of basic police officers of Taiwan. The institution functions at a junior college level, and is responsible for training police officers.

== History ==
The institute was originally established in 1898, during Japanese colonial rule in Taiwan, as a training institute for police and prison officers.

After Taiwan was returned to the Republic of China on 25 October 1945, it became the Taiwan Provincial Police Training Facilities on 27 October 1945. On 1 April 1948, it was changed to Taiwan Provincial Police Academy. Following the amending and implementation of the Police Education Statute on 9 June 1982, the Taiwan Provincial Police Academy added a junior police college, which enrolled its first students.

On 1 July 1986, it changed name again to Taiwan Police Academy and was placed under the National Police Agency of the Ministry of the Interior. On 16 April 1988, the Legislative Yuan passed the Organizational Statute of Taiwan Police College during the 81st session and on 29 April 1988, law was enacted by the order of the President. The academy was finally renamed Taiwan Police College on 15 June 1988.

In December 1947, the Taiwan Provincial Police Training Facilities enrolled its first female police cadets; 61 women enrolled that year, and 36 in the following year. In 1951, the Female Police Division (女子警察隊) was established in Taipei, with the tasks of disaster relief, local security and working with women. From 1951 to 1955, the academy stopped accepting women because of the lack in ability to perform the tasks. It resumed in 1969 when Taipei became a special municipality.

In 1956, female officers' duties were listed: protecting women and children, household registration, welfare of adopted daughters and sex workers, general security, conducting traffic and women and children-related cases investigation. However, female officers' roles expanded slowly. Taipei's female police force only increased by 10 members from 1956 to 1968.

As of 2020, the institution also planned to rename its Zhongzheng halls, remove two statues of Chiang Kai-shek. TPC used to have a hall named the "Chiang Kai-shek Hall", but it was renamed in May 2021.

== Organizational structure ==
- President
- Vice-president
- Chief Secretary

=== Administrative Units ===
- Academic Affairs Office
- Disciplinary Office
- General Services
- Secretary's Office
- Forensics Laboratory
- Library
- Clinic
- Personnel Office
- Accounting Office
- Information Management Office
- Student Corps

=== Departments ===
- Department of Police Administration
- Department of Criminal Investigation
- Department of Traffic Management
- Department of Fire Safety
- Department of Maritime Patrol
- Department of Technology Crime Investigation
- Center for General Education

== Academics ==
Judo, taekwondo, wrestling, and firearms training are significant parts of the institution's educational programs. The school's directors argue that students must also foster "strong ethical values and mental resilience".

Graduates of the institution must pass the annual police civil service examination, organized annually by the Ministry of Examination (MOEX), before they are allowed to work in government agencies. In 1997, the MOEX opened this examination to applications who have neither graduated from this institution nor the Central Police University to diversify police officers' academic backgrounds; however, recruitment of graduates for both institutions has since decreased. (In 2011, a two-track tiered system was introduced: separate exams are given to those who graduated from TPC or CPU and those who have not, and the number of jobs offered is roughly equal in both groups. TPC and CPU graduates usually pass their own exam's version, but the recruitment rate for the other group is much lower.) TPC offers free tuition for students if they pass this exam within three years of graduation and then serve for at least four years. Furthermore, male graduates are exempt from compulsory military service if they pass this test, but must serve in the military if they do not.

In 2014, TPC opened a facility to teach the liberal arts and humanities.

=== Academic statistics ===
TPC's admission rate is usually less than 15%. In 2013, the academy recruited about 2000 students for its two-year training program, of which more than 60% had already been accepted by or had previously studied at other colleges and universities.

== Notable people ==
- Lee Cheng-han (李承翰), a then-24-year-old graduate recognized for his extraordinary performance, was stabbed with a fruit knife at Chiayi railway station by Cheng (鄭), then 54, in July 2019. Lee was transferred to Chiayi Christian Hospital, where he was pronounced dead at 8:10am on 4 July 2019. The incident occurred after Cheng, who installed and repaired air conditioners, was found on a northbound Ziqiang Express (自強號) train to have boarded the train without a ticket and refused to pay his full fare, and so Lee was sent to help resolve the dispute.
- Jeng Hsing Ping, the institution's assistant head instructor for 25 years, was sworn by his teacher Chang Dong Sheng to never share techniques other than the basics with his students. However, when Chang Dong Sheng died in 1986, Jeng Hsing Ping started training his students in the depths of the art.

== Transportation ==
The university is accessible South East from Wanfang Hospital Station of Taipei Metro.

== See also ==
- List of universities in Taiwan
- National Police Agency (Republic of China)
- Central Police University
