= Republic of China Military Police Special Services Company =

Military unit of Taiwan

- 中華民國憲兵特勤隊
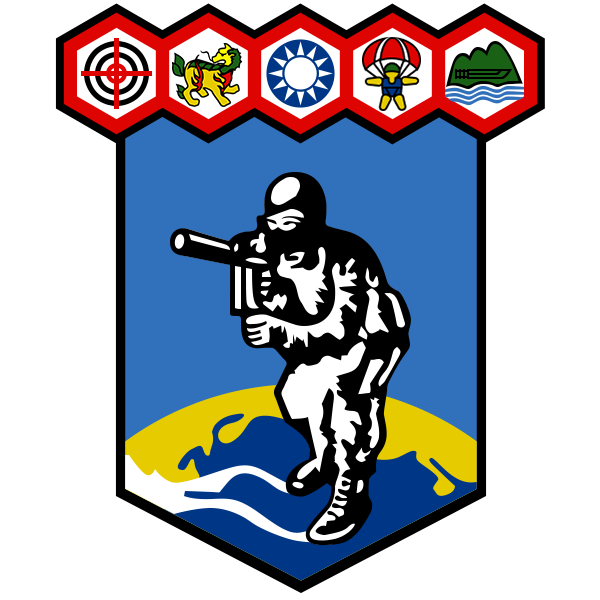
- Emblem of the Military Police Special Services Company
- Founded: 1978
- Country: Republic of China
- Branch: ROC Military Police
- Type: Special forces
- Role: Counter-terrorism; Special reconnaissance Hostage rescue Personnel recovery
- Garrison/HQ: Wugu, Taipei, Taiwan

The Republic of China Military Police Special Services Company (MPSSC; Chinese: 憲兵特勤隊; Code-named: Night Hawks) is a special forces unit of the military police of the Republic of China (Taiwan). It was formed in 1978 and is stationed in Wugu, Taipei. Little is known about this unit, since information regarding it is classified by the Ministry of National Defense.

According to the Taipei Times, the MPSSC has a standing collaboration with United States Army Special Forces, including regular joint exercises. They also have a standing invitation to the Pacific Area Special Operations Conference, hosted annually by Special Operations Command Pacific.

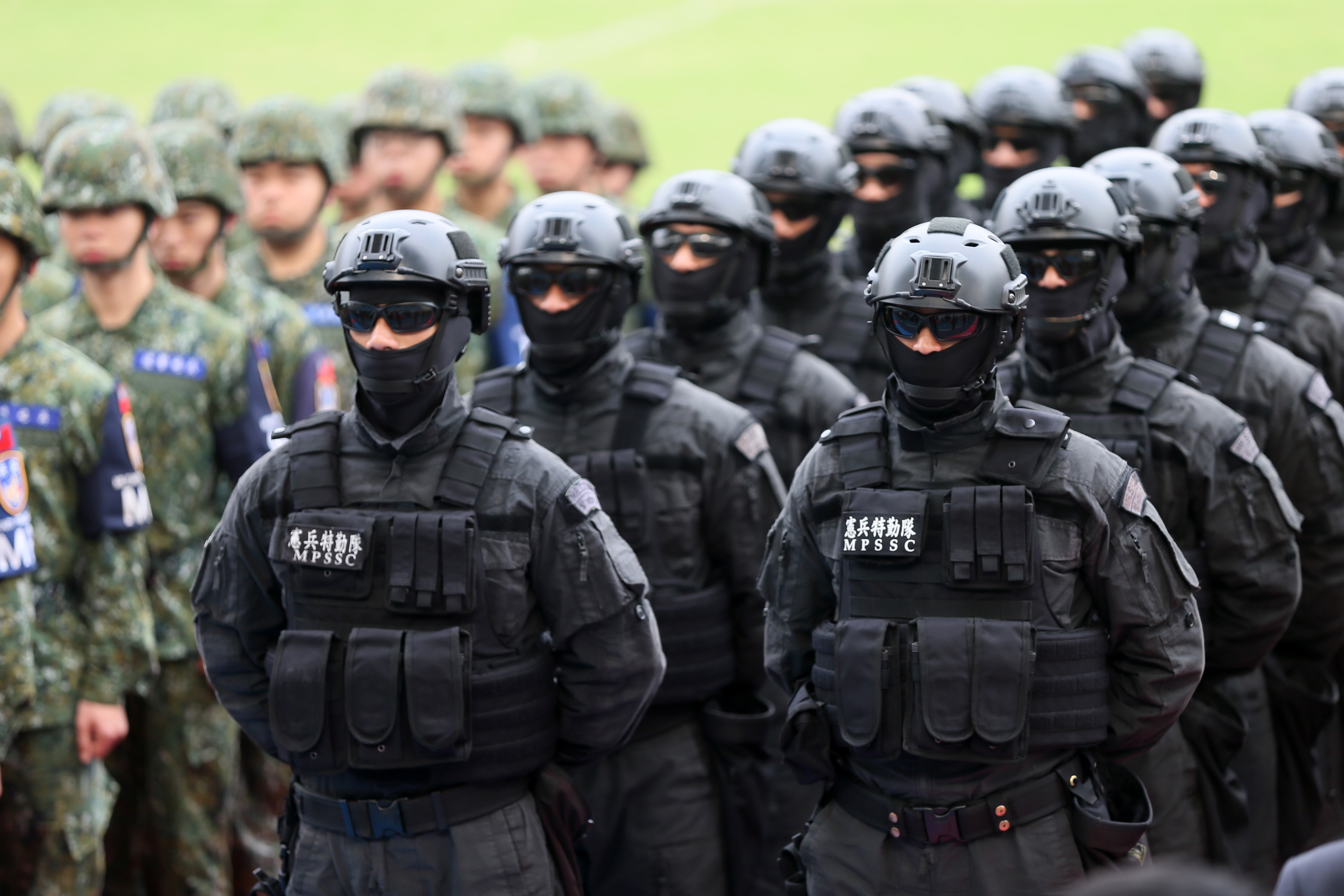
MPSSC appear at Jinhua Counter Terror Exercise and disaster prevention during 2017 Summer Universiade in City of Taipei

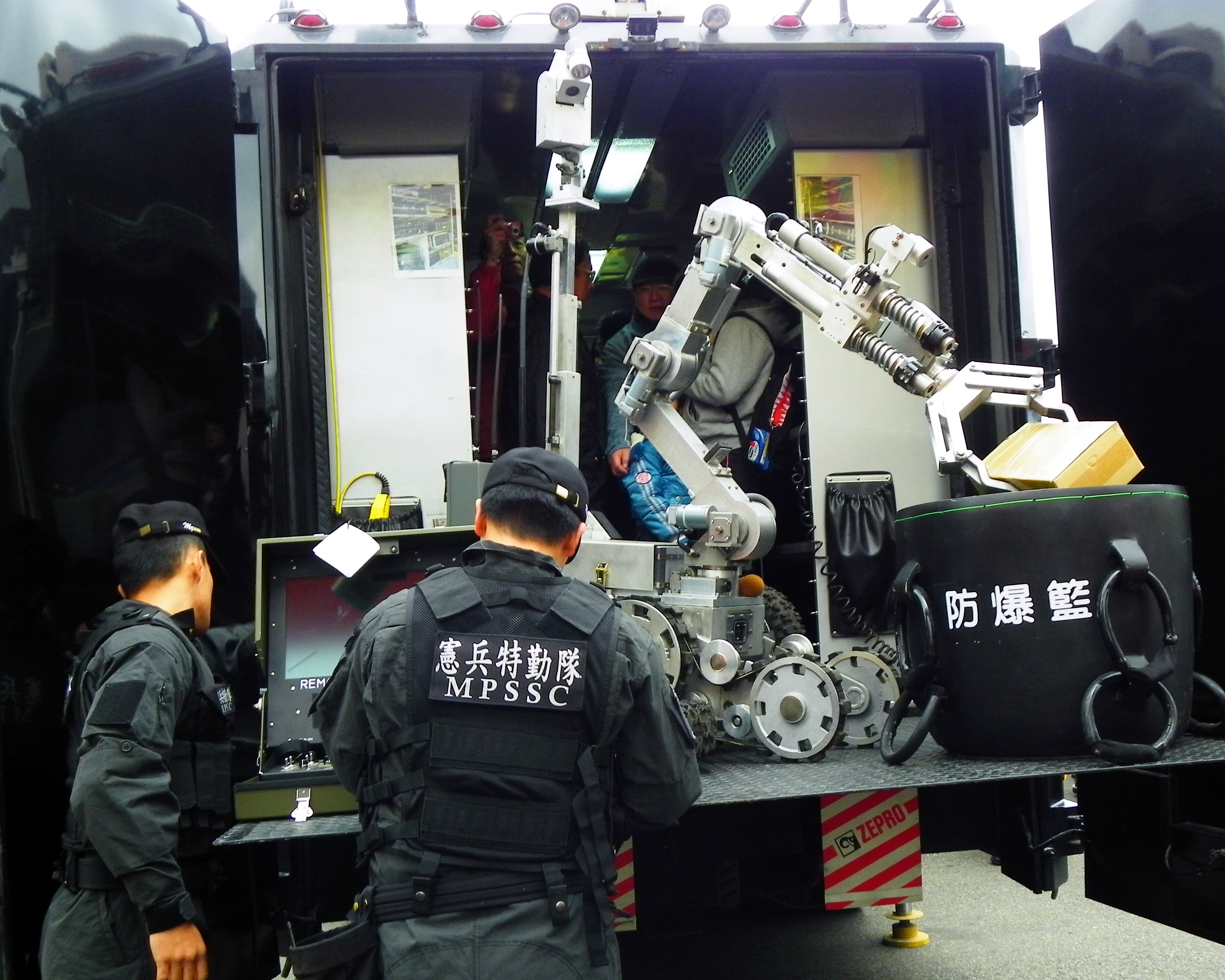
A team of MPSSC operators uses an Anti-Bombing Robot during a training exercise to remove an explosive.

== History ==
Following the 1972 Munich massacre and the success of Operation Entebbe in 1976, the Ministry of National Defense was ordered in December 1977 to begin training and preparation in order to form the MPSSC.

In 2020, it was revealed that the MPSSC was providing counter-terrorism training for the special operations forces of an unnamed Middle Eastern country.

== Training ==
New members of the Coast Guard’s Special Task Unit undergo two months of training with the Special Services Company following three months of training with the Amphibious Reconnaissance and Patrol Unit.

The MPSSC provides training for the various police departments in Taiwan.

== Equipment ==
The MPSSC operates handheld non-projectile anti-drone weapons.

Members of the MPSSC use the Centurion Arms CM4.

== See also ==
- Airborne Special Service Company
- Thunder Squad
