= Thunder Squad =

Police unit of Taiwan

Thunder Squad 霹靂小組 Pīlì Xiǎozǔ
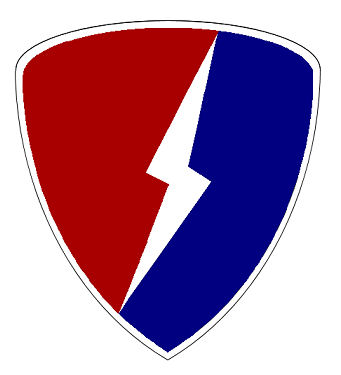
- Arm patch of Thunder Squad

Agency overview
- Formed: 1985
- Employees: 200 personnel

Jurisdictional structure
- Operations jurisdiction: Republic of China (Taiwan)
- General nature: Civilian police
- Specialist jurisdiction: Counter terrorism, special weapons operations; protection of internationally protected persons, other very important persons, or state property

Operational structure
- Parent agency: National Police Agency of the Republic of China (Taiwan)

The Thunder Squad (Chinese: 霹靂小組; pinyin: Pīlì Xiǎozǔ) (TS) are Special Operations Police tactical units within the jurisdiction of various cities in Taiwan.

TS is modeled after the FBI Hostage Rescue Team (HRT) and police SWAT units in the United States. TS is sometimes referred to as a SWAT unit and is also mistaken for the National Police Agency’s Special Operations Group (維安特勤隊) (Note: The SOFRep article mentions the TS is SOG. The latter operates on a national level.).

== History ==
In 1984, Gen. Wego Chiang, Secretary General of the Taiwan National Security Bureau, in conjunction with Wu Bwo Hsiung, Minister of the Interior, issued a National Directive calling for the formation of the national SWAT Command to combat heavily armed criminals and organized crime gangs.

ROC Marine Corps Chief of Staff Lt General Lo Chang became commissioner of the National Police Agency, and established the SWAT Training Headquarters at the First Security Corps special training base under the guidance of the NPA Training Division to select the protocols and training processes. In 1985, American-Chinese Chris Mar was selected as first Chief Instructor. He developed the Comprehensive Applied Close Combat and together with police officer Chen Jia Yur established the CQC Instructors and Demo team to train the National Police Agency SWAT Teams and in the Long-Term Police Instructors Close Combat Courses focusing on unorthodox tactics, Simultaneous close-quarters combat, Arrest and Defend procedure, SWAT Baton, Special Tactics Riot, and Advanced Rescue and Extraction.

In 2020, TS participated in the annual Han Kuang exercise alongside special forces formations from the Military Police and Coast Guard as well as regular military. In 2023, TS was deployed in full force in the MRT in response to bomb threats made.

== See also ==
- NPA SOG
