= List of Taiwanese inventions and discoveries =

This is a list of inventions by people who were born in Taiwan (officially known as Republic of China) or citizens of Republic of China.

== Fashion ==
Gaji bag – Large, open-topped hand bag

== Food, food techniques and cuisine ==
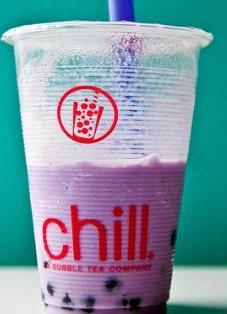
Bubble tea

Bubble tea
is a drink that contains flavored tea and tapioca pearls. It was invented in the early 1980s in Taiwan. Bubble tea vendors serve the beverage cold or hot inside a translucent plastic cup with an oversized straw wide enough for the tapioca bubbles to pass through. The drink has spread from Taiwan and is now popular across the world.
General Tso's chicken
is a sweet deep-fried chicken dish that is served in North American Chinese restaurants. The recipe was invented by Taiwan-based Hunan cuisine chef Peng Chang-kuei.
Instant noodles
were invented by Go Pek-hok, who later adopted the name Momofuku Ando when he immigrated from Taiwan to Japan. Ando created a method for deep-frying and drying noodles that could later be cooked using boiling water. He founded the Nissin Foods company, which in 1971 introduced instant noodles marketed as Cup Noodles that were packaged in Styrofoam cups.
Mongolian barbecue
is a stir fried dish that was developed by Wu Zhaonan in Taiwan in 1951. Meat and vegetables are cooked on large, round, solid iron griddles at temperatures of up to 300 °C (572 °F). Despite its name, the dish is not Mongolian, and is only loosely related to barbecue.
Pineapple cake
is a sweet traditional pastry and dessert containing butter, flour, egg, sugar, and pineapple jam or slices. It likely came into fruition around the 16th century when the pineapple, a fruit native to South America, was introduced by the Portuguese presence in Asia.

== Games and entertainment ==
Connect6
is a game similar to Gomoku invented by I-Chen Wu, a computer science professor at National Chiao Tung University. The player who obtains six or more stones in a row wins.
Cat café
was first opened in Taipei, Taiwan in 1998, which involves a coffee shop with in-house cats that roam freely and interact with customers. The idea since took off and spread around the world.

== Science and technology ==
A universal crossed molecular beam apparatus
for studying chemical reactions was developed by the Taiwanese chemist Yuan T. Lee. In 1986, Lee was awarded the Nobel Prize in Chemistry alongside Dudley R. Herschbach and John Polanyi "for their contributions to the dynamics of chemical elementary processes."
Floating gate transistor
In 1967, Simon Min Sze and Dawon Kahng invented the floating gate transistor, which provides the foundation for many forms of semiconductor memory devices.
Discovering HAART Cocktail Therapy
David Ho is a Taiwanese-American medical doctor and HIV/AIDS researcher who was born in Taiwan and has made many innovative state of the art scientific contributions to the understanding and technological treatment of HIV infection.
The integrated laptop projector
was first developed and showcased by Asus, a Taiwanese computer manufacturer, in 2008. The built-in projector debuted at Computex Taipei 2008, an annual computer expo. Competitors such as HP in 2010 and Fujitsu in 2011 have since released similar products.
Refinement of Charged Meltblown Filtration
Certain charged filtration media manufacturing processes used in modern respirators were invented by Peter Tsai.
The optimistic concurrency control
method was first proposed by Taiwanese computer scientist H. T. Kung and American John T. Robinson in 1981.
Pop a Point Pencil
a stackable pencil or non-sharpening pencil. It is a type of pencil where many short pencil tips are housed in a cartridge-style plastic holder. A blunt tip is removed by pulling it from the writing end of the body and re-inserting it into the open-ended bottom of the body, thereby pushing a new tip to the top. It is pioneered by Taiwanese stationery manufacturer Bensia Pioneer Industrial Corporation in the early 1970s.

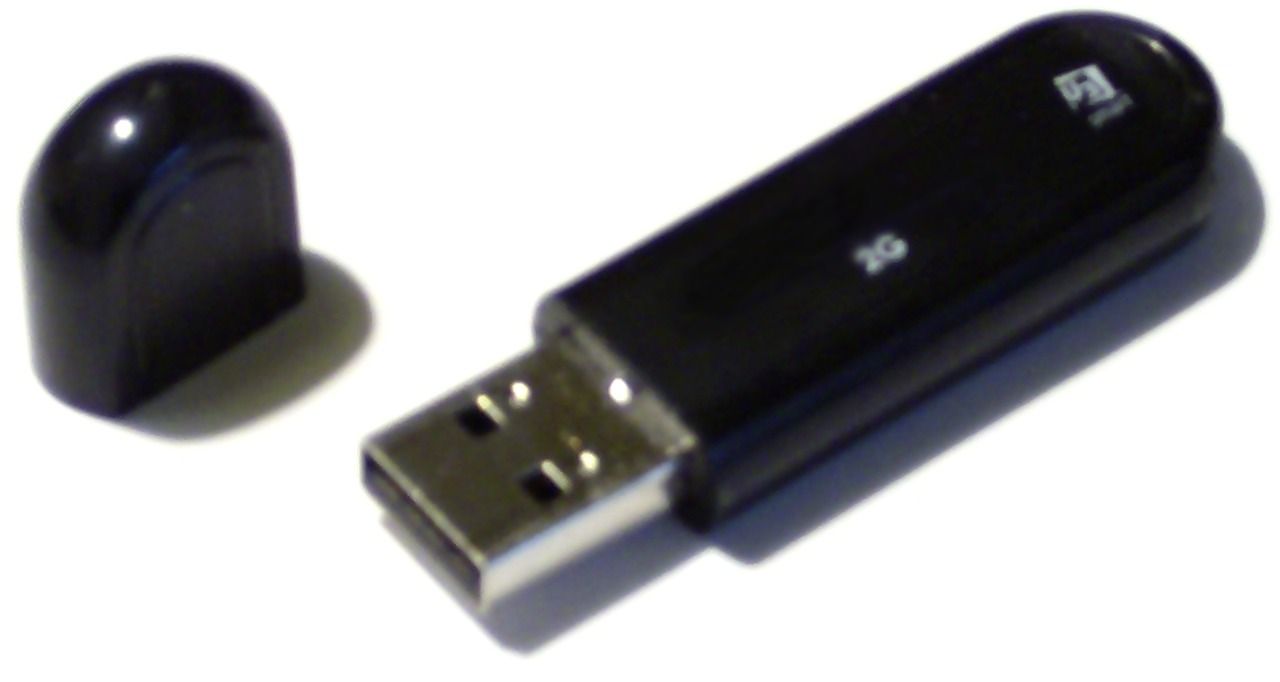
USB flash drive

USB flash drive
a data storage device, invented by Pua Khein-Seng, a Taiwanese-Malaysian inventor.
Xiaoluren
the walking green man, is the animated traffic light system.
High entropy alloys
invented in 2004 by Jien-Wei Yeh and his team in Taiwan.
WiMAX
a wireless broadband communication standards invented by Tatung Company accompanied with Tatung University.

== Language and writing system ==
Taiwan Sign Language
is the sign language most commonly used by the deaf and hard of hearing in Taiwan.
Taiwanese Braille
is the braille script used in Taiwan for Taiwanese Mandarin (Guoyu).

== Sports ==
Woodball
is a sport invented by Weng Ming-hui and Kuang-chu Young in 1990. In the game, a mallet is used to pass a ball through a series of gates. The Olympic Council of Asia made the sport a program of the Asian Beach Games in 2008. The International Woodball Federation is based in Taipei, Taiwan.

== Weapons and military ==
=== Assault rifle ===
- T112 assault rifle
- T91 assault rifle
- T86 assault rifle
- T65 assault rifle

=== Sniper rifle ===
- T93 sniper rifle

=== Submachine gun ===
- Type 77 submachine gun

=== Machine gun ===
- T74 Machine Gun
- T75 Light machine gun

=== Pistol ===
- T75 pistol

=== Grenade launcher ===
- Kestrel

=== Others ===
- XTR-101/102
- CS/MPQ-90 Bee Eye

== See also ==
- History of typography in East Asia
- List of Chinese discoveries
- List of Chinese inventions
- List of Japanese inventions and discoveries
- List of Korean inventions and discoveries
