= Defense industry of Taiwan =

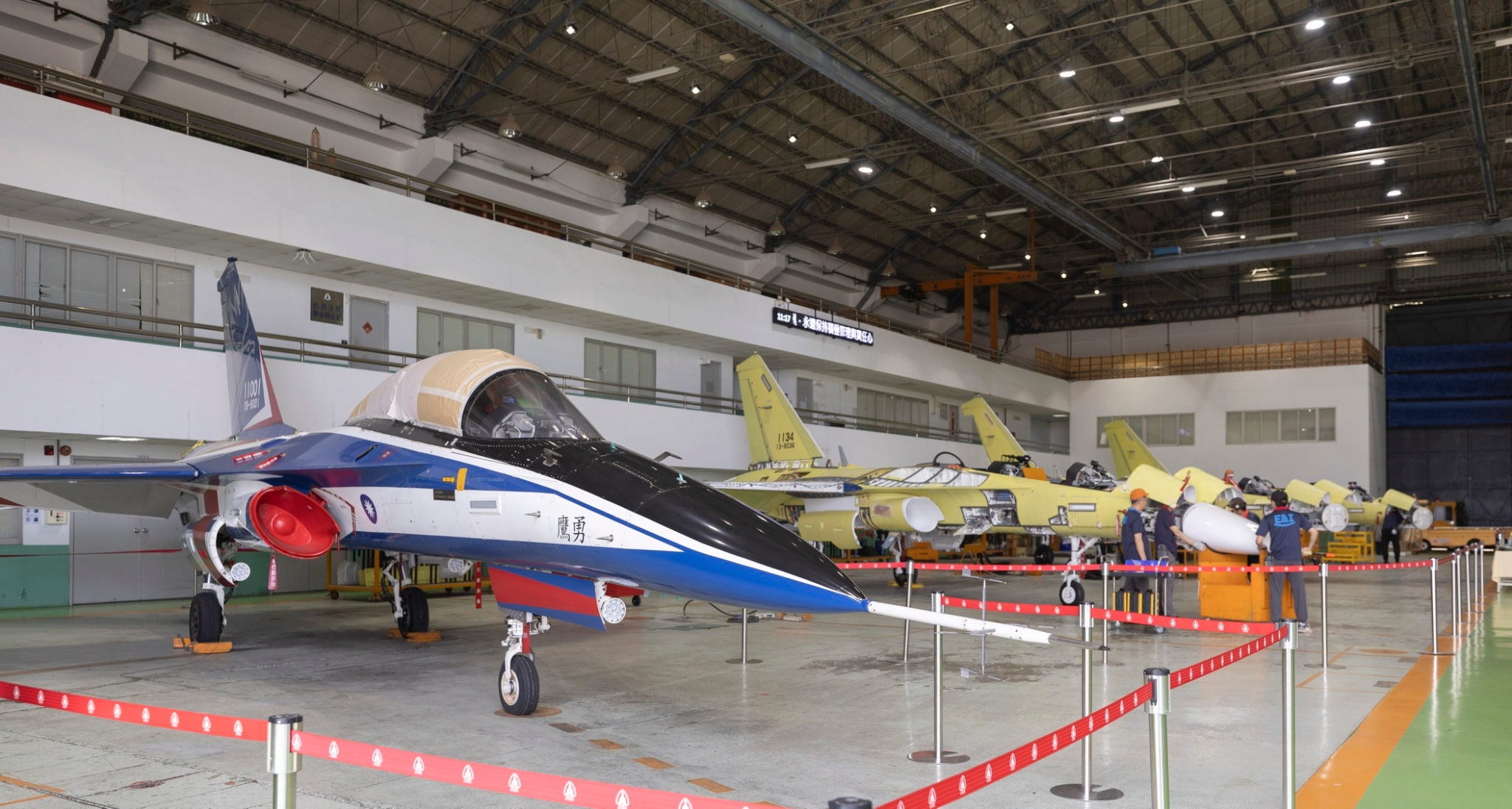
AIDC T-5 Brave Eagle production

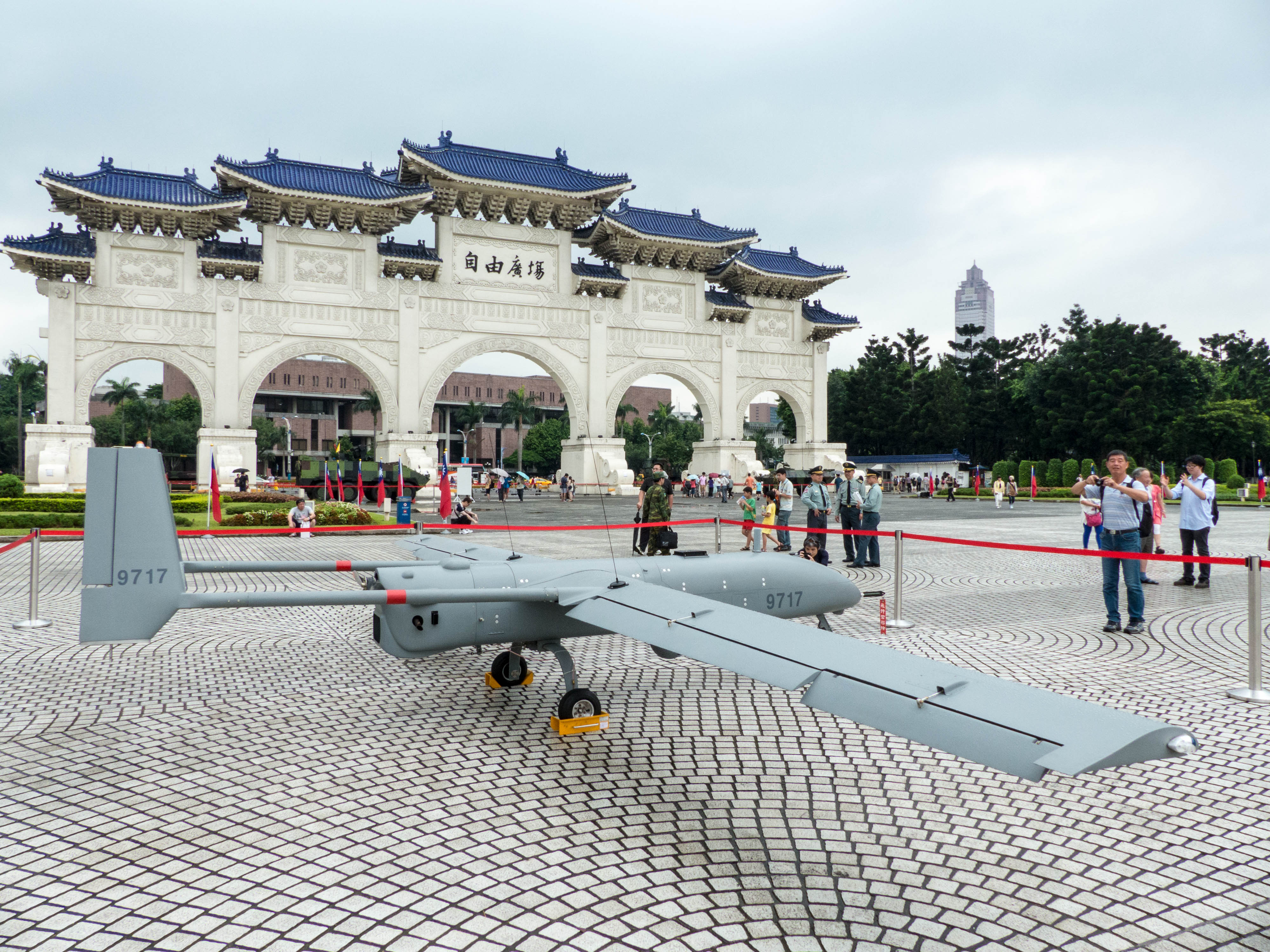
NCSIST Albatross 9717 on display at CKS Memorial Hall

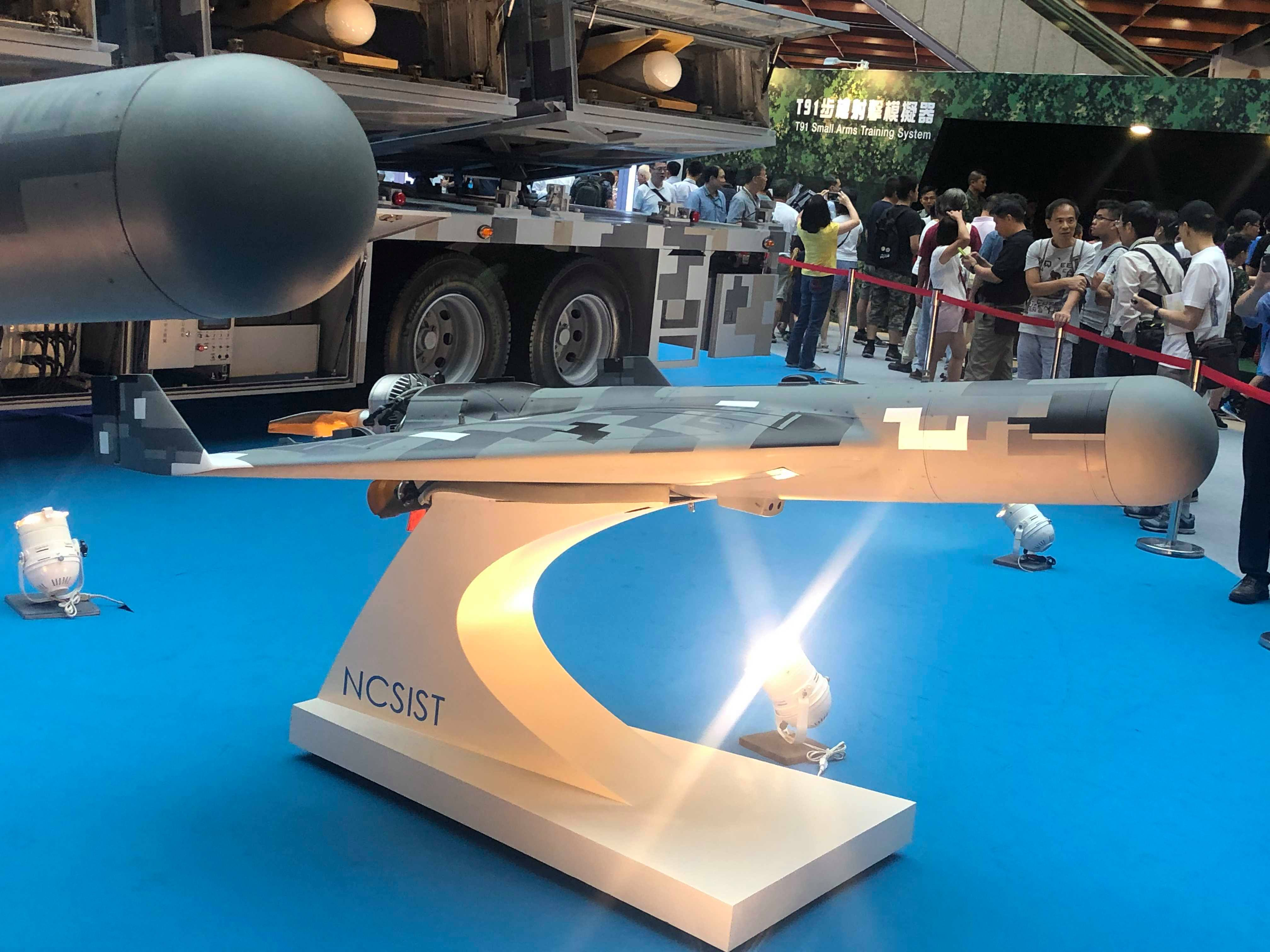
Chien Hsiang Loitering munition designed by NCSIST

The defense industry of Taiwan is a strategically important sector and a significant employer. They primarily supply weapons and platforms to the Republic of China Armed Forces with few major weapons systems exported abroad. Taiwanese defense industry has produced fighter aircraft, missile systems, surface ships, radars, rocket artillery, armored vehicles, and small arms.

== History ==
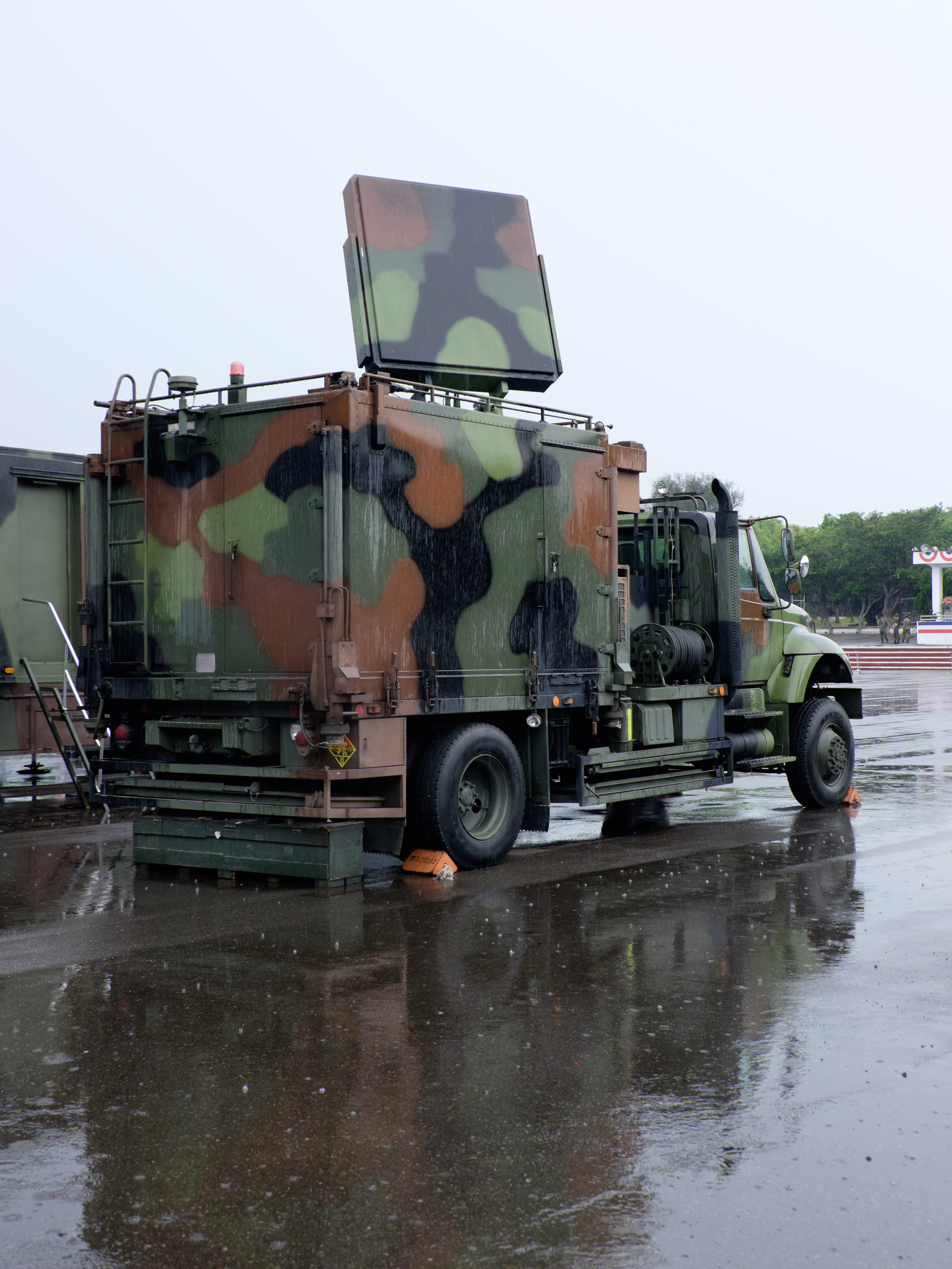
ROCA CS/MPQ-90 Bee Eye, manufactured by NCSIST, in 2015

=== Before World War 2 ===
From 1825 until 1866 a shipyard in Tainan produced warships for the Qing navy. Logging for warship production was one of the impetus for the Qing's colonial expansion into Taiwan's mountainous interior.

During the Japanese colonial period a chemical weapons factory was in operation in North Taiwan; the Nationalists took possession of this facility following the conclusion of World War II and are believed to have expanded the facility. Taiwan no longer has a chemical weapons industry.

=== After World War 2 ===
A nuclear weapons program operated during the Cold War but was shut down due to American pressure, however the investments made during the program helped advance Taiwan's defense industry. The Sky Horse ballistic missile system was developed in the late 1970s and early 1980s before a combination of pressure from American President Ronald Reagan and internal competition from anti-ballistic missile development programs ended the program in 1982.

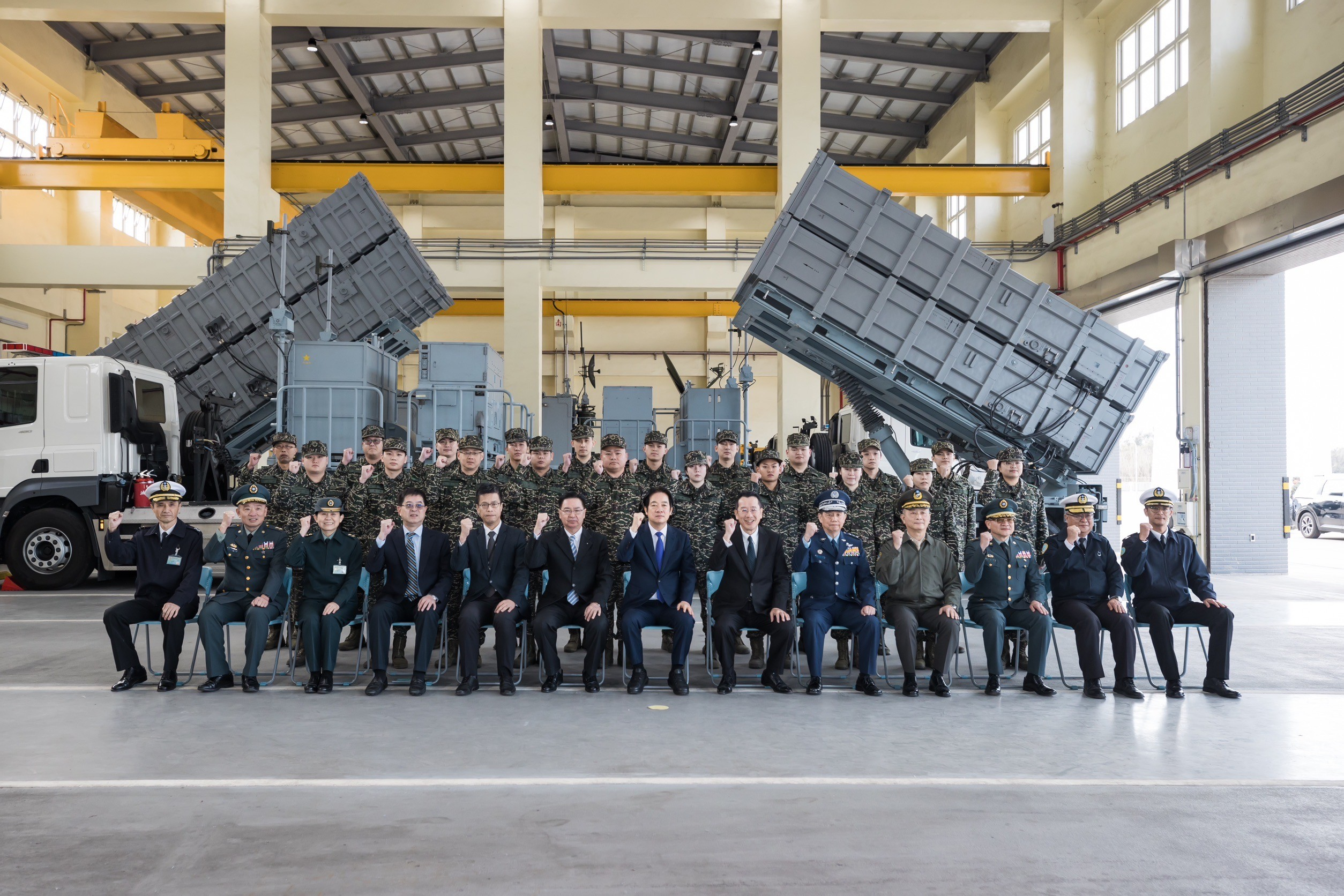
HF-3 transporter erector launchers and President Lai Ching-te in 2025

The defense sector was invigorated following the recognition of the PRC by the United States in 1979 and the subsequent uncertainty this injected into the US-Taiwan relationship. The KMT government aimed to eventually achieve full self sufficiency in weapons systems. During that period, Taiwan made the IDF fighter in which is playing the role of rapid response towards PLA fighters approaching.

=== 21st century ===
In 2014 the Aerospace Industrial Development Corporation was privatized with the government retaining a 39% stake and the National Chung-Shan Institute of Science and Technology was made an administrative corporation of the government rather than a constituent of the Armaments Bureau.

Under DPP President Tsai Ing-wen, there was a renewed focus on indigenous manufacturing, particularly of air and naval defense. President Tsai has also increased the military budget.

Taiwan's defense industry has seen significant growth, aligning with the ruling party's goals set in 2014 to revitalize domestic weapons production. Recent milestones include the unveiling of a fighter jet trainer prototype and the initiation of Taiwan's first homegrown submarine project. These developments not only contribute to Taiwan's economy but also enhance its self-defense capabilities. The government has matched military needs with local companies' capabilities and has steadily increased the defense budget, with 2020 marking a record high.

In 2021 Ministry of National Defense launched an initiative to recruit foreign workers to permanent jobs in Taiwan to address local talent shortages. The initiative also aims to address disruption stemming from the churn of contracted foreign technicians and advisors.

In 2022, 800 combat drones manufactured by DronesVision were transferred to Ukraine through Poland for use during the Russian invasion of Ukraine.

Taiwanese company JC Tech has created a "Taiwanese Switchblade" suicide drone called the Flyingfish. After a while, NCSIST also demonstrated a loitering munition made indigenously. Following the widespread use of drones in the Russian invasion of Ukraine, the official drone development program was expanded to include non-state owned companies as prime contractors for the first time. The government views drones as a destabilizing technology whose adoption would allow Taiwan to asymmetrically counter the threat from the PLA. The government has designated both drone and drone component manufacturing as strategic industrial focuses. In 2023 Taiwanese drone component manufacturing self sufficiency stood at 70-80%.

Missile production is extensive with annual production surpassing 1,000 units in 2023, this included the Wan Chien, HF-2E, and HF-3 among others. The government and private manufacturers have been eying the global market as a way to build enough scale in the drone industry to effectively compete with China.

In July 2025 China placed a number of Taiwanese defense companies on an export control list due to their work for the Taiwanese military. The move was largely symbolic and part of a wider Chinese push to limit Taiwan's defense industry.

== Manufacturers ==
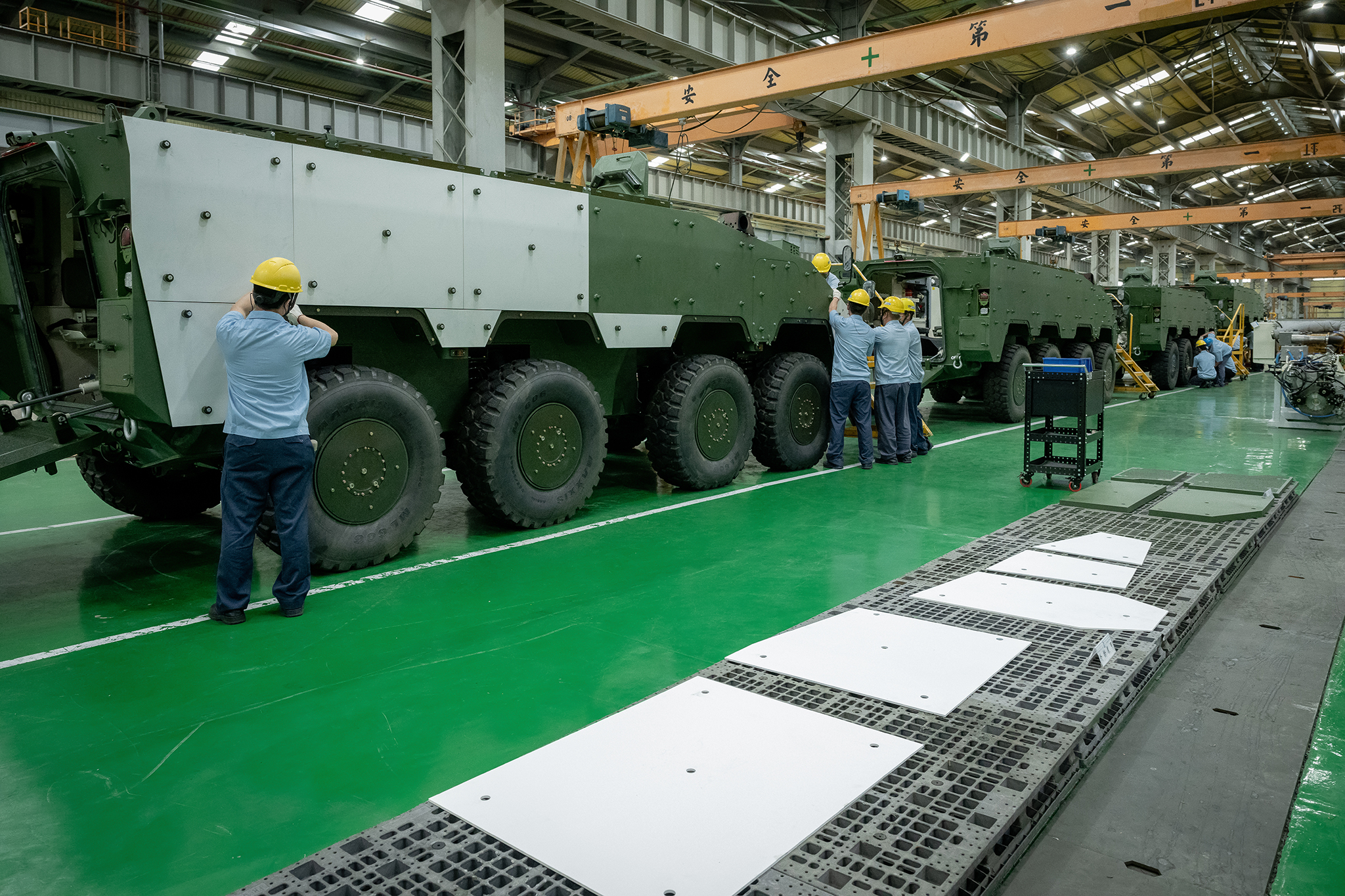
CM-32 armoured vehicle assembly line at the Ordnance Readiness Development Center

The National Chung-Shan Institute of Science and Technology, the Armaments Bureau, and the Aerospace Industrial Development Corporation are the only three Taiwanese defense manufacturing firms with the capabilities of a full defense prime. For naval systems there are three major shipbuilders and more than a half dozen active shipyards. In addition to the big defense firms there are more than 200 small and medium businesses involved in the defense industry. As the Taiwanese military budget increases many Taiwanese firms which did not formerly make defense products have explored the market, interest was particularly piqued following the Russian invasion of Ukraine. Following the Russian invasion of Ukraine the Taiwanese military bought significant quantities of civilian grade drones including from Taiwan UAV, Taiwan's oldest private drone manufacturer.

=== Land vehicles ===
Taiwan's domestic vehicle industry supplies the ROC Army with armored personnel transport and some light vehicles. Famous examples include the CM-12 tank, CM-21 armored vehicle, and CM-32 armoured vehicle.

=== Aviation industry ===
Provide aircraft and fighter jets to the Republic of China Air Force. Famous examples include the AIDC F-CK-1 Ching-kuo, AIDC T-5 Brave Eagle, AIDC AT-3, and F-5E/F Chung Cheng.

=== Maritime industry ===
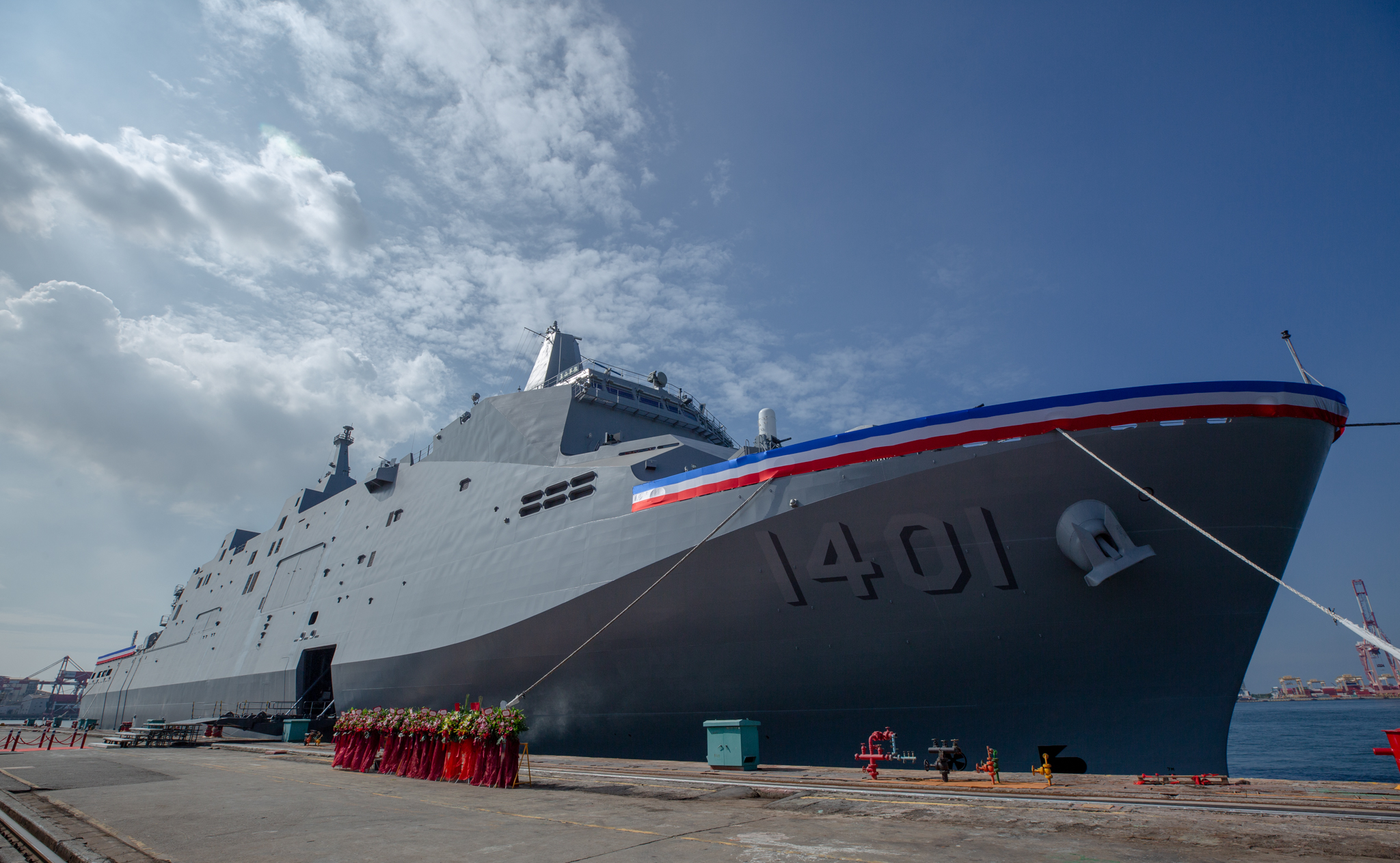
Yushan-class landing platform dock produced by CSBC Corporation, Taiwan

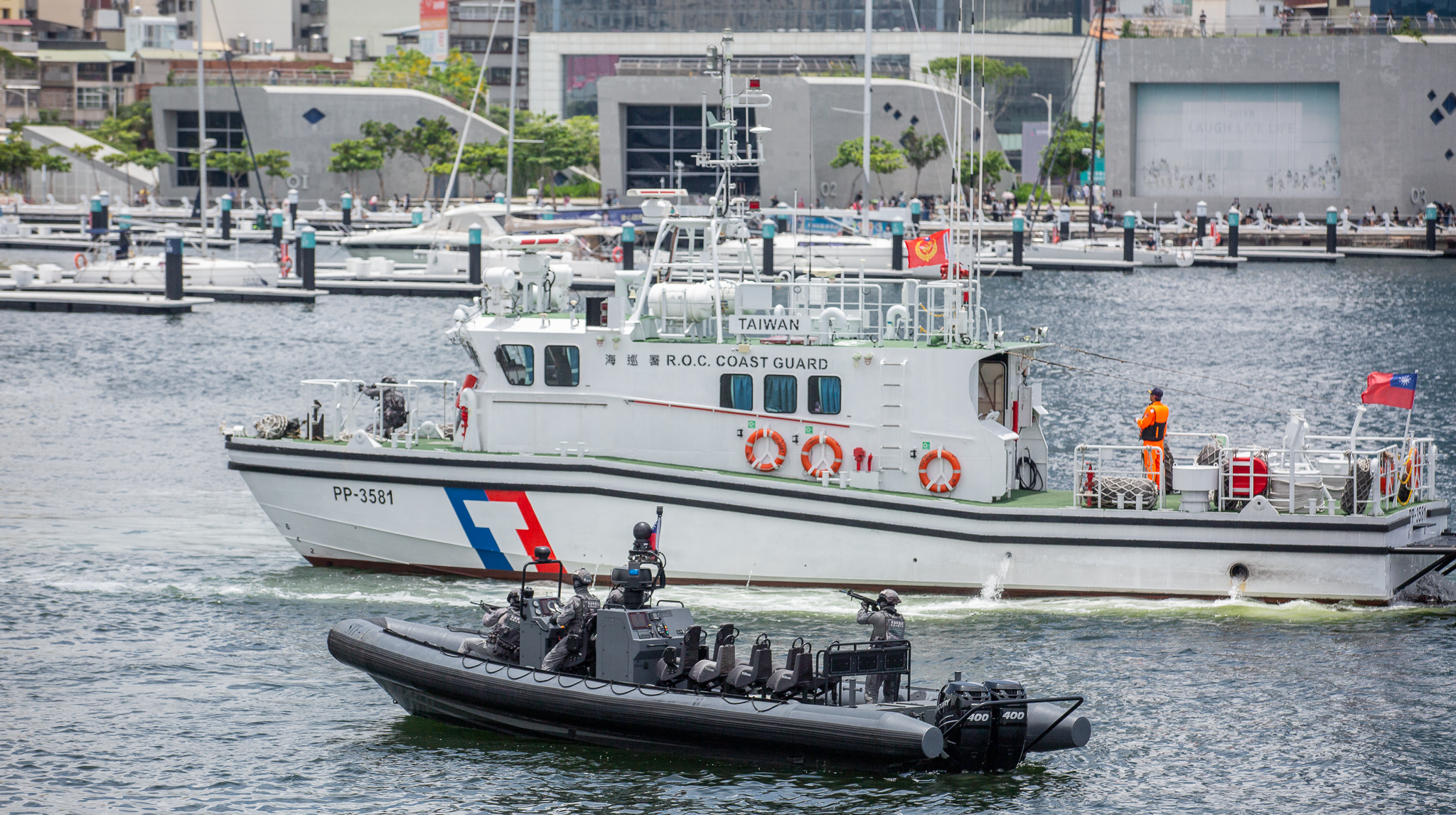
M109 assault boat alongside a Coast Guard Administration patrol boat

The major shipbuilders, CSBC Corporation, Taiwan, Jong Shyn Shipbuilding Company, and Lungteh Shipbuilding, all build military and coast guard vessels. Military and Coast Guard orders make up a large portion of shipbuilders books by dollar value. Between the Taiwanese Navy and the Coast Guard Administration Taiwan spends approximately a billion dollars a year on new vessel construction.

The vessels are usually constructed by the shipyards and weapon installation done by NCSIST afterwards. Famous examples include Tuo Chiang-class corvette, Panshih-class fast combat support ship, and Yushan-class landing platform dock. Moreover, Taiwan is building on the Hai Kun-class submarine to create a fleet of new diesel attack submarines. Domestically produced minelayers were inducted into service in 2022.

Karmin International has supplied boats to the Taiwanese Navy and Coast Guard, as well as export customers, including the Republic of the Marshall Islands, Palau, Nauru, and Tuvalu.

A number of Taiwanese companies are engaged in the development of uncrewed surface vehicles. Taiwanese uncrewed surface vehicle manufacturers include NCSIST, Thunder Tiger, CSBC Corporation Taiwan, Carbon-based Technology, Lungteh Shipbuilding, and Corum International.

== Law and regulation ==
In 2019 the Legislative Yuan passed the National Defense Industry Development Act which among other things instructed the Ministry of National Defense to evaluate prospective defense companies and rank them in three tiers based on their technological capability, the size of their operations and their experience in researching, developing, manufacturing and maintaining military equipment, as well as their track record working with academia, businesses or foreign companies.

Later in 2019 the Legislative Yuan passed a bill which encourages foreign direct investment in the defense industry and other ”strategic” industries. The bill allows foreign investors in these sectors to claim "special tax rates" and also tax rebates of up to half their tax bill.

The Taiwanese government restricts the export of dual use items to certain countries. In 2023 Taiwan placed additional restrictions on machine tool exports to Russia and Belarus in response to reports that certain Taiwanese machine tool manufacturers were playing a key part in Russia's war effort.

== Exports ==
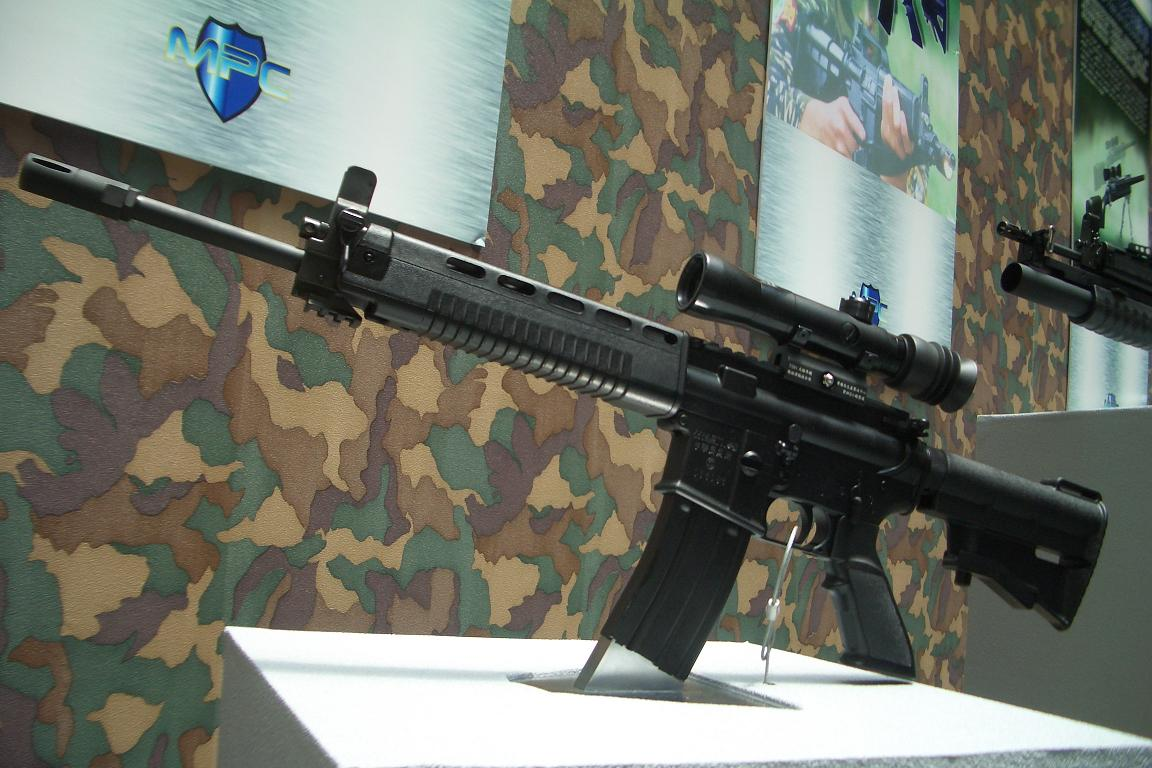
T91 assault rifle manufactured by the 205th Arsenal

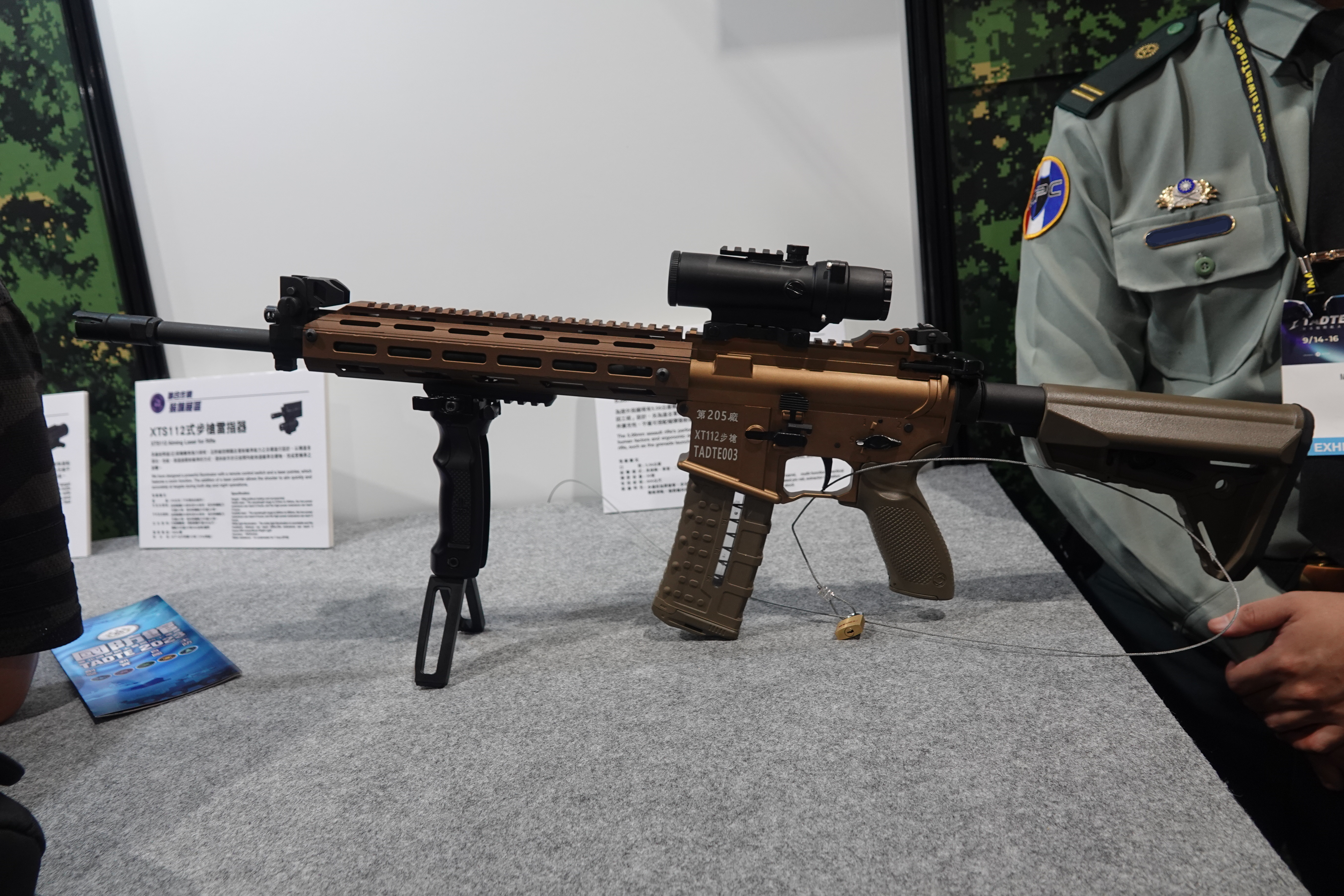
T112 assault rifle manufactured by the 205th Arsenal

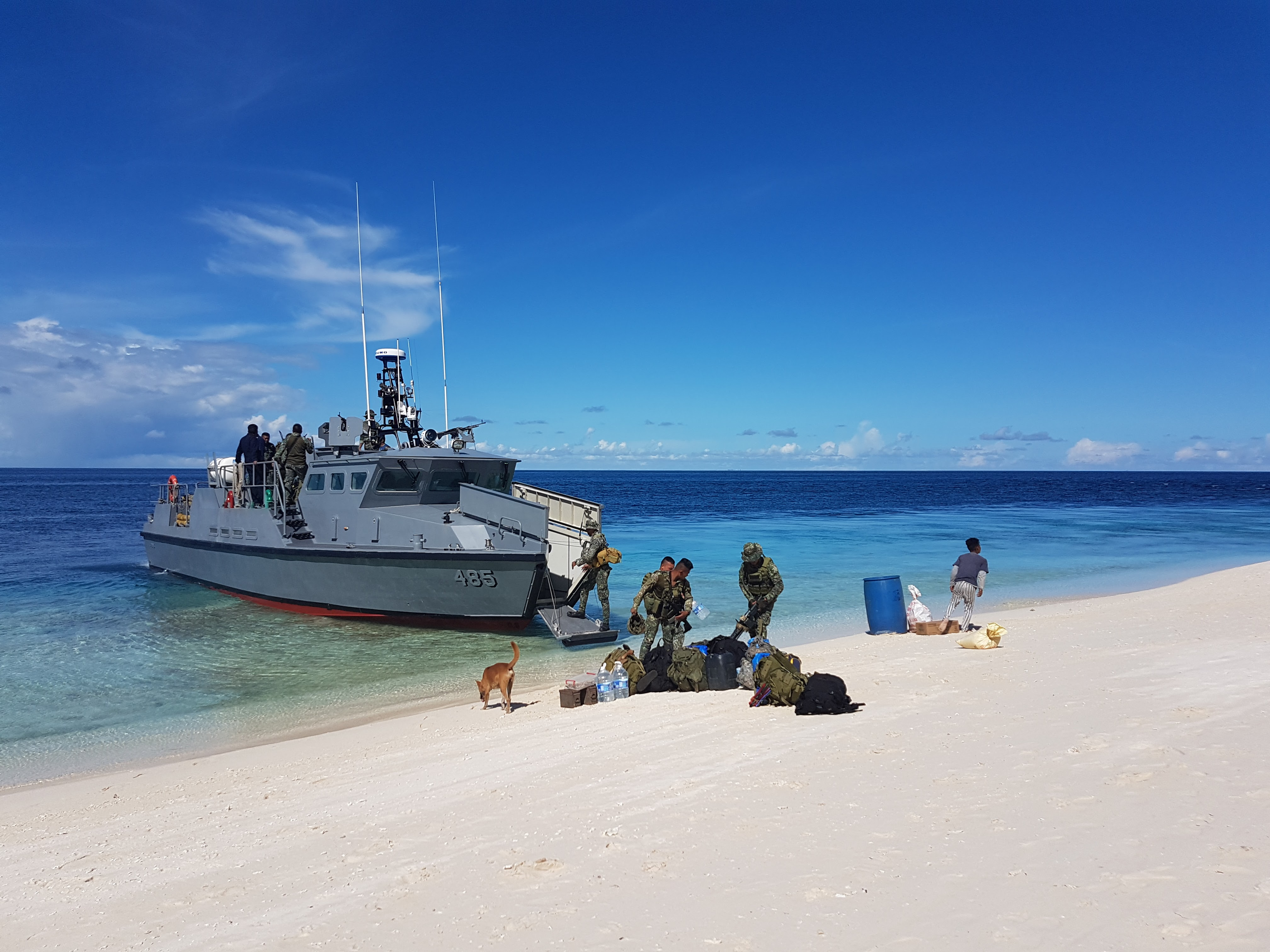
Philippine Navy Multipurpose Assault Craft Mk2

The T65 and T91 assault rifles have been widely exported to many nations with the upper receiver for the T91 been sold on the US civilian market. Taiwanese SOEs have not exported any major high-end weapons systems but the Taiwanese Government is becoming more open to the idea. Private companies have been more successful, with Lungteh Shipbuilding supplying multiple generations of the Multipurpose Assault Craft to the Philippines. The Taiwanese government has expressed increasing interest in supplying high end weapons systems and components to "like-minded democracies".

=== Dual-use items ===
Taiwan manufactures many of the "military grade" computer chips that are used by the American military–industrial complex, especially high performance ones. TSMC manufactured computer chips power the Lockheed Martin F-35 fighter. TSMC has faced pressure from the US government to move more of its military chip production to the United States. There have been reports of Taiwanese produced chips being used in Chinese missiles, although these reports have been disputed by the Taiwanese Ministry of Economic Affairs.

Ukrainian engineers claimed to have found numerous commercial off-the-shelf Taiwanese components in Russian weaponry used in the Russo-Ukrainian war, including five on the Kh-47M2 Kinzhal. Taiwanese components were also found in the ZALA Lancet loitering munition, Kh-101 cruise missile, and Ka-52 attack helicopter. Taiwanese components were also found in the wreckage of a North Korean Hwasong-11A (KN-23) (or Hwasong-11B, American name KN-24) ballistic missile purchased from Russia and fired at Ukraine, making up a small minority of the 270 foreign components identified. Significant quantities of nitrocellulose (used in gunpowder production) from Taiwanese producers have made its way to Russia during the war, primarily through traders in Turkey. The Taiwanese government enhanced export restrictions on nitrocellulose after the diversions to Russia and Belarus were reported in the press.

In 2025 the American government sanctioned two Taiwanese companies, Mecatron Machinery Co Ltd and Joemars Machinery and Electric Industrial Co Ltd, for providing drone related goods and services to Iran.

== Trade shows ==
The Taipei Aerospace & Defense Technology Exhibition is the primary Taiwanese defense industry trade show, it is held biennially.

== See also ==
- Aerospace industry in Taiwan
- Defense industry of Israel
- Defense industry of Russia
- Defense industry of Japan
- Taiwan and weapons of mass destruction
- Formosat-8
- Hui Long-class UUV
- CSBC Endeavor Manta
- Israel–Taiwan relations
- Jiupeng Military Base
