= T86 assault rifle =

Taiwanese assault rifle

5.56 mm T86 assault rifle
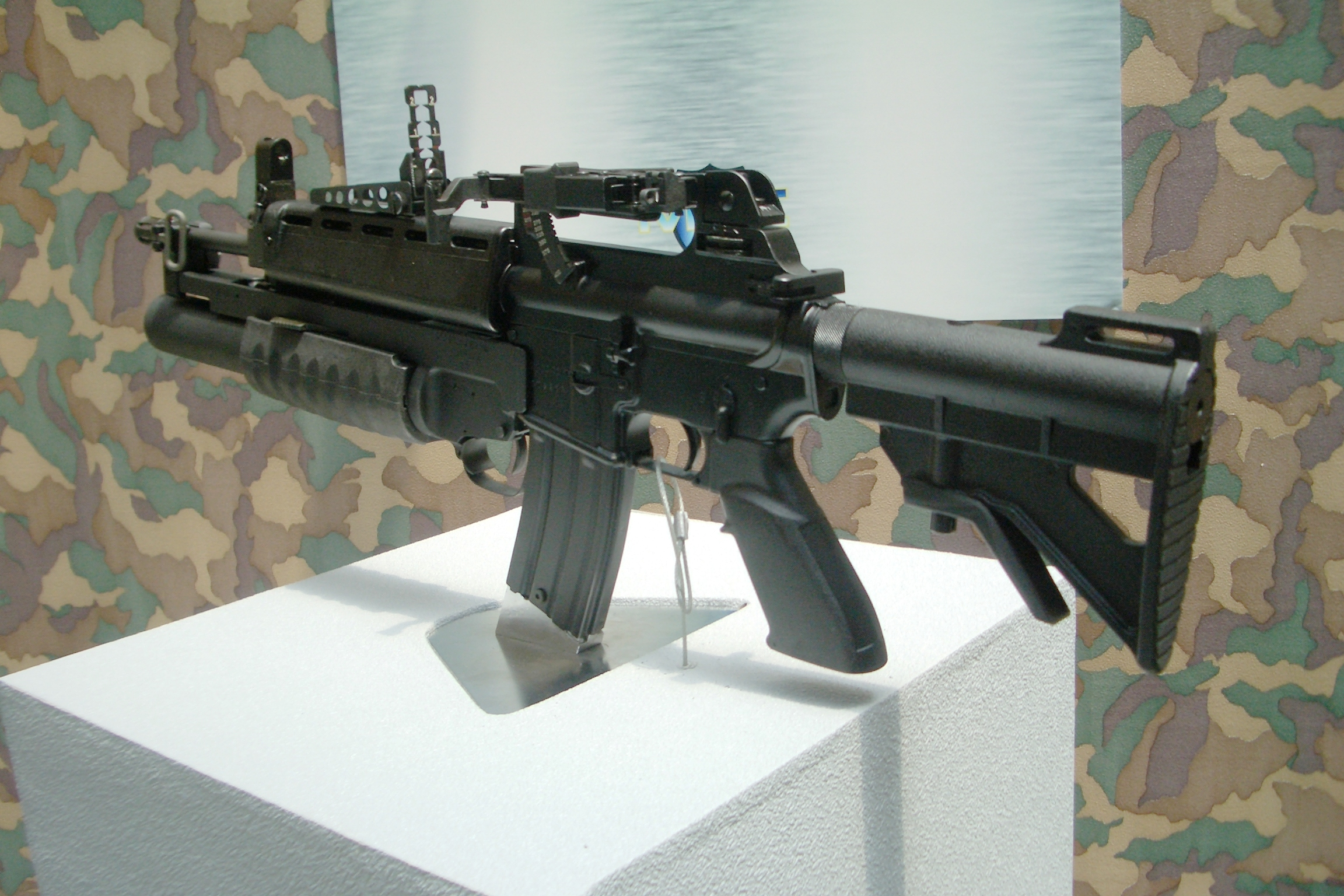
- The T86 with T85 grenade launcher.
- Type: Assault rifle
- Place of origin: Republic of China (ROC)

Service history
- In service: 2000–present
- Used by: See Users

Production history
- Designed: 1992–1998
- Manufacturer: 205th Armory
- Produced: 2000–2002
- No. built: 4,800+

Specifications
- Mass: 3.17 kg (7.0 lb)
- Length: 880 mm (34.6 in) (stock extended); 800 mm (31.5 in) (stock retracted)
- Barrel length: 375 mm (14.8 in)
- Cartridge: 5.56×45mm NATO
- Action: Gas-operated, rotating bolt
- Rate of fire: 700–800 RPM
- Muzzle velocity: 840 m/s (2,756 ft/s)
- Effective firing range: Over 300 m
- Feed system: Various STANAG Magazines.
- Sights: M16A2-style sights with windage and elevation adjustments, optional optical and night-vision sights

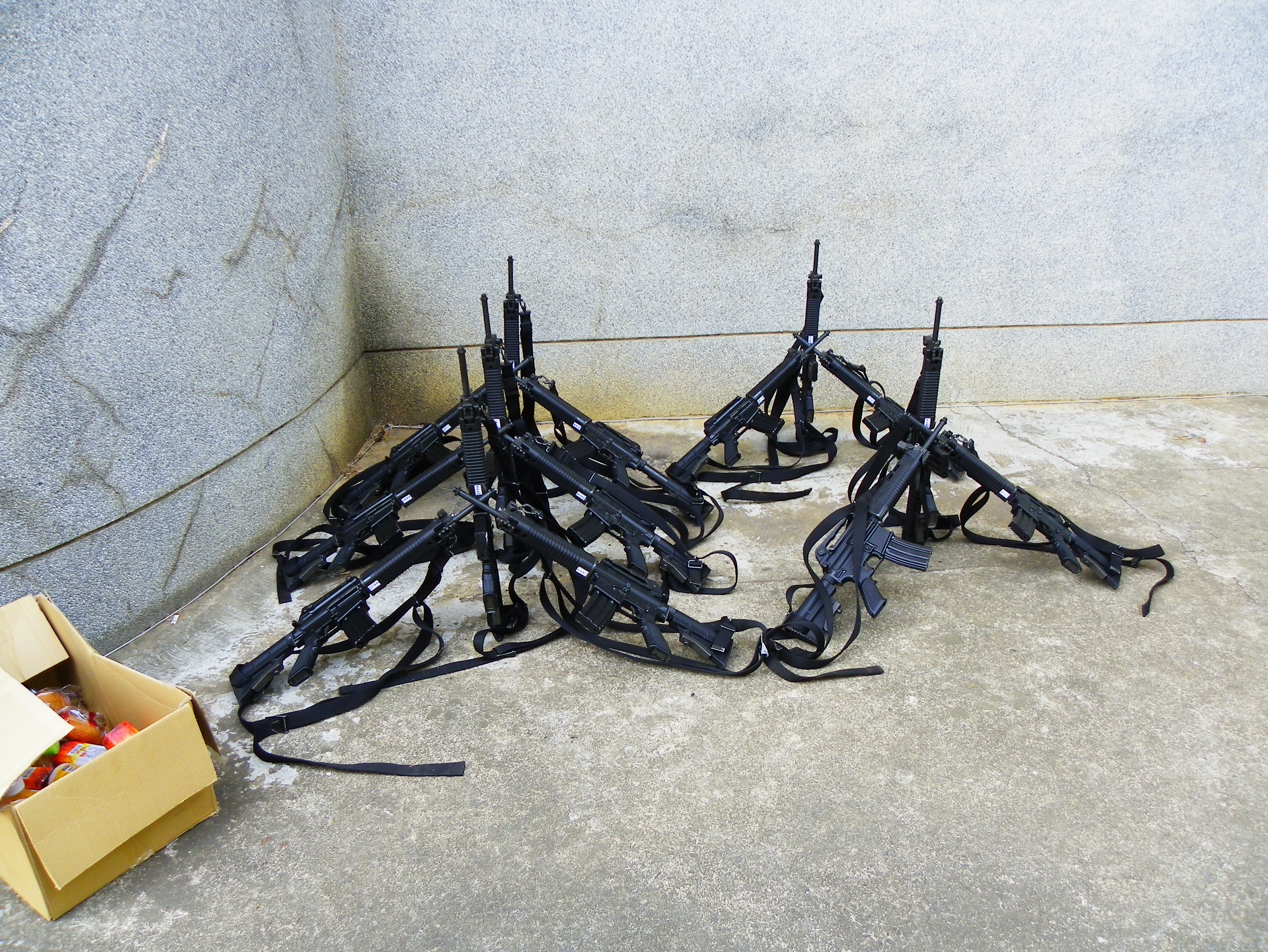
Stacked T86 assault rifles

The T86 (聯勤 Type 86) rifle is a gas-operated, magazine-fed, assault rifle. It is the second original rifle design conducted by the 205th Armory of Combined Logistics Command of the Republic of China Armed Forces. Though it saw limited production and service after a protracted development process, it became the basis of the T91 currently in volume production for the Taiwanese armed forces.

== History ==
Development of the T86 started in 1992, with the stated objective of replacing the T65 series. Several radical concepts, such as caseless ammunition, were explored but ultimately rejected due to high risk. Still, the XT86 prototype revealed to the public in 1996 demonstrated several innovative features and significant departure from US influence in firearms design.

However, the ROC military was more confident in the tried-and-true T65 design, and instructed the 205th Armory to redesign the rifle. The XT86 pre-production model rolled out in 1997 showed a return to the T65's features, especially the T65K3 carbine.

The T86 design was finalized in 1998, and officially named the 5.56 mm T86 Combat Rifle (5.56公厘T86戰鬥步槍).

== Design ==
The finalized T86 design is an evolution of the T65 series. It inherits the short-stroke gas piston operated system from the T65 as well as the rotating bolt design. Upper and lower receiver are made with aircraft-grade aluminum. The side-folding metal stock on the prototype was replaced with an M4 carbine style polymer telescopic stock and buffer mechanism. The polymer handguard from the prototype was retained.

The controls of the T86 are similar to the T65 and M16. The T86 has a 4-position selector with safe, semiautomatic, three-round burst, and automatic settings. Like the T65K2, the T86 utilizes an M16A2-style front post/rear peephole sight. The rear sight is adjustable for windage and elevation. One notable difference is that the T86 does not have a forward assist, and the brass deflector is shaped differently.

The T86 has a 375 mm (14.8 in) barrel with flash suppressor. The rate of rifling twist is one twist in 178 mm (7.0 in). The bore is chrome-lined and the T86 can fire all 5.56×45mm NATO standard ammunition. Magazines used by the ROC military feature two protrusions on each side to avoid over-insertion, but standard STANAG magazines are compatible.

The T86 is modular and can be field-stripped without using special tools. The gas piston system and the trigger assembly can be removed as complete assemblies for maintenance, reducing the risk of losing small parts.

=== Accessories ===
A picatinny rail is provided on the carrying handle for an optional scope mount.

The T85 40 mm grenade launcher may be mounted on the T86.

== Production and usage ==
Contrary to initial expectations, the ROC Army and Marine Corps did not order T86 carbines in large quantities. Defense budget priorities during the late 1990s forced the ROC military to delay the replacement of T65K1 and T65K2 assault rifles. A small quantity of T86 did enter service with the ROC Navy Underwater Demolition Team and underwent rigorous trials in widely varied environmental conditions.

Jordanian royal guards and special troops are reportedly armed with Taiwanese-made T86 carbines.

== Users ==
- Haiti
- Iraq
- Jordan
- Taiwan
- United Arab Emirates

== See also ==
- T91 assault rifle
- T112 assault rifle
