= XT-86 Mortar =

Taiwanese heavy mortar prototype

The XT-86 mortar is a heavy mortar developed by the 202nd Factory of the Combined Logistics Command of the Ministry of National Defense of the Republic of China (now the Armament Bureau of the Ministry of National Defense of the Republic of China). It was originally expected to replace the in-service T-63 120mm mortar, which has a shorter range. It has a fire rate of 15 rounds per minute and a range of 8,000 meters and 10,000 meters with TC-63 and TC-86 120mm mortar rounds respectively.

== Design ==
Unlike the previously utilized T-63 120mm mortar, the XT-86 has a longer barrel (from the original 172 cm to 214.8 cm) and is made of nickel-chromium-molybdenum high-strength alloy steel, which can withstand Maximum pressure of 22,000 psi. In addition to the basic drop-shot design, the bottom of the barrel also has the dual functions of "pull-and-shoot" and safety, providing more options for tactical use.The bipod is equipped with a hydraulic shock absorber, which can absorb the vibration generated during shooting and greatly increase the accuracy of the hit. The steering gear, elevation gear, and auxiliary steering gear adopt ball screw design to reduce the probability of backlash and make the operation smoother. The gun barrel has an elevation angle of 40 to 80 degrees, and can be operated and fired in all directions of 360 degrees, with a maximum firing rate of 15 rounds per minute.

The gun weighs 226 kg, which is obviously not something that infantry can carry. Thus, it is equipped with a newly developed wheeled towing system (weighing another 200 kg). For short-distance movement, it can be pulled by three soldiers; and for long-distance transportation, it can be towed by a HUMVEE or a truck. It only takes 30 seconds to enter the firing position and mount the gun, and it can be deployed and ready for firing within 1 minute. It also only takes 1 minute to put the gun away and evacuate the position. The ammunition used is the newly designed TC-86 120mm wing-stabilized high-explosive mortar shell, with a muzzle velocity of 430 meters per second and a maximum range of 10,000 meters, which is near to that of the M101 105mm howitzer or the domestic T-63 105mm howitzer, where the maximum range is only 500 meters shorter than the two. If the TC-63 120mm high-explosive mortar shell is used, the maximum range is only 8,000 meters, while its explosion is said to be comparable to that of a 105mm howitzer.

Compared with the T-63 120mm mortar, M101 105mm howitzer, and T-63 105mm howitzer, this gun has the characteristics of simple structure and easy maintenance. Its accuracy and maximum rate of fire are also far superior to the above three guns. Therefore, the Ministry of National Defense of the Republic of China once planned to use this to replace the above three types of artillery, but it was not implemented in the end for unknown reasons. Also, the TC-86 was then not used supposedly due to its higher requirement of barrel pressure.

== See also ==
- Armaments Bureau
- M101 howitzer
- Republic of China Army
