= XT-97 assault rifle =

XT97
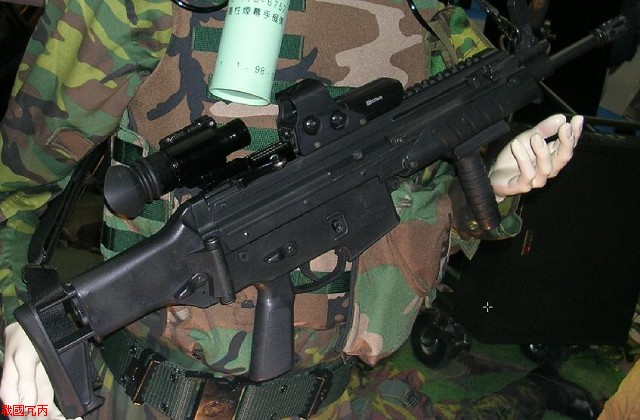
- The XT-97 assault rifle
- Type: Assault rifle
- Place of origin: Taiwan

Production history
- Designed: 2008
- Manufacturer: 205th Arsenal

Specifications
- Mass: 4 kg (excluding magazine)
- Length: 850 mm (stock extended); 770 mm (stock retracted); 580 mm (stock folded)
- Barrel length: 370 mm
- Cartridge: 5.56×45mm NATO; 9×19mm Parabellum
- Action: Gas-operated, rotating bolt
- Rate of fire: 850 rpm
- Effective firing range: 600 m
- Feed system: Various STANAG Magazines.
- Sights: Various optical sights on Picatinny railing. Folding front and rear backup iron sights.

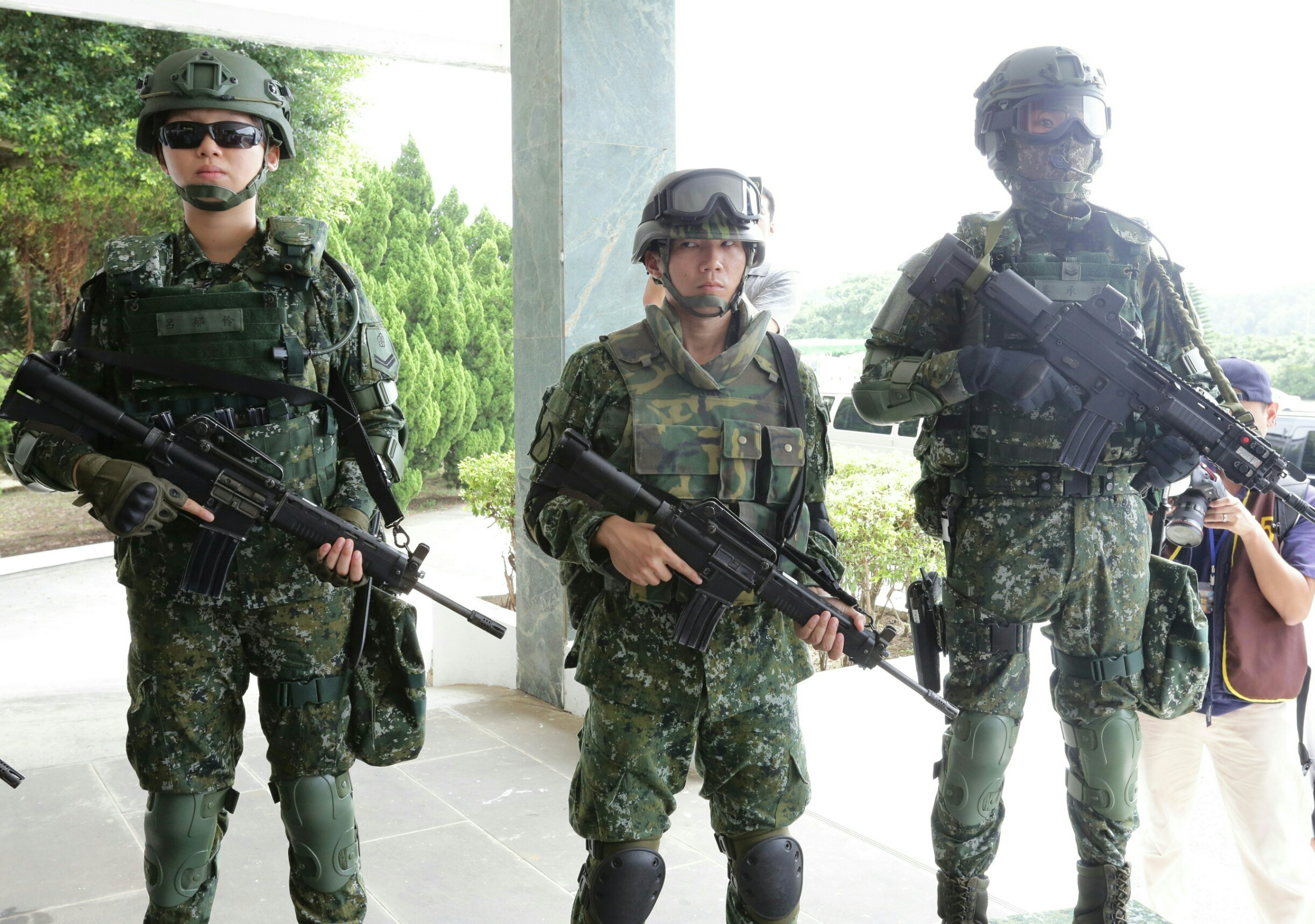
XT97 on the right

The XT-97 assault rifle (5.56公釐XT97突擊步槍) is a 5.56mm assault rifle developed by the 205th Armory, Ministry of National Defense in Taiwan. It was first displayed in public during the 2009 Taipei Aerospace & Defense Technology Exhibition.

== Design ==
The weapon is designed in Taiwan. The design departs significantly from the T65 assault rifle lineage with the bolt being based on the AK design. The stock is both retractable and foldable. Any optical scope/sight can be placed on the picatinny rails.

Intended users of the XT97 rifle include infantry, airborne, marines, artillery, and mechanized/motorized vehicle crew.

No figures have been released on volume production.

== Variants ==
=== XT105 ===
The XT105 is a refined version of the XT97 released in 2015, the first unit off of the production line was gold-plated. It features interchangeable 300mm, 360mm, and 450mm barrels. The upper receiver is made from a single piece of extruded aluminum and the lower receiver is made of polymer. The stock features holes which can hold the rifle's takedown pins during field stripping.

The 205th Factory stated that this gold-plated rifle was the first prototype ever made and holds commemorative significance, hence the special copper plating. No more gold-plated rifles of the same model will be produced in the future. However, XT105 rifles with camouflage paint were also on display, and the factory indicated that they could be painted according to customer requests in the future.

=== XT107 ===
The XT107 is a refined version of the XT105 released in 2017.

== See also ==
- Howa Type 20
