= Karmin International =

Taiwanese boatbuilding company

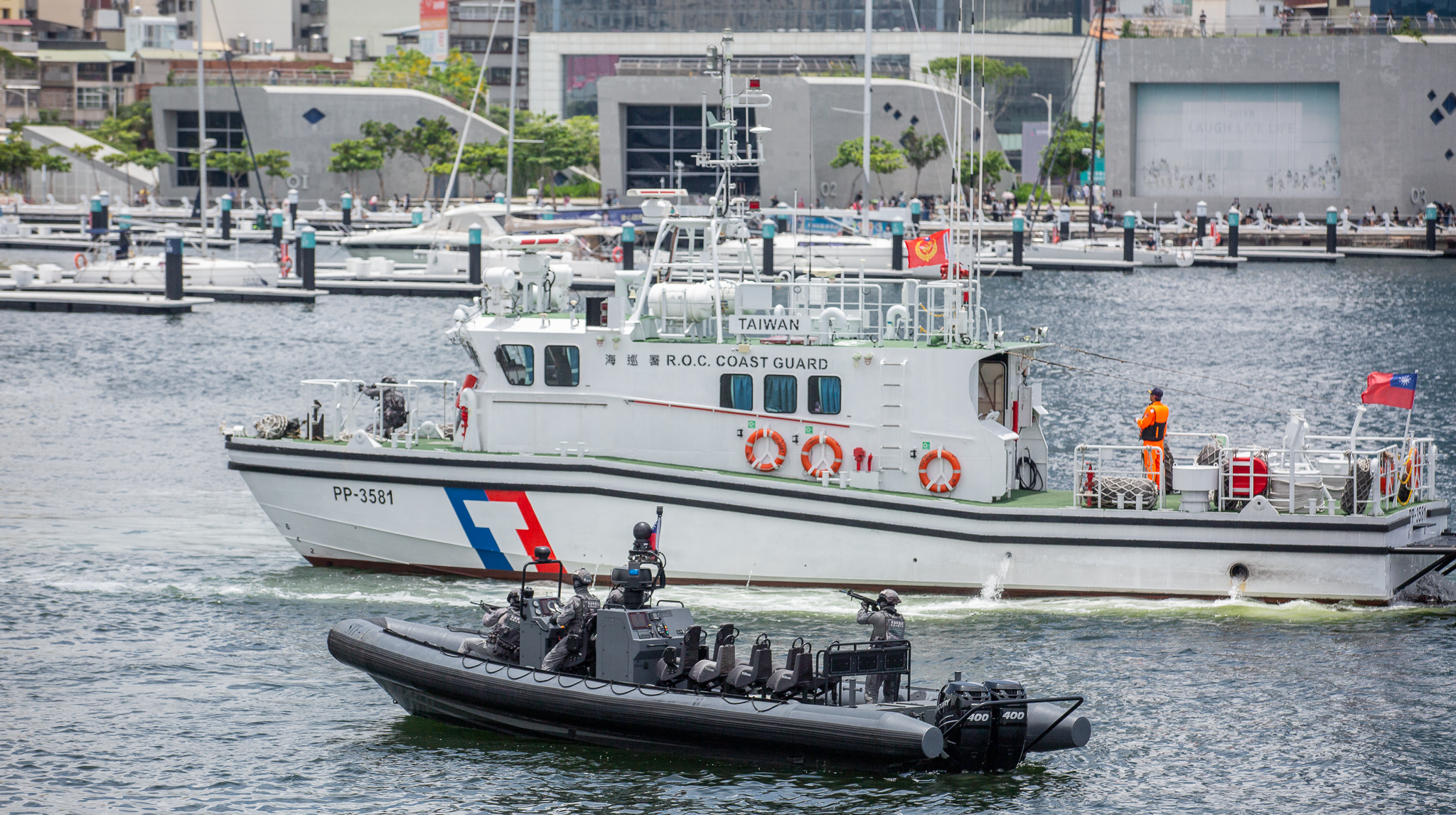
Karmin International K92 assault boat of the Special Task Unit alongside a Coast Guard Administration patrol boat

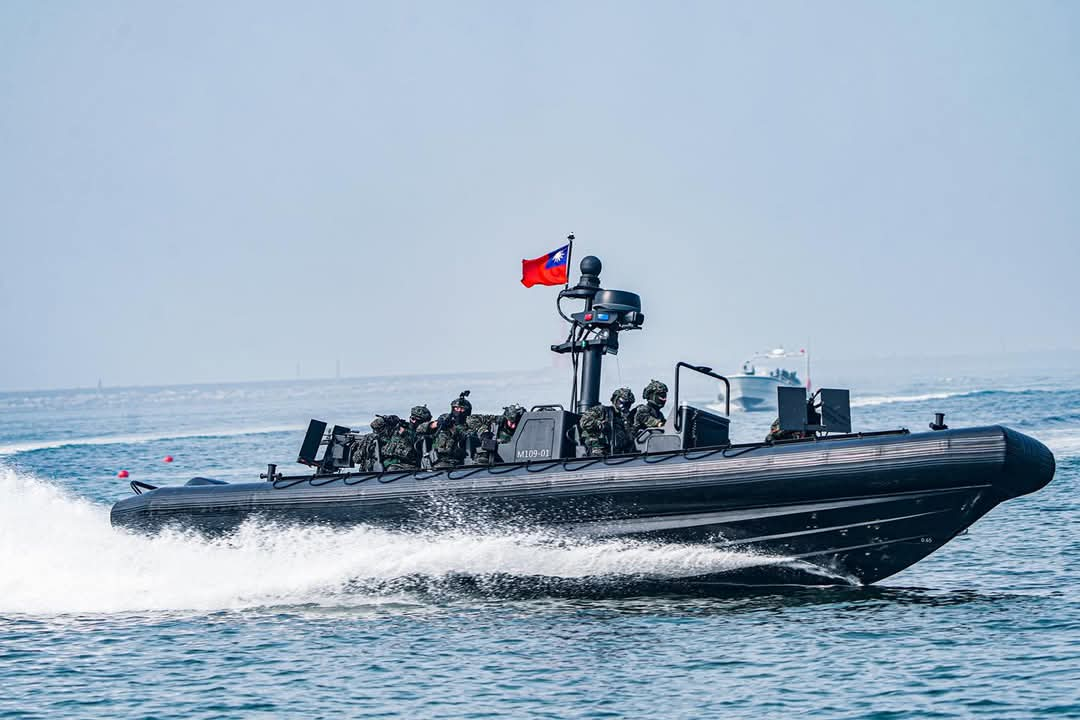
M109 assault boat in Taiwanese military service

Karmin International is a Taiwanese boatbuilding company specializing in the design of high speed rigid inflatable boats.

== History ==
Karmin International was founded in 1988 as Pro Ocean Yacht and originally focused on producing recreational fishing boats; however, strong demand from the Taiwanese Coast Guard caused them to focus on rigid inflatable boats.

In 2020 Karmin won a NT$450-million (US$14.9-million) Taiwanese Navy contract for 18 special operations boats and 8 tenders for the Cheng Kung-class frigates.

In 2021 Karmin began delivery of a new class of 11m assault RIB to the ROC Marines. It is designated the M109 fast assault boat in ROCMC service and features a thermal imaging system produced by Kolead Aerospace.

Karmin has assisted a team from National Cheng Kung University (NCKU) in constructing a human powered submarine.

== Customers ==
Karmin has supplied boats to the Taiwanese Navy and Coast Guard, as well as export customers, including the Republic of the Marshall Islands, Palau, Nauru, and Tuvalu.

== Products ==
- K85 assault boat
- K92 assault boat
- M109 assault boat

== See also ==
- Defense industry of Taiwan
