= T75 pistol =

Pistol made in Taiwan

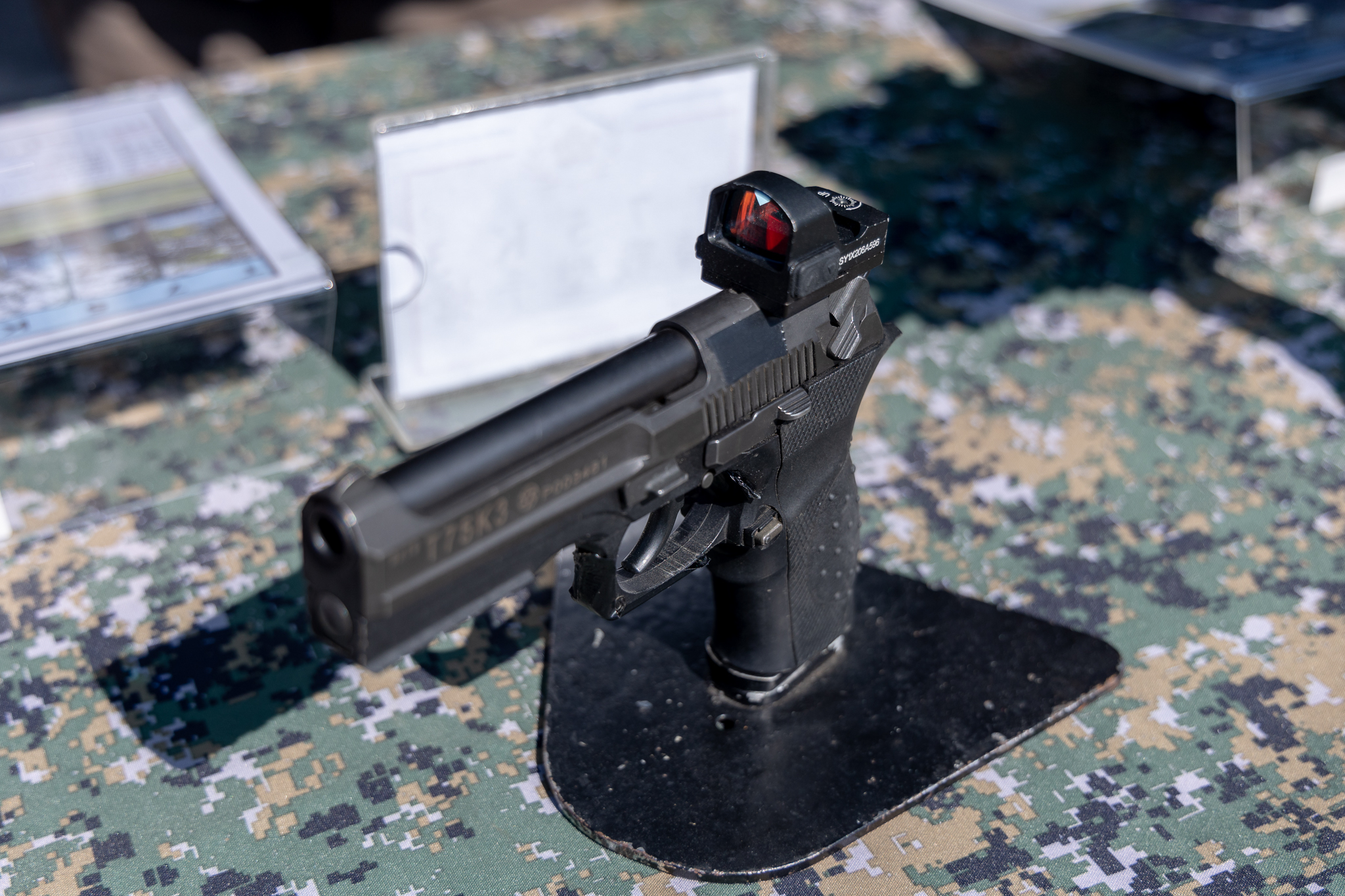
- A T75K3 pistol fitted with attachments, including an optical sight.
- Type: Semi-automatic pistol
- Place of origin: Taiwan

Production history
- Manufacturer: Armaments Bureau
- Variants: XT84, T75K1, T75K2, T75K3

Specifications
- Caliber: 9x19mm Parabellum
- Action: Short recoil
- Muzzle velocity: ~380m/s
- Effective firing range: 50m
- Feed system: Detachable box magazine

The T75 pistol (Chinese: T75手槍) is produced by the 205th Arsenal, Ministry of National Defense in Taiwan. According to Janes, they are also reportedly made available for any country willing to buy them.

== History ==
The T75 was created to replace the aging Type 51, locally produced M1911 pistols.

== Design ==
The T75 is based on the Italian-made Beretta M92 with a 15-round magazine capacity.

== Variants ==
=== Compact variant ===
The T75 had a compact variant that is equipped with a shorter structure and redesigned grip.

=== Suppressor-ready variant ===
The T75 has a suppressor-ready variant for special forces operatives and death penalty executors.

=== XT84 ===
The XT84 project was designed to be similar to the M9 Dolphin selective fire pistol.

=== T75K1 ===
Redesigned T75 variant with a lighter weight with most spare parts redesigned.

=== T75K2 ===
Redesigned T75K1 variant with a lighter weight. Never went into mass production owing to cost issues.

=== T75K3 ===
The T75K3 features lightweight materials and also, polygonal rifling developed at National Defense University which improve both barrel life and weapon accuracy while resulting in lower recoil.

== Users ==
- Taiwan
  - T75K3
    - Republic of China Armed Forces
    - Coast Guard Administration (Taiwan)
    - Judicial Yuan
    - Ministry of Justice

== Gallery ==
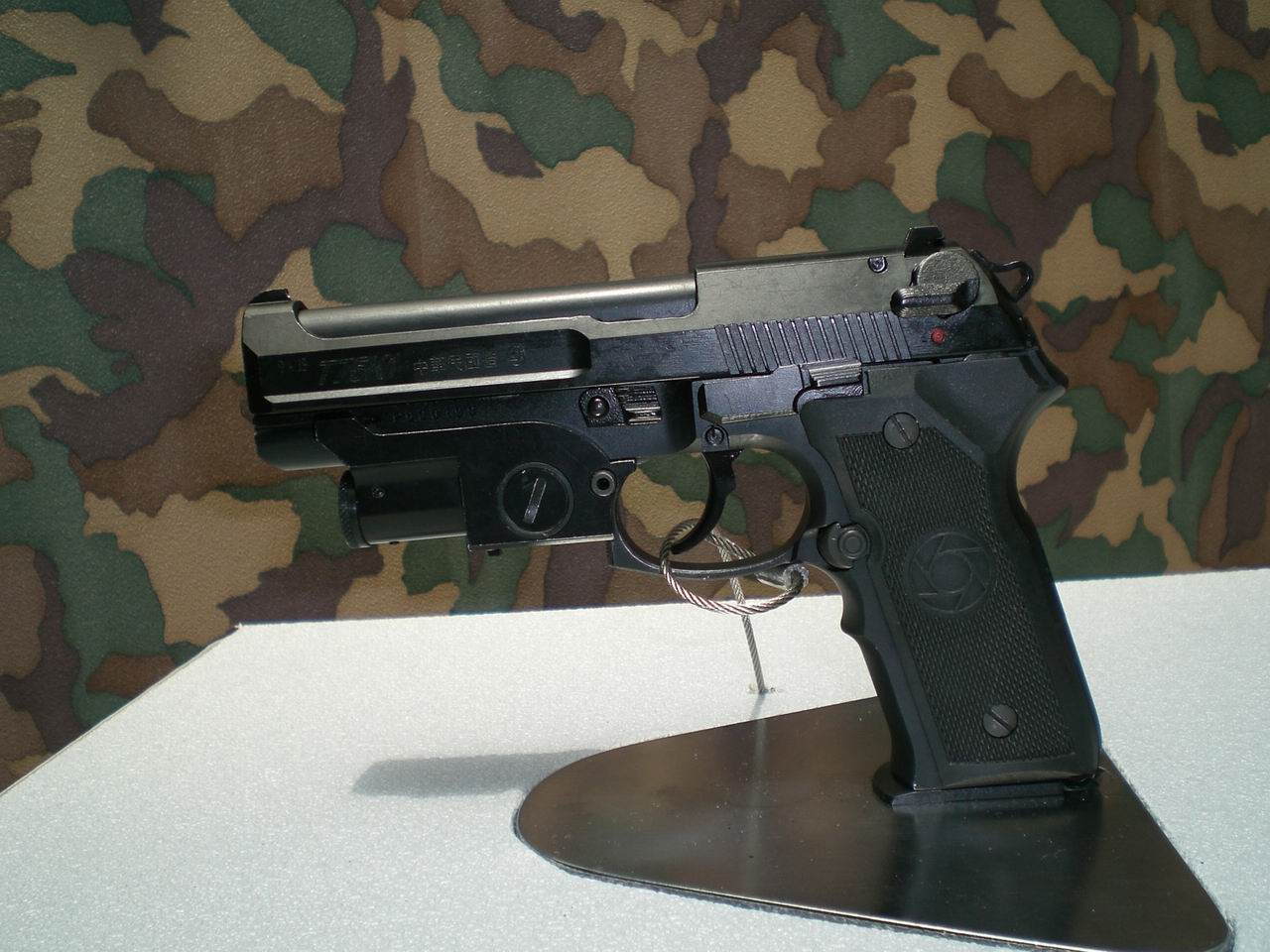
A T75K1 pistol with a laser sight attached.

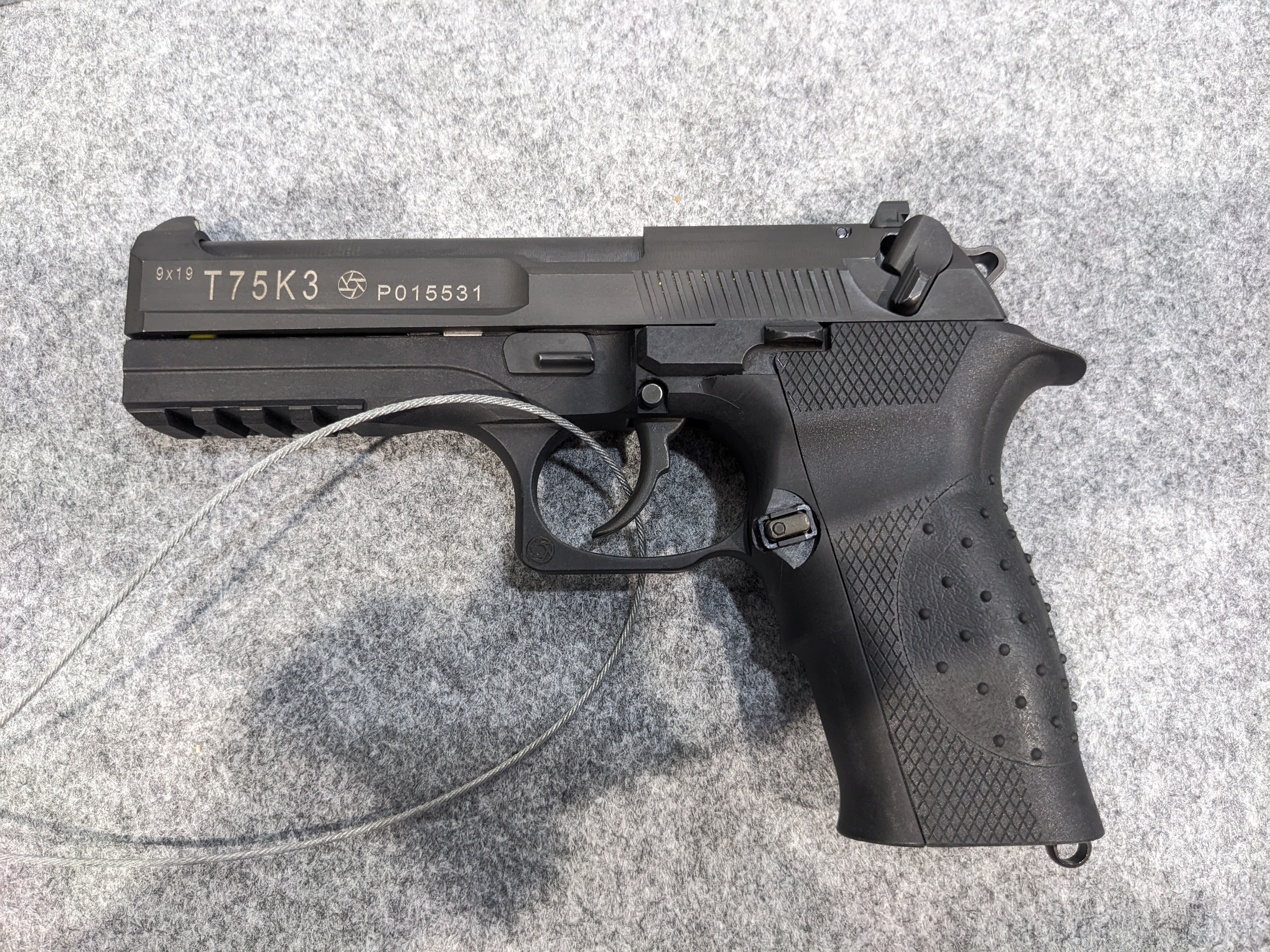
The left side of a T75K3 pistol.

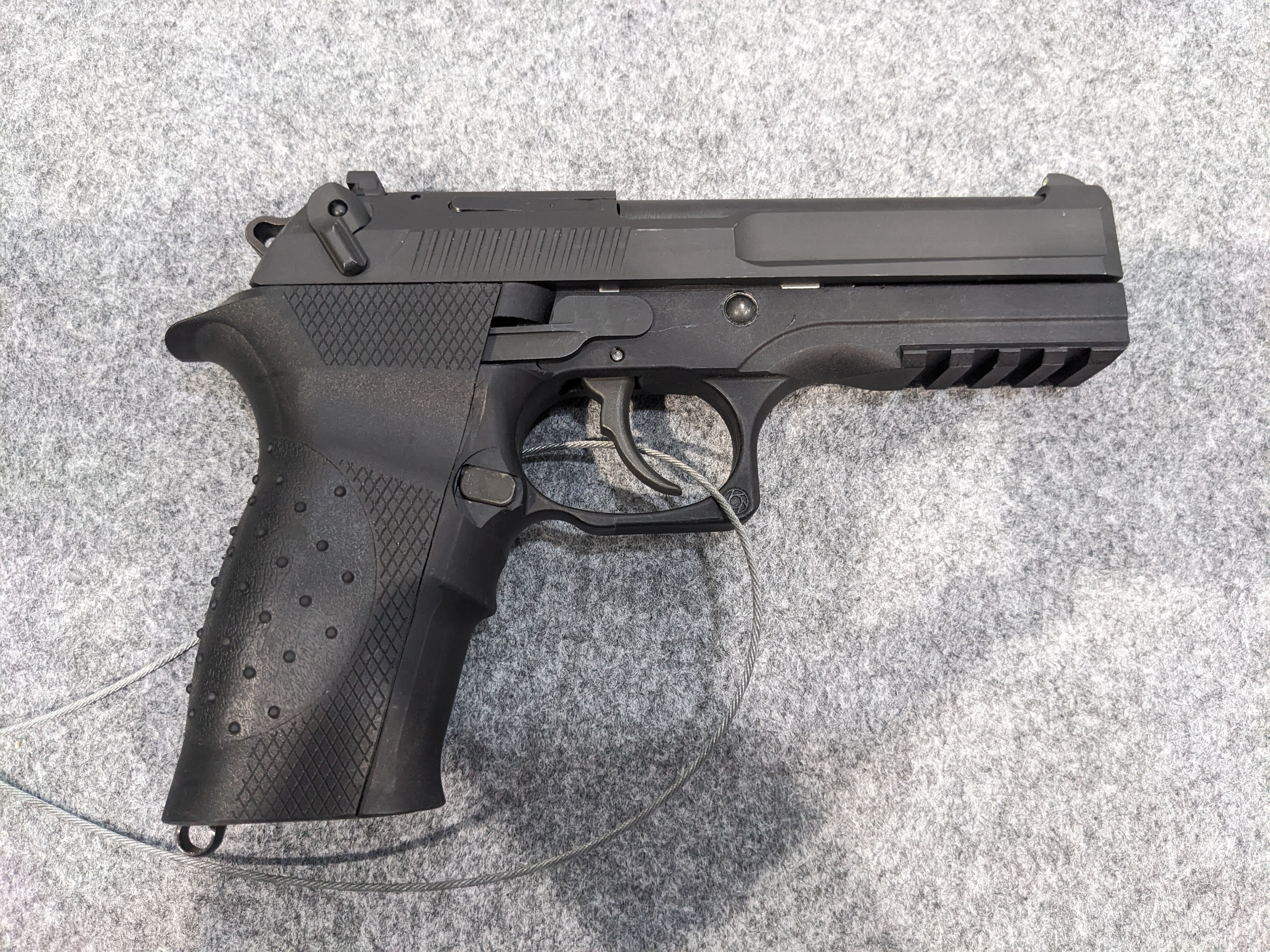
The right side of a T75K3 pistol.

== Bibliography ==
- Jones, Richard D.; Ness, Leland S., eds. (2010). Jane's Infantry Weapons 2010-2011. Jane's Publishing. ISBN 978-0710629081.
