= Armaments Bureau =

Taiwan government agency

Armaments Bureau, MND
- 國防部軍備局; Guófángbù Jūnbèijú

Agency overview
- Formed: 1 March 2002
- Jurisdiction: Republic of China
- Headquarters: Zhongshan District, Taipei; 25.017692°N 121.526789°E
- Parent agency: Ministry of National Defense
- Website: Armaments Bureau

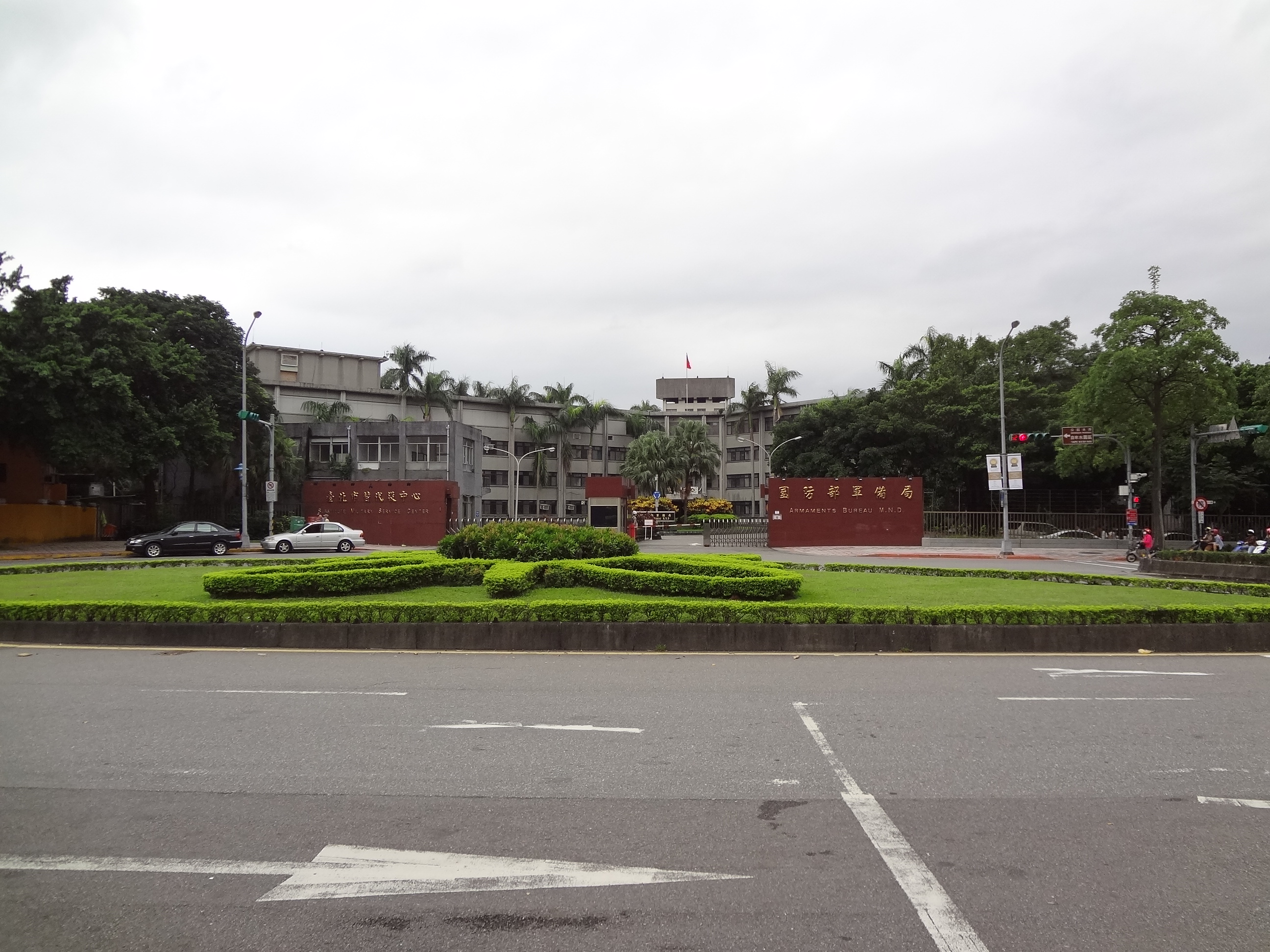
The former site of Armaments Bureau until 2014

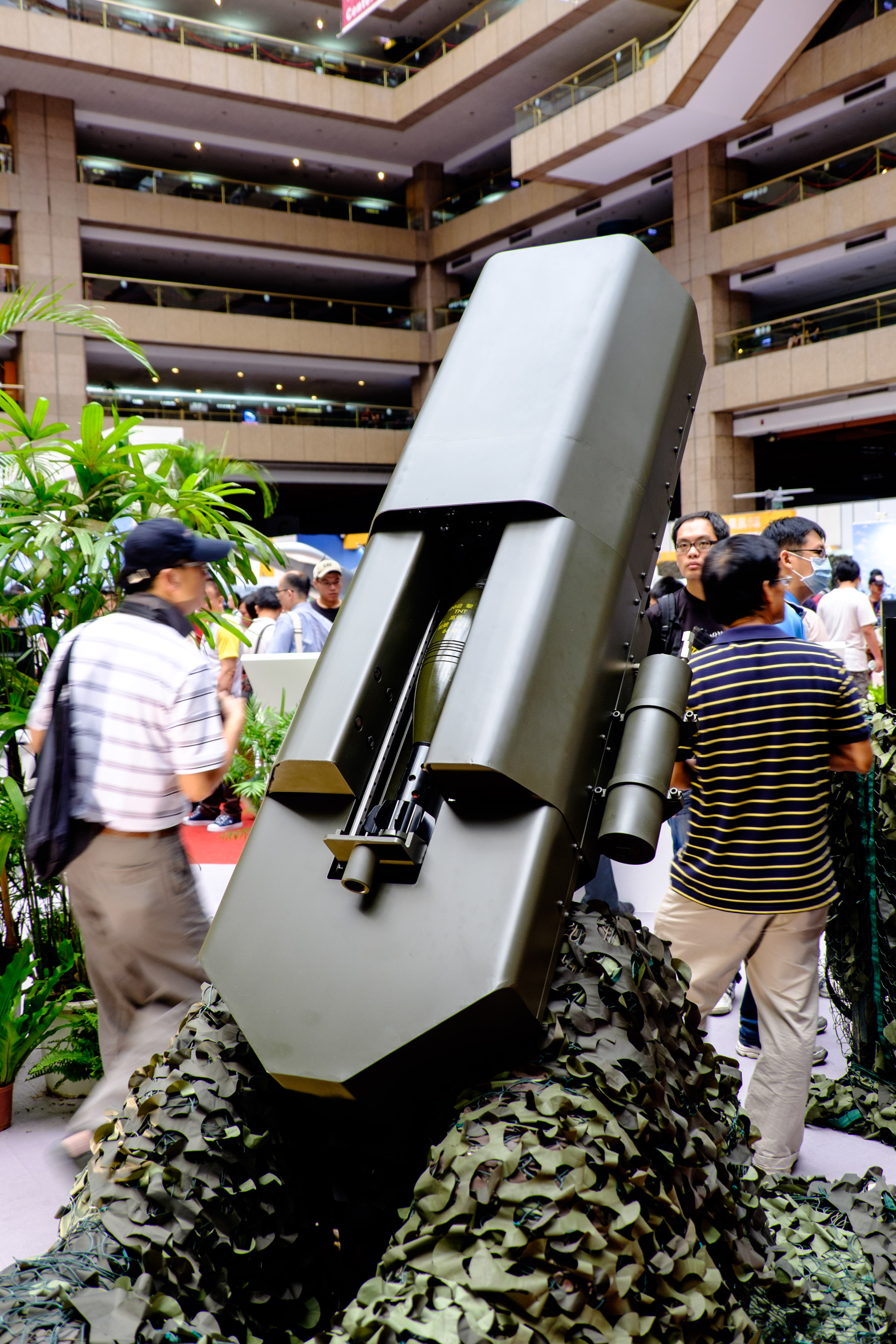
MPC 120mm Advanced Mobile Mortar System and Semi-automatic Muzzle Loading Mechanism

The Armaments Bureau (Chinese: 國防部軍備局; pinyin: Guófángbù Jūnbèijú) is an affiliated authority of the Ministry of National Defense of Republic of China (informally known as Taiwan).

== History ==
With the National Defense Law and revised Organization Law of the Ministry of National Defense went into effect on 1 March 2002, the Armaments Bureau was formulated according to the two laws.

In 2014 the National Chung-Shan Institute of Science and Technology was made an administrative corporation by the government, ending its period of secrecy under the Armaments Bureau and opening up the opportunity to partner with foreign corporations and export equipment internationally. In 2015 Lieutenant General Ho An-ch replaced the retiring Lieutenant General Chin Shou-feng as director of the Armaments Bureau.

In 2020 the Armaments Bureau, along with a number of public and private partners, began developing a powered exoskeleton for military and disaster relief tasks. The program was started because foreign military exoskeleton programs had not yet reached the export stage and as such Taiwan's requests to procure military exoskeletons had been rebuffed. The program was allocated NT$250 million (US$8.3 million) for the 2020 fiscal year with serial production scheduled to begin in 2023.

In 2023 the Armaments Bureau and in particular the 205th Arsenal were the subject of reform efforts by the Control Yuan. Multiple officers were impeached for problems related to corruption and inefficiency. The impeached officers had received favors and gifts from private contractors in return for preferential treatment procurement treatment. The Control Yuan ordered the implementation of improvements to internal oversight and evaluation procedures.

== Organizational structure ==
- Program Evaluation Division
- Technology and Industry Division
- Acquisition Management Division
- Procurement Management Division
- Construction and Real Estate Division
- Management Information Office
- General Administration Office
- Comptroller Office

== Arsenals ==
=== Headquarters ===
The bureau headquarters is accessible within walking distance South West from Dazhi Station of the Taipei Metro.

=== 209th Arsenal ===
Responsible for development of CM-32 armoured vehicle. Located in the Nantou County town of Jiji.

=== 205th Arsenal ===
Developers and producers of the T75 pistol, T75 light machine gun, T93 sniper rifle, T91 assault rifle and XT-97 Assault Rifle. Also involved in quadcopter development and production. Based in Kaohsiung.

The 205th Arsenal also sells firearms components and ammunition on the American commercial market.

==== Other products ====
- T112 assault rifle, intended to replace the T91 in regular Taiwanese service.
- T112 sniper rifle, heavy bolt action sniper rifle chambered in .50 BMG. 100 ordered by Taiwanese special forces.
- T108 sniper rifle, medium bolt action sniper rifle chambered in 7.62 NATO. First ordered in 2018. Intended to replace the T93 in regular service.
- XT104, experimental submachine gun chambered in 9mm.
- XT100, experimental assault rifle chambered in 6.8 SPC.

=== 203rd Arsenal ===
Has developed advanced camouflage materials for special forces use.

=== 202nd Arsenal ===
The 202nd Arsenal both designs and produces large and small artillery. They also manufacture munitions for artillery systems.

The 202nd Arsenal has become increasingly involved in drone production.

== See also ==
- Ministry of National Defense (Republic of China)
- National Chung-Shan Institute of Science and Technology
- Defense industry of Taiwan
- XT-86 Mortar
