= T65 assault rifle =

Taiwanese assault rifle

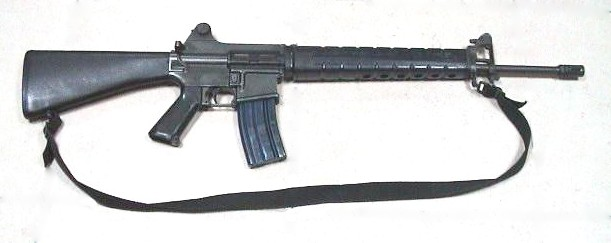
- The CSF Type 65 rifle
- Type: Assault rifle
- Place of origin: Taiwan

Service history
- In service: 1976-present
- Used by: See Users
- Wars: Salvadoran Civil War; United States invasion of Panama; First Liberian Civil War; Second Liberian Civil War; Iraq War; First Libyan Civil War; Haitian conflict (2020–present)

Production history
- Designer: Combined Logistics Command
- Designed: 1976
- Manufacturer: 205th Arsenal
- Produced: 1976-1997
- No. built: 150,000 (T65); 24,000 (T65K1); 300,000 (T65K2)
- Variants: See Variants

Specifications
- Mass: 3.31 kg (7.3 lb)
- Length: 990 mm (39 in)
- Barrel length: 508 mm (20.0 in)
- Cartridge: 5.56×45mm NATO
- Caliber: 5.56mm (.223 in)
- Action: Gas-operated, rotating bolt
- Rate of fire: 700-800 RPM
- Feed system: Various STANAG Magazines.
- Sights: Iron sights

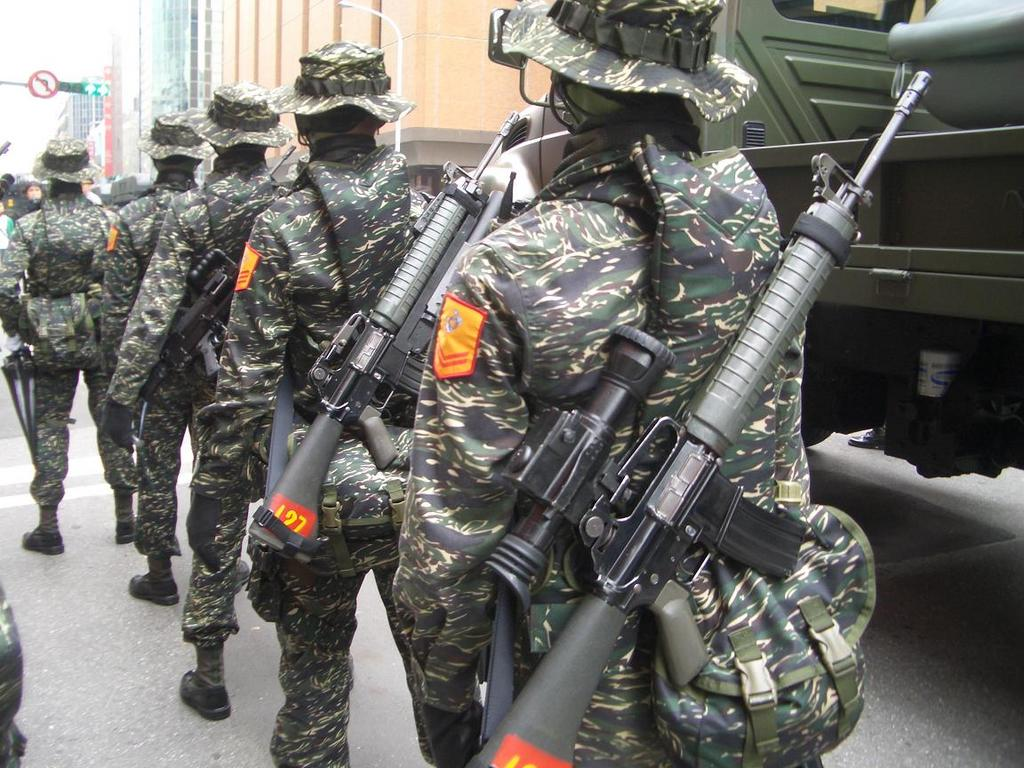
T65K2 with Republic of China (Taiwan) infantry.

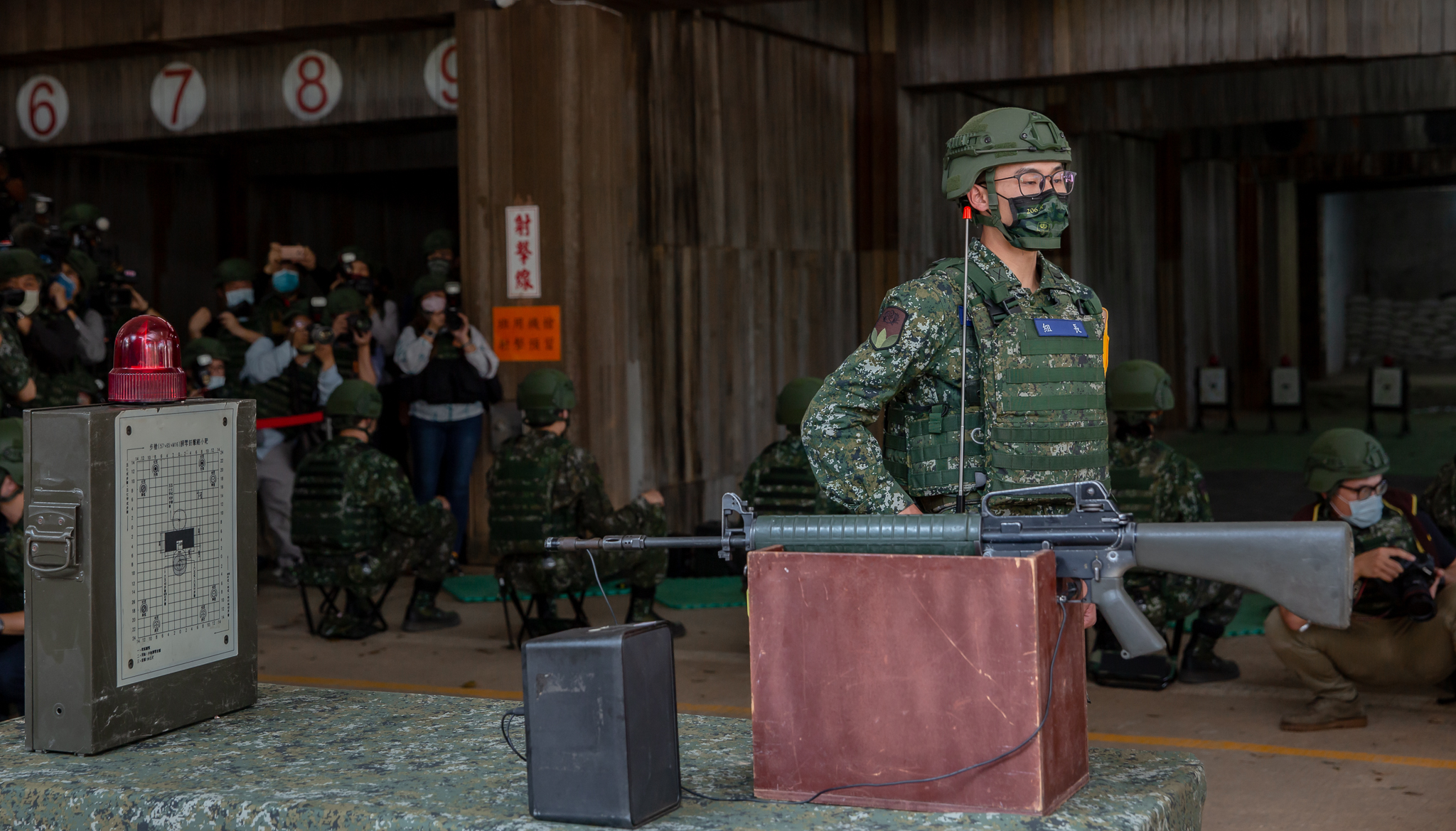
Republic of China (Taiwan) Army 206 Brigade educational mobilization to training to use T65K2 assault rifle.

The T65 (聯勤 Type 65) is an assault rifle developed and manufactured by the Combined Logistics Command of the Republic of China (Taiwan) Armed Forces of Taiwan. Originally patterned after the Armalite AR-18 that has a short-stroke gas system, the prototype unveiled in 1975 showed a rifle that is heavily influenced by the AR-15 family of rifles, albeit with modified iron sights, a reshaped stock, and redesigned handguards. The designated number '65' refers to the Year 65 of the Republic of China (Taiwan) (1976), the year the rifle's design was finalized.

The T65 series served as the standard issue weapon for front-line usage of the Republic of China (Taiwan) Army and the Republic of China (Taiwan) Marine Corps until being replaced by the more technologically advanced T91 in the early 2000s. T65 rifles are currently used by Taiwan’s Army Reserves, Army Basic Training Centers, Air Force and the Taiwan National Police Agency.

== History ==
The T65 assault rifle was developed to replace M14 rifles imported from the United States. Reports on the original T65 rifle suggested that it performed poorly, but was later improved and became the T65K2. Experience with the T65 later led to the development of the T86 carbine, followed by the T91 carbine.

== Design ==
The T65 assault rifle is a gas operated, select fire rifle. It uses an AR-15 style two-part aluminum receiver and similar rotating bolt action, although the gas system is a short-stroke gas piston, compared with the AR-15's direct gas impingement system. The piston is located above the barrel and concealed within the handguards. The T65 design replaced the carrying handle of M16 pattern rifles with a rear sight block. The carrying handle returned with the T65K2 (but was removable on the T91 carbine). The T65 uses magazines compatible with AR-15 pattern rifles.

The T65 assault rifle is the first 5.56×45mm NATO rifle adopted by the Taiwanese military, with the project starting in 1968. The design sought to improve the AR-15 design by replacing the direct impingement system with a short stroke gas piston, improving the reliability of the rifle.

The T65 has a fire selector with three positions: safe, semiautomatic and fully automatic. It takes standard STANAG magazines, and the piston has its own spring recovery. After firing the gas following the bullet pushes the piston towards the receiver, it connects with the front of the bolt carrier, and the bolt carrier is driven back by inertia. The bolt itself is near identical to an AR-15.

It can be equipped with a bayonet, which is a clone of the M7 bayonet.

== Variants ==
- T65
- T65K1
- T65K2
  - T65K2 Carbine
- T65K3

== Users ==
- Costa Rica: Used by Costa Rican security forces.
- Guatemala
- Dominican Republic
- El Salvador: Used by El Salvadoran military and police.
- Haiti: Used by Haitian police.
- Honduras: Used by Honduran Police.
- Liberia: Reported to be used in the country.
- Libya
- Nicaragua
- Panama: Former rifle of the defunct Panama Defense Forces. Acquired 10,000 before the PDF started to use AK-based assault rifles.
- Paraguay
- Taiwan
