= Combined Logistics Command =

Republic of China Combined Logistics Command 聯合後勤司令部
- Emblem of the Republic of China Combined Logistics Command
- Active: 1 June 1946 to 1 April 1950 (joint service headquarters); 1 March 2002 (the Department of Defense Combined Logistics Command) to 28 December 2012.
- Country: Taiwan (Republic of China)
- Role: Logistics
- Size: 130,000 (2008 est.)
- Part of: Republic of China Armed Forces
- Colors: Blue & Gold

Insignia
- Flag

The Combined Logistics Command (Chinese: 聯合後勤司令部) was a division of the Republic of China Ministry of Defence. It was established in 1946, formerly known as Joint Service Headquarters, then referred to as the Combined Logistics Headquarters, responsible for the ROC military complement, insurance, transport, health and ordinance. In 2012 the original unit of the Combined Logistics Command and the Army Warranty Command were reorganized into the Army Logistics Command. The camel symbols used by the Combined Logistics Command were moved to the Ministry of Defense's Armaments Bureau for continued use.

In the past various other departments were under the Combined Logistics Command, including the financial balance (Finance Department Jurisdiction), the printing plant (Measured Department Jurisdiction), plant managements, the national arsenal (Production Department Jurisdiction), the Operations Branch, outpatient centres, and the Cemetery Administration Martyrs Management Group (Business Department Jurisdiction).

In 2002, it was reported that the CLC had exported small arms made in Taiwan to unnamed countries.

== List of Commanders ==
- 黃鎮球 Army General (June 1, 1946-May 28, 1947)
- 郭懺 Army General (June 28, 1947-August 16, 1949)
- 黃鎮球 Army General (-April 1, 1950)
- 王文燮 Army General (July 5, 1993-June 30, 1996)
- 謝建東 Army General (March 1, 2002-February 1, 2003)
- 高華柱 Army General (February 1, 2003-May 20, 2004)
- 戴伯特 Army General (May 20, 2004-February 16, 2006)
- 季麟連 Marine General (February 16, 2006-January 31, 2007)
- 金乃傑 Air Force General (February 1, 2007-October 31, 2008)
- 董翔龍 Admiral (November 01, 2008-May 15, 2011)
- 吳有明 Army General (May 16, 2011-December 28, 2012)
