= T91 assault rifle =

Taiwanese assault rifle

T91
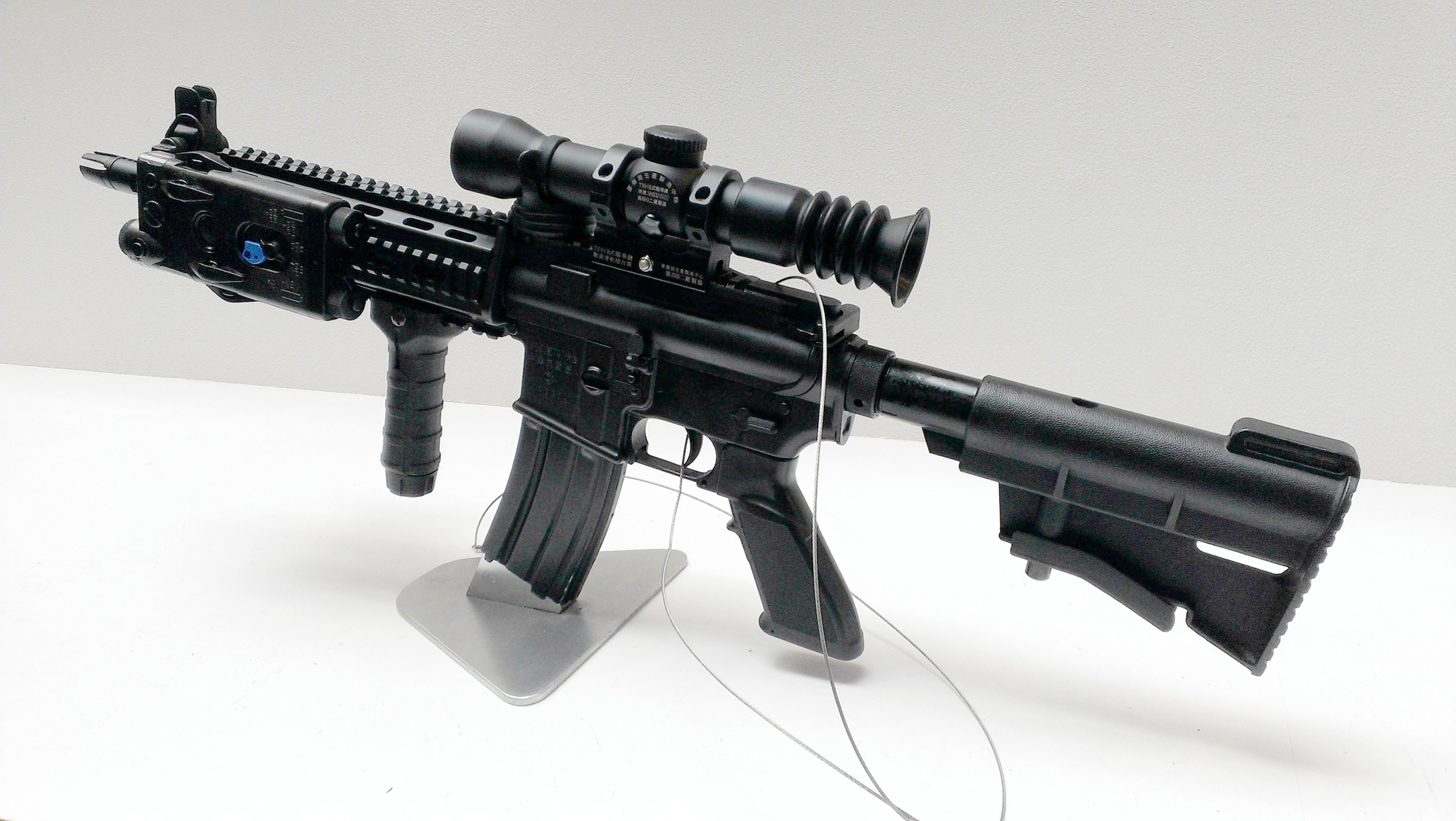
- The Taiwanese T91CQC carbine. Note the forend with integrated rails and the shorter barrel compared to the standard variant.
- Type: Assault rifle
- Place of origin: Taiwan

Service history
- In service: 2003–present
- Used by: See Users

Production history
- Designed: 2002
- Manufacturer: 205th Arsenal
- Unit cost: 600USD(2003)
- Produced: 2003–present
- No. built: 300,000+

Specifications
- Mass: 3.17 kg (7.0 lb)
- Length: 880 mm (34.6 in) (stock extended); 800 mm (31.5 in) (stock retracted) (Standard Rifle)
- Barrel length: 406 mm (16.0 in) (Standard Rifle); 349 mm (13.7 in) (CQC Carbine)
- Cartridge: 5.56×45mm NATO
- Action: Gas-operated, rotating bolt
- Rate of fire: 800-850 rpm
- Muzzle velocity: 975 m/s (Standard Rifle); 840 m/s (CQC Carbine)
- Effective firing range: 400m 600m (with optics)
- Feed system: Various STANAG magazines.
- Sights: M16A2-style sights with windage and elevation adjustments Picatinny rail can be used for mounting various optical sights

The T91 (Chinese: 聯勤5.56公釐T91戰鬥步槍) is a Taiwanese gas-operated, magazine-fed assault rifle chambered for the 5.56×45mm NATO cartridge. It is designed and produced by the 205th Armory of National Defense in Taiwan.

Based on the T86 assault rifle, the T91 inherits the same short-stroke gas system and maintains the controls and ergonomics similar to that of an M16. The T91 is 0.14 kg (0.31 lb) lighter and 110 mm (4.3 in) shorter than the T65 it replaces.

== History ==
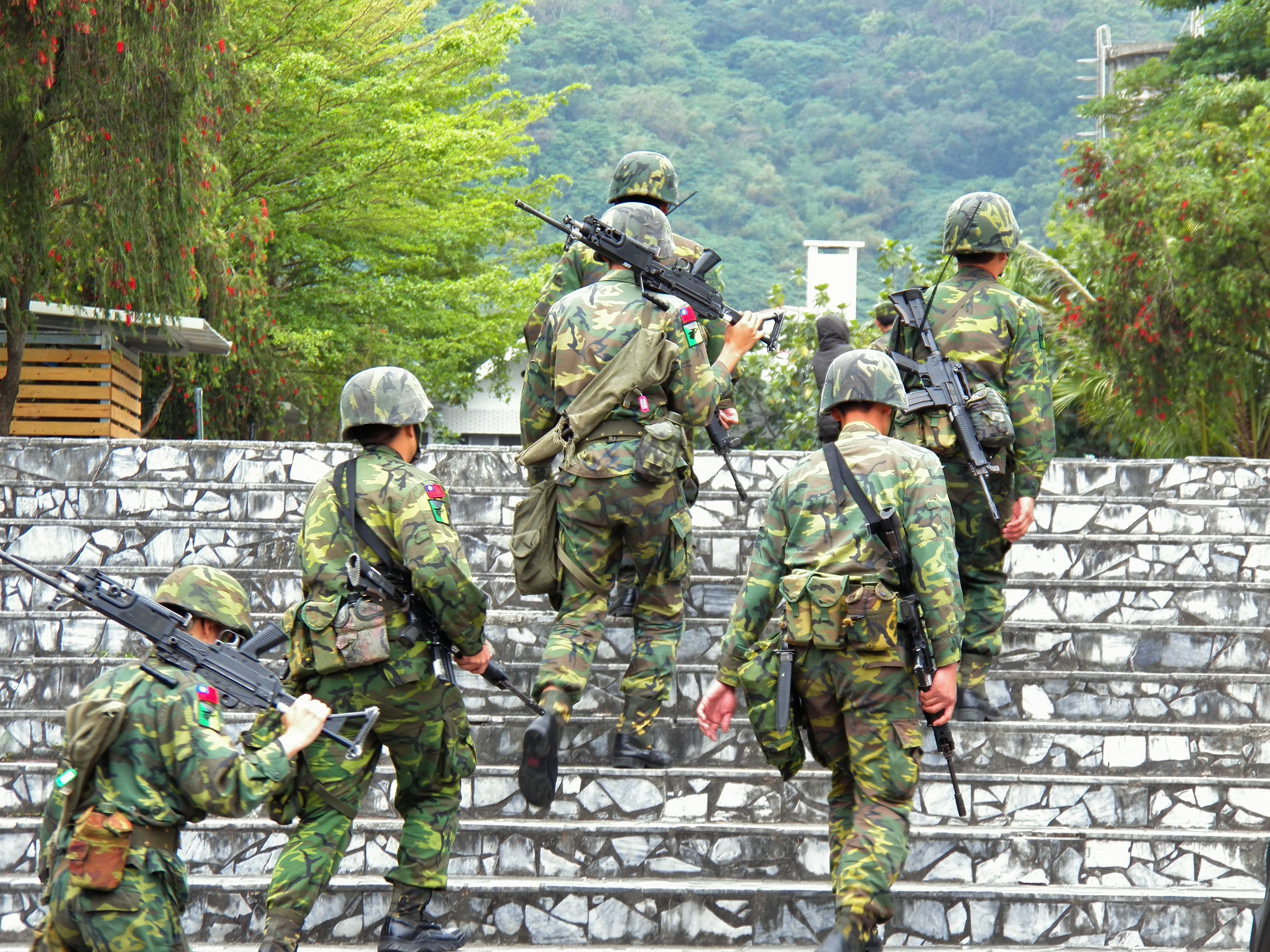
A peloton in 2012 with 2 T75s light machine guns and 4 T91s.

The T91 was a further development of the T86, which had been intended to replace the T65 series in Taiwanese military service. Experience on the previous design and feedback from various users were incorporated into the T91. Development was completed in 2002, and full volume production commenced in 2003.

The T91 was designed to counter the People's Liberation Army's deployment of Type 81 assault rifle and the QBZ-95.

There are rumors that arms dealers had secretly inquired about the possibility of sales to certain militant groups in Southeast Asia, but were reportedly rejected by the Republic of China Ministry of National Defense (MND). The MND neither confirmed nor denied such rumors.

On March 8, 2023, the ROC Marine Corp reported the loss of two T91s from the 99th Marine Brigade's inventory in Kaohsiung.

=== Adoption ===
In 2003, the Taiwanese Army ordered 101,162 T91 combat rifles as force-wide replacements of all service rifles, with a delivery schedule from 2004 to 2008. The total budget amount was NT$1,803 million (US$54.6 million), placing the unit price at about NT$17,800 (US$539). As of April 2006, nine Taiwanese Army armoured, mechanized infantry, and infantry brigades have fully converted to the T91.

In 2005, the Taiwanese Military Police ordered 12,069 T91 combat rifles to equip garrison units in the Taipei capital region. Delivery would span over the next three years.

=== Replacement ===
The T112 assault rifle is intended to replace the T91.

== Design ==
The T91 is a gas-operated short-stroke, air-cooled, rotating bolt, magazine- or drum-fed, select-fire, modularized military rifle compatible with various tactical accessories. Similar to the T86, the T91 is shorter than the T65K2 assault rifle, giving the operator higher mobility and ease of aiming in a confined space.

The T91 has a 4-position selector switch: S – safe, 1 – semi-automatic, 3 – three-round burst, and A – automatic. Like the T65K2, the T91 utilises an M16A2-style front post and rear peephole sight. The rear sight, mounted on the detachable handle, is adjustable for windage and elevation. Operation of the charging handle, magazine release, and bolt release are also the same as the M16. One notable difference is that the T91 does not have a forward assist, and the brass deflector is not as pronounced.

The action of the T91 is based on the T65 series. However, parts are not interchangeable because the bolt lug on the T91 is shorter by 1 mm (0.039 in). The T91 also inherits the modularized gas piston system from the T86, allowing easy removal for maintenance without the risk of losing small parts.

The telescoping stock on the T91 was designed based on the experience of military and police personnel with the M4 Carbine. The resulting product has improved recoil transfer and handling qualities. A rubber recoil pad is also added for comfort. The handguards are triangular in shape.

The T91 has a 416 mm (16.4 in) barrel with flash suppressor. Rate of rifling twist is 178 mm (7.0 in). Due to the use of a shorter barrel, the T91 has 20% more recoil than the T65K2. Average group size at 175 metres (191 yd) also increased by 10 mm (0.39 in). The chamber and bore are chrome-lined and can fire all standard 5.56×45mm NATO ammunition. Standard-issue 30-round detachable box magazines for the T91 feature indicator holes for the top 2-15 rounds as well as two protrusions on each side to avoid over-insertion. However, standard STANAG magazines may also be used.

T91 uppers have also been exported to the United States through Wolf Performance Ammunition. When it was first released, Wolf was reported to have sold more than a thousand uppers in one day.

== Accessories ==
The T91 has a MIL-STD-1913 picatinny rail on the top of the receiver, handguard, and the front-sight block. The standard-issue detachable handle can be removed to accommodate a variety of optical sights and scopes. There is also an M-LOK rail that is issued to some troops in addition to the testing of new options. It can also be equipped with the T85 40 mm grenade launcher to serve in a squad-level fire support role.

The Chung-Shan Institute of Science and Technology developed a T91 indoor shooting simulator for infantry marksmanship training. This equipment is capable of simulating various weather conditions, shooting distances, and wind states. For training purposes, a paintball conversion kit is also provided.

Other attachments include red dot sights and holographic weapon sights.

== Variants ==
- T91 assault rifle
- T91CQC: Barrel shortened from 406 mm (16.0 in) to 349 mm (13.7 in). Tactical rail and grip added to handguard.
- T91S: Barrel wall thickened to improve accuracy and extend shooting time. Lightweight handguard with tactical rail added in place of the original. New Magpul stock added.
- T91K1: Heavier barrel added. New handguard with tactical rail is added. UTG front grip bipod added. New Magpul MOE SL stock added.
- T91K2
- T91K3: The T91K3 features polygonal rifling which increases barrel life and improves accuracy. The 205th Arsenal and the National Defense University are jointly developing a nickel-boron finish for the bolt carriers, which would allow the weapon to fire about 10,500 rounds without any lubrication whatsoever.

== Users ==
- Bosnia and Herzegovina: 5,000 rifles
- Gambia: Unknown rifles
- Haiti: 100 rifles
- India: 1000 rifles
- Jordan: 20,000 rifles
- Kuwait: 18,000 rifles
- Taiwan: 240,000 rifles
- United Arab Emirates: 10,000 rifles

== See also ==
- Heckler & Koch HK416
