= T112 assault rifle =

Taiwanese AR-15–style rifle

T112
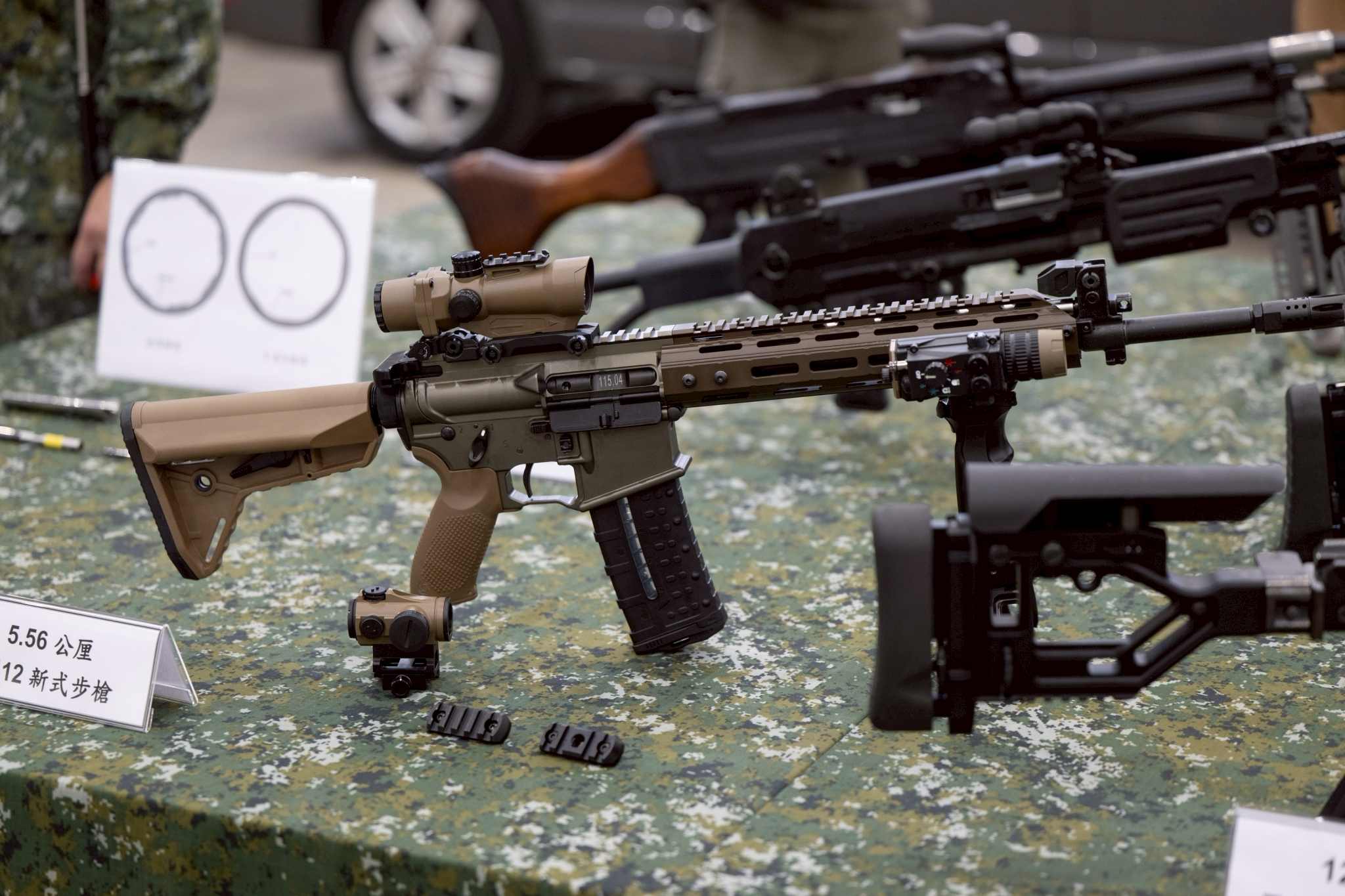
- President Lai visits the 205th Arsenal of the Armaments Bureau to inspect the members of the armed forces and displayed the T112 rifle on site in Kaohsiung on 29 May 2026
- Type: Assault rifle
- Place of origin: Taiwan

Production history
- Designed: 2020
- Manufacturer: 205th Arsenal
- Produced: 2024–present
- No. built: 25,000+

Specifications
- Mass: 3.5 kg
- Cartridge: 5.56×45mm NATO
- Action: Gas-operated, rotating bolt
- Effective firing range: 600m
- Feed system: STANAG magazine
- Sights: windage and elevation adjustments Picatinny rail can be used for mounting various optical sights

The T112 assault rifle (Chinese: T112戰鬥步槍, lit. 'T112 battle rifle') is a Taiwanese AR-15–style rifle produced by the 205th Armory. It is intended to replace the T91 assault rifle.

== History ==
The T112 debuted at the Taipei Aerospace & Defense Technology Exhibition in September 2023 at the 205th Arsenal's booth. Initial combat readiness tests were completed in November 2023. It is intended to replace the T91 assault rifle as the primary small arm of the Taiwanese armed forces.

In April 2024, the military announced that mass production was underway with an initial batch of 25,000 weapons ordered. Estimated purchase 86,114 weapons ordered. The rifle was ordered alongside a series of supporting accessories including a close combat red dot sight, 1-4x magnified optic, laser illuminator, and flashlight.

== Design ==
Unlike the T91 assault rifle, the T112 has a much more pronounced brass deflector whilst lacking a forward assist much like its predecessor.

The T112 rifle weights 3.5 kg. Chambered in 5.56×45mm NATO the T112 is rated effective out to 600 meters. In testing the T112 reportedly had a bullet spread of 9.8 centimeters at 100 meters. The upper receiver has a full length optics rail with permanent folding iron sights, the handguard has M-LOK slots. The lower receiver is ambidextrous allowing easier use by left handed shooters. It has four selector positions: safe, single, two shot burst, and full automatic.

The barrel has polygonal rifling and a new model of flash hider. Barrel life is improved from the 6,000 rounds of the T91 to 10,000 rounds. A universal bayonet mount is integrated into the upper.

== Users ==
- Taiwan
  - Republic of China Armed Forces
