= Republic of China Military Police =

Military police branch of the military of Taiwan

- 中華民國憲兵
- Emblem of the Republic of China Military Police
- Founded: 1914
- Country: Republic of China (Taiwan)
- Branch: Military police
- Size: 16,000 (2004 est.); 5,502 (2020 est.); 11,000 (2024 est.)
- Part of: National Revolutionary Army (1924–1946); Republic of China Armed Forces (since 1946)
- Garrison/HQ: Taipei, Taiwan
- Anniversaries: 12 December
- Engagements: Northern Expedition; January 28 incident; Xi'an Incident; Second Sino-Japanese War; Chinese Civil War

Commanders
- Current commander: Lieutenant-General Cheng Chen-Hsiang

Insignia
- Flag

- Emblem used

The Republic of China Military Police (ROCMP; Chinese: 中華民國憲兵; pinyin: Zhōnghuá Mínguó Xiànbīng), referred to informally as the Taiwanese Military Police is a military police force operating under the jurisdiction of the Ministry of National Defense of Republic of China (Taiwan). Unlike military police organisations in many other countries, the ROCMP functions as a distinct branch of the Republic of China Armed Forces.

The ROCMP is tasked with the protection of senior government leaders against assassination or capture, the guarding of Taiwan’s critical infrastructure and strategic facilities, and the conduct of counterintelligence operations aimed at identifying and neutralising enemy infiltrators, spies, and saboteurs.

== History ==
=== Warlord Era ===
Ku Cheng-lun was the first commander of the military police, serving from November 6, 1931 to November 1940. Under Ku, the ROCMP imitated the Japanese system. Branches were opened across the country, and an intelligence branch was created.

=== Xi'an Incident ===
During the Xi'an Incident on December 12, 1936, Zhang Xueliang's troops attacked Huaqing Pool to kidnap Chiang Kai-shek. Chiang was defended by a bodyguard company from the ROCMP 1st Regiment. The kidnappers pursued Chiang and his bodyguards into the mountains and captured him. Only three bodyguards survived. ROCMP reinforcements were interdicted by Zhang's forces. Chiang recognized the ROCMP's loyalty in 1951 by making 12 December "Military Police Day".

=== Second Sino-Japanese War ===
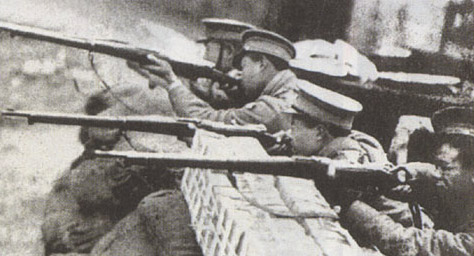
Chinese Nationalist Military Police during the January 28 Incident

During the Second Sino-Japanese War, the Military Police were often thrust into frontline combat roles for which they were neither specifically trained nor equipped. They fought fiercely during events such as the January 28 Incident of 1932 and the Battle of Nanking in 1937, suffering heavy casualties.

During the Battle of Nanking in December 1937, the 2nd Military Police Instruction Regiment (Chinese: 憲兵教導第二團) fought bravely against Japanese forces and was almost entirely wiped out. Deputy Commander of the Military Police Command, Hsiao Shan-Ling (Chinese: 蕭山令), was killed in action. Japanese accounts later revealed that captured Chinese Nationalist Military Police personnel, identifiable by their white armbands, were frequently summarily executed—a practice similar to that of the Wehrmacht’s treatment of Soviet political commissars during the Second World War. Meanwhile, members of the 2nd Special Police Unit (Chinese: 特警第二隊), operating behind enemy lines, were betrayed by collaborators, resulting in the deaths of Tu Ching-Po (Chinese: 杜靜波) and over a dozen other military police members.

In addition to frontline duties, the Military Police played a major role in operations behind Japanese lines and expanded into intelligence and counterinsurgency roles. They were instrumental in suppressing communist influence within Nationalist territory, including the quelling of an attempted uprising during the New Fourth Army Incident of 1941.

The Military Police also performed vital security duties towards the end of the war, including escorting Japanese delegates during the formal arrangements for the Surrender of Japan in 1945. By the end of the war, the Military Police had grown to include 27 regiments, three independent battalions, and three training regiments.

From September 1945, the Republic of China dispatched Military Police to Japan as part of the Allied Occupation of Japan. On 14 May 1952, the ROC Military Police detachment stationed in Tokyo, led by Captain Li Chien-Wu (Chinese: 李建武), withdrew from Japan and returned to Taiwan aboard the China Merchants Steam Navigation Company's vessel MV Hai Lung (Chinese: 海隴輪).

=== Post-War Mainland Operations ===
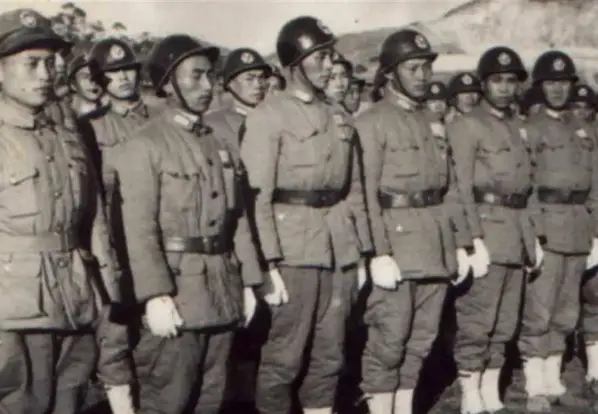
Republic of China Military Police personnel standing in formation in Nanking, circa 1946. The ROC Military Police were tasked with maintaining security in the Nationalist capital and protecting government institutions in the post-war period.

After 1945, the Military Police played a key role in post-war internal security:

- In 1946, the 9th and 16th Military Police Regiments were responsible for safeguarding the National Constituent Assembly in Nanjing.
- In 1947, the 4th and 21st Regiments were deployed to Taiwan to suppress the February 28 Incident.
- In the same year, tensions between military police and municipal police in Shanghai erupted into the July 27 Shanghai Police-Military Police Incident (Chinese: 上海警憲衝突), resulting in bloodshed and a general strike within the city’s police force.
- In 1948, the Military Police continued to provide security during the convening of the First National Assembly.

As the Chinese Civil War intensified, the Military Police maintained a primarily internal security role, guarding key government facilities and protecting senior political leaders. The 7th Company of the 1st Regiment notably participated in the Battle of Kuningtou in Kinmen in 1949, successfully resisting communist landings.

=== Taiwan Period ===
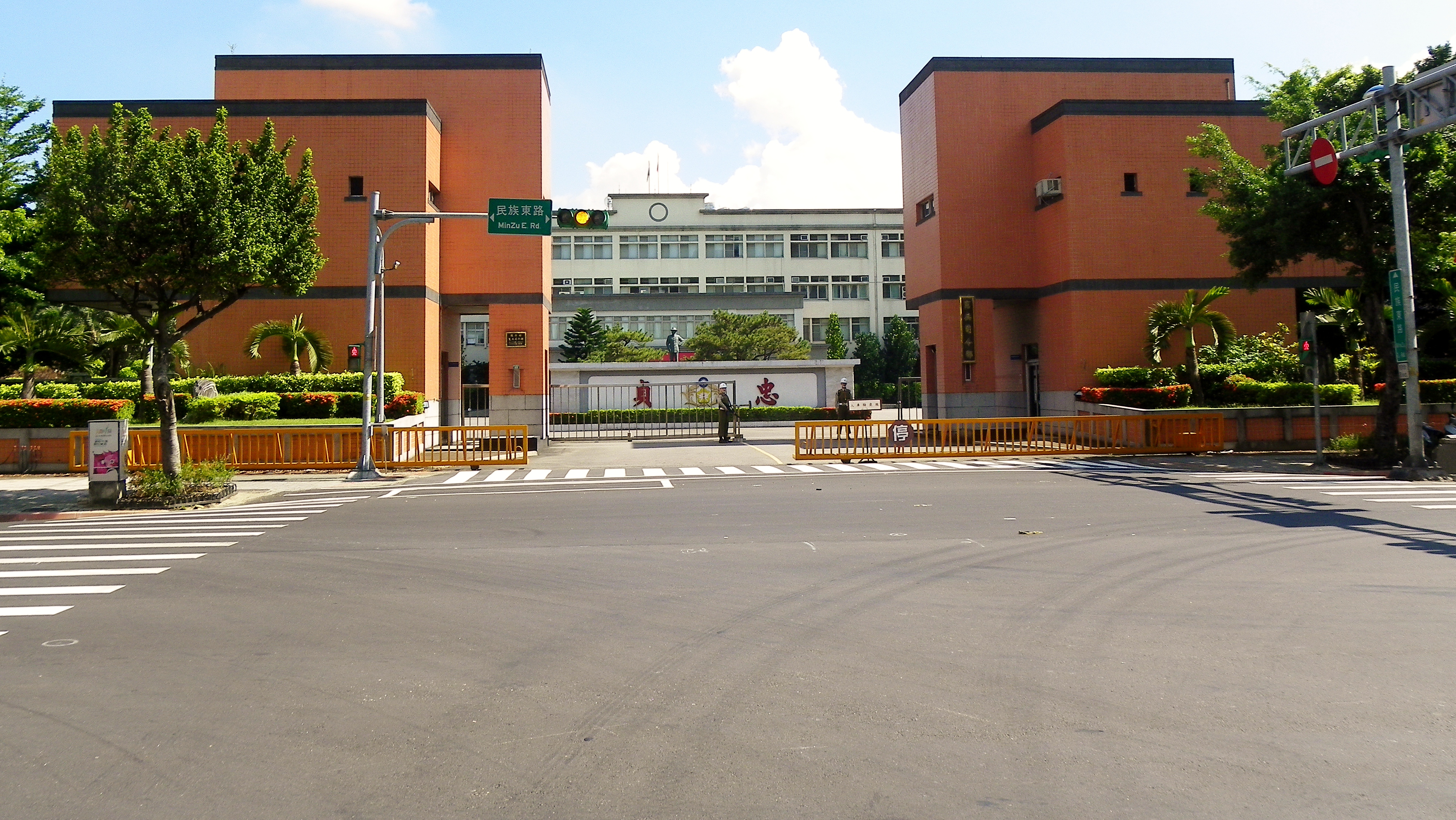
Headquarters of the ROC Military Police in Taipei

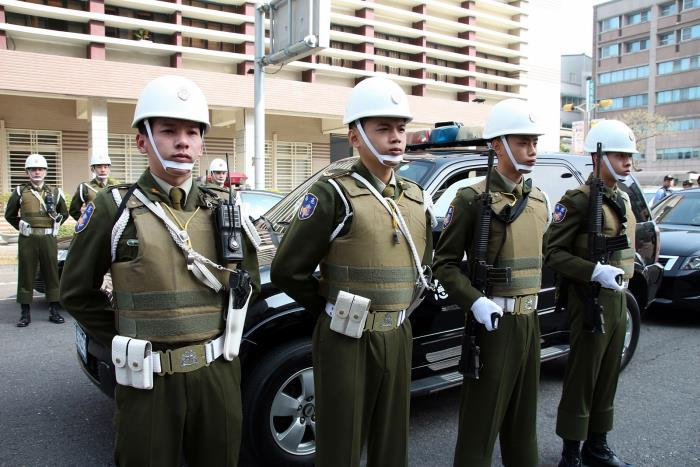
MPs participating in the 2014 Chun-an Programme (春安工作), an annual security task around Lunar New Year

Following the Nationalist retreat to Taiwan in 1949, the ROCMP was reconstituted. On 1 March 1950, the Southeastern Command Post (Chinese: 憲兵司令部東南指揮所) of the ROC Military Police was reorganised into the Military Police Headquarters (Chinese: 憲兵司令部), on Liangzhou Street, Taipei.

Officers and troops from the 1st, 3rd, and 18th Military Police Regiments evacuated from mainland China were integrated with the 4th and 8th Regiments already stationed in Taiwan. This reorganisation led to the establishment of new units, including the 1st, 4th, 7th, 8th, and 9th Regiments, as well as a cadre training class, special services battalion, communications unit, military band, and a high-security intelligence group.

During the early 1950s, ROCMP forces were also involved in overseas operations. In 1954, a detachment was deployed to Korea to retrieve and repatriate over 14,000 Chinese anti-communist exiles following the Korean War, an operation commemorated as "123 Freedom Day".

Throughout the 1950s and 1960s, the Military Police Command expanded. In 1955, it played a central role in the controversial arrest and detention of over 300 former subordinates of General Sun Li-jen during the "Sun Li-jen Incident", part of the wider White Terror political purges.

In 1970, under the advice of the United States Military Assistance Advisory Group, a major reorganisation took place. Regimental structures were converted into regional commands:

- 201st Regional Command: Presidential Guard, derived from the 101st MP Regiment.
- 202nd Regional Command: Capital garrison, from the former 201st MP Regiment.
- 203rd Regional Command: Based in Miaoli County.
- 204th Regional Command: Based in Tainan City.

The Military Police School was relocated to Wugu Township (now Wugu District, New Taipei City) in 1975. In the late 1970s and early 1980s, through various Ching An (Chinese: 靖安) projects, the ROCMP expanded further by absorbing special forces and former security battalions, leading to the creation of additional regiments and specialist units, including the Military Police Special Service Company (MPSSC) established in 1977.

The 1980s and 1990s saw ongoing modernisation and rationalisation, including:

- Establishment of the Armoured Military Police Battalion (1986).
- Transfer of coastal and port security duties to the Coast Guard, with several MP battalions reassigned accordingly (1993–1999).
- Full absorption of Air Force security battalions into ROCMP command (2006, under "Project Peace").

In 2013, following restructuring within the Ministry of National Defence, the Military Police Command was renamed the Ministry of National Defence General Staff Headquarters - Military Police Command (Chinese: 國防部參謀本部憲兵指揮部). Area commands such as the 203rd–205th saw command ranks adjusted. And from 2021, the Command post became renamed as the Ministry of National Defence - Military Police Command (Chinese: 國防部憲兵指揮部)), with its commander maintaining lieutenant general rank.

The ROCMP also underwent further streamlining:

- In 2014, the Military Police School was renamed the Military Police Training Centre.
- In 2016, the "White Terror" concerns were reignited following an illegal search operation in Taipei conducted by the 202nd Command under the Political Warfare Bureau’s directives, leading to widespread public outrage and subsequent disciplinary action against senior officers.
- In 2021, with reforms under the National Defence Act amendments, the ROCMP was directly subordinated to the Ministry of National Defence.

Most recently, in 2024, new battalions (261st–264th) were established to reinforce the defence of Taipei, each battalion comprising five companies and approximately 673 personnel per unit, significantly bolstering the capital’s wartime and peacetime security posture.

== Functions ==
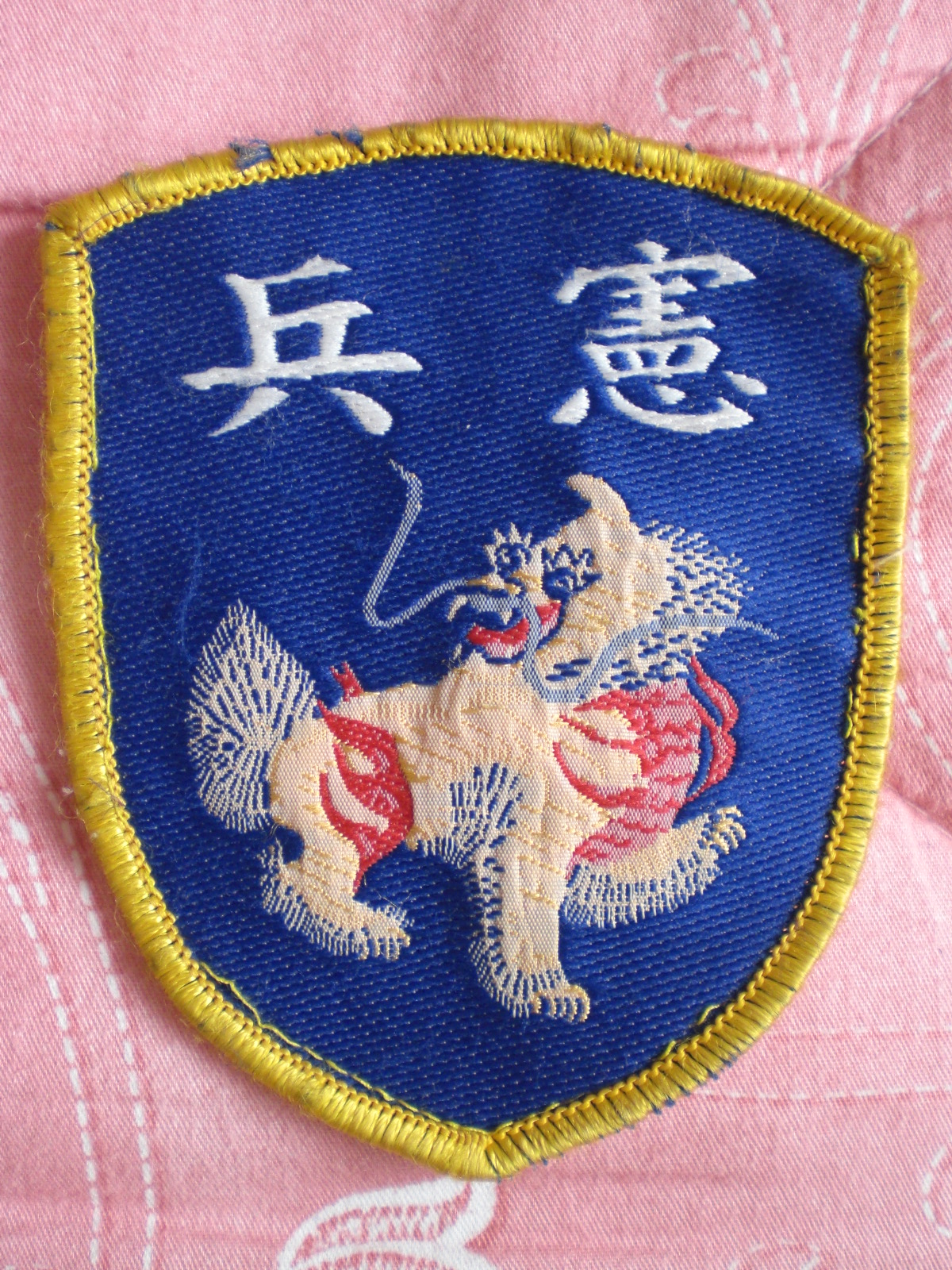
The insignia of ROCMP

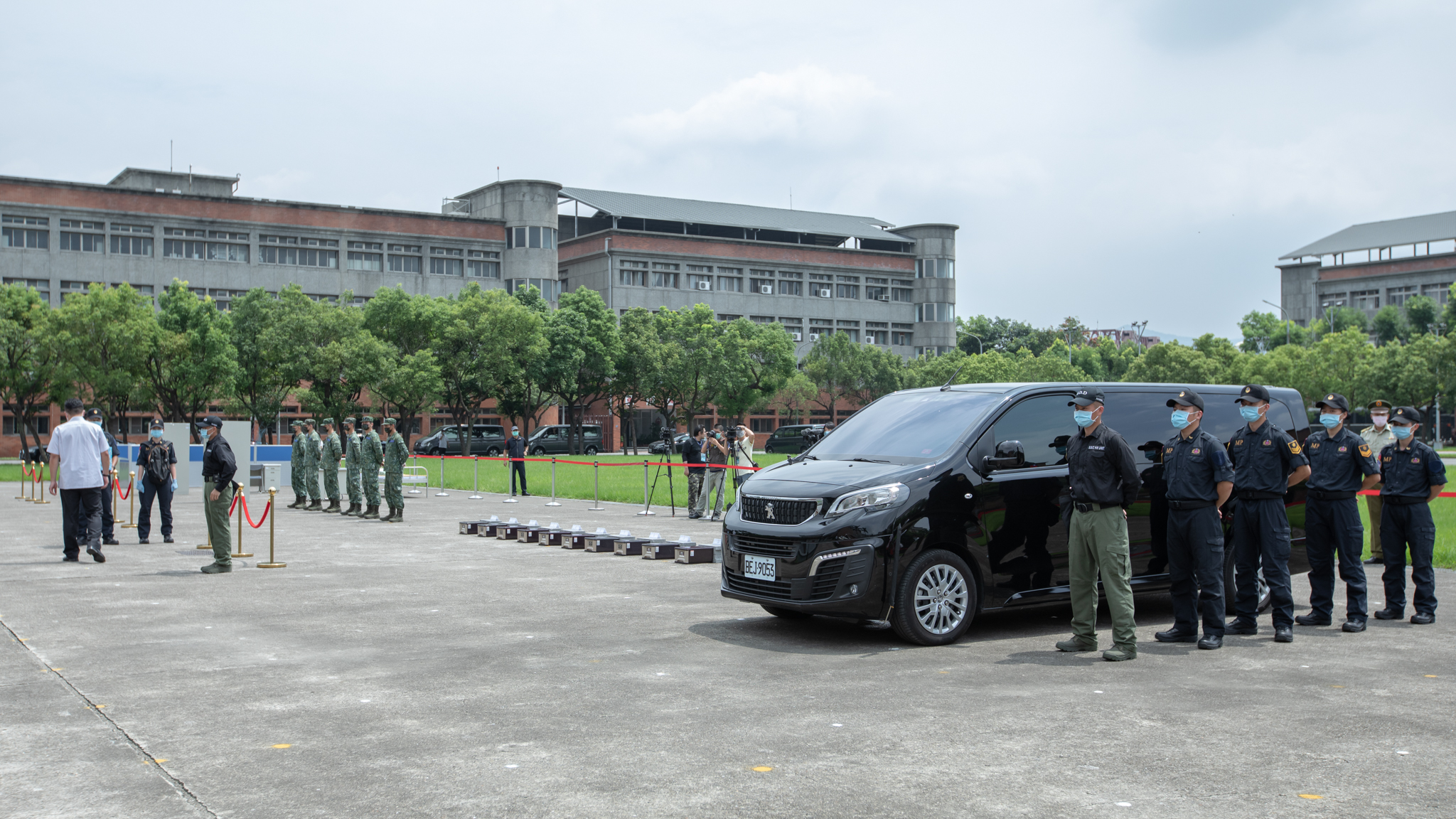
ROCMP anti-drug unit

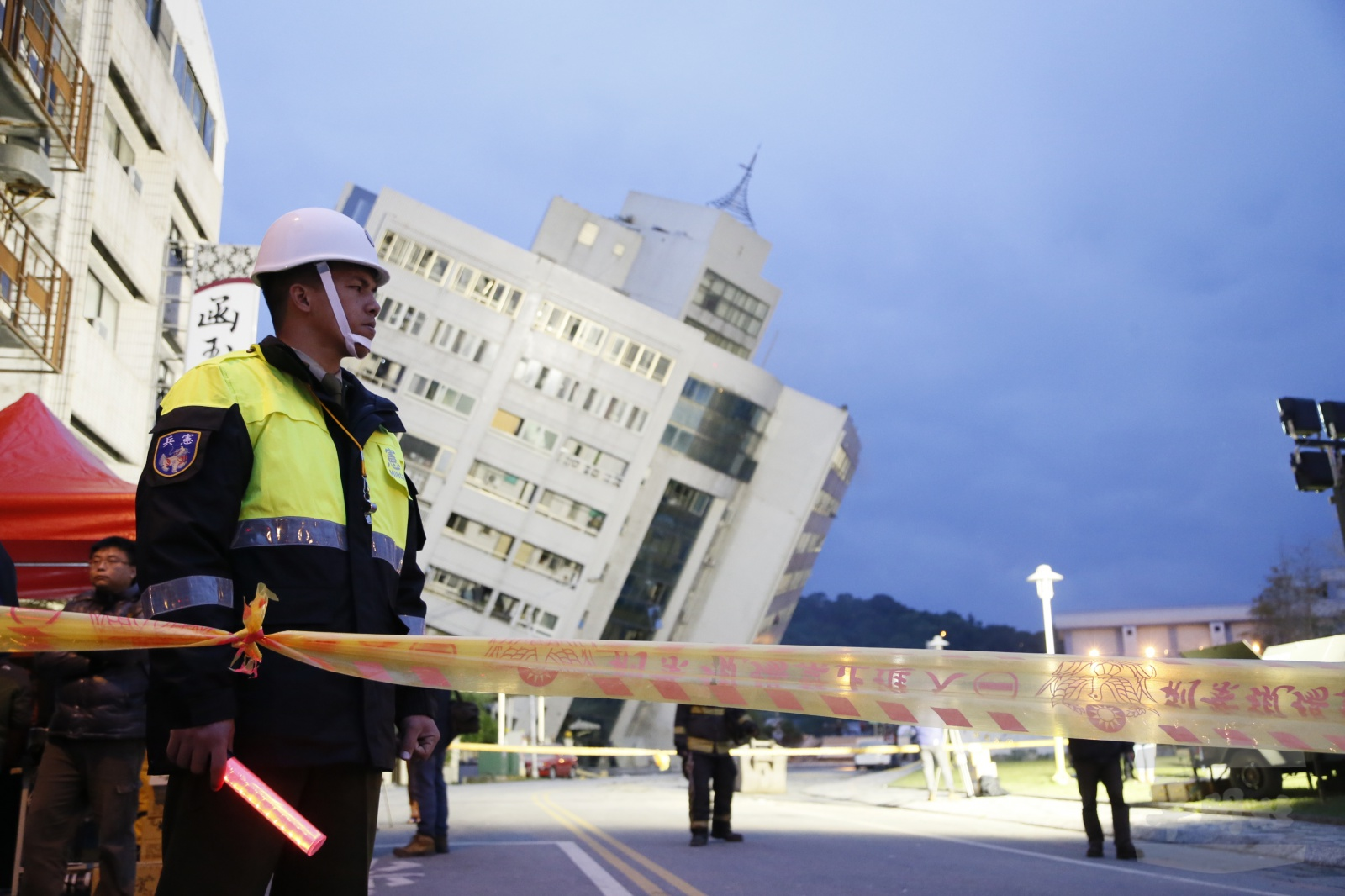
MPs on disaster response duty

=== Functions ===
According to the 2006 National Defense Report, the Republic of China Military Police (ROCMP) is tasked with the following responsibilities:

1. Military Functions
  1. Conducting special security duties, including presidential protection.
  2. Undertaking counter-terrorism operations.
  3. Providing garrison security.
  4. Enforcing military discipline.
  5. Supporting broader military operations.
2. Supportive Functions in Civilian Affairs
  1. Executing military justice and law enforcement missions.
  2. Maintaining public security.
  3. Providing effective support for regional disaster prevention and response efforts.
  4. Contributing to the maintenance of social stability and national security.

=== Military ===
The Republic of China Military Police (ROCMP) is responsible for enforcing military law, maintaining military discipline, and providing manpower support to the civilian police force. In times of emergency, ROCMP units are tasked with performing combat duties. They are also responsible for securing key government facilities, including the Presidential Office Building, and for conducting counter-terrorism operations and VIP protection missions. Furthermore, the ROCMP plays a crucial role in the defence of Taipei, the capital city and political and financial centre of the Republic of China.

=== Intelligence ===
Due to historical and traditional factors, the Republic of China Military Police (ROCMP) continues to undertake intelligence missions across six categories of security investigations:

- Special services related to presidential security and protection
- Political investigations
- Military investigations
- Criminal investigations
- Foreign affairs
- Social order

These investigations are primarily conducted by regional investigation groups, the Mobile Investigation Group, and their superior body, the Intelligence Division of the Military Police Command. Although covering a broad range of areas, the primary focus remains on special services for presidential security and protection, with the practical objective of meeting the requirements of the Commander-in-Chief, the President of the Republic of China. In carrying out its intelligence activities, the ROCMP operates under the supervision and coordination of the National Security Bureau within the National Security Council.

=== Law Enforcement ===
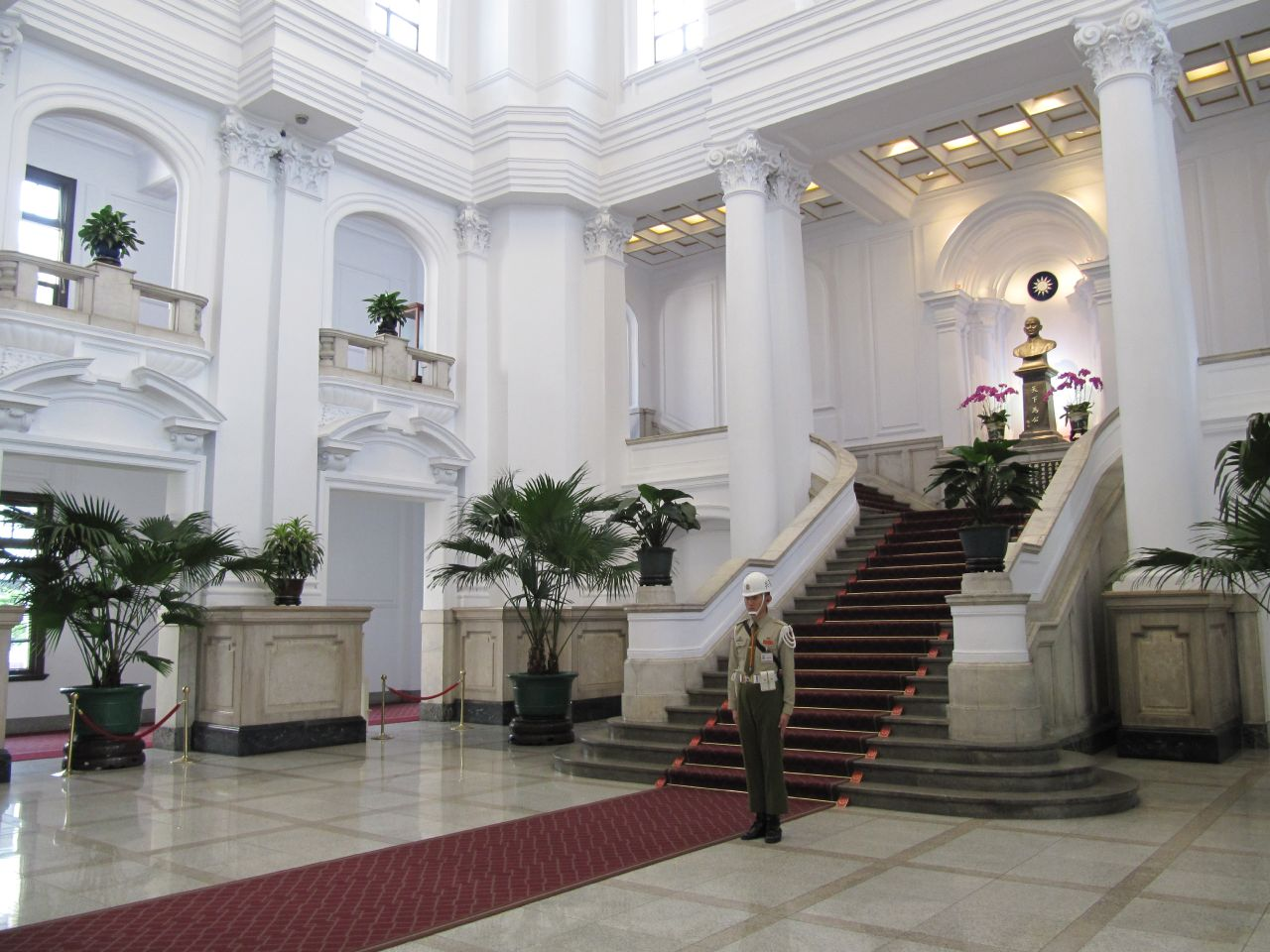
The main staircase in the Presidential Office Building being guarded by a Republic of China Military Policeman

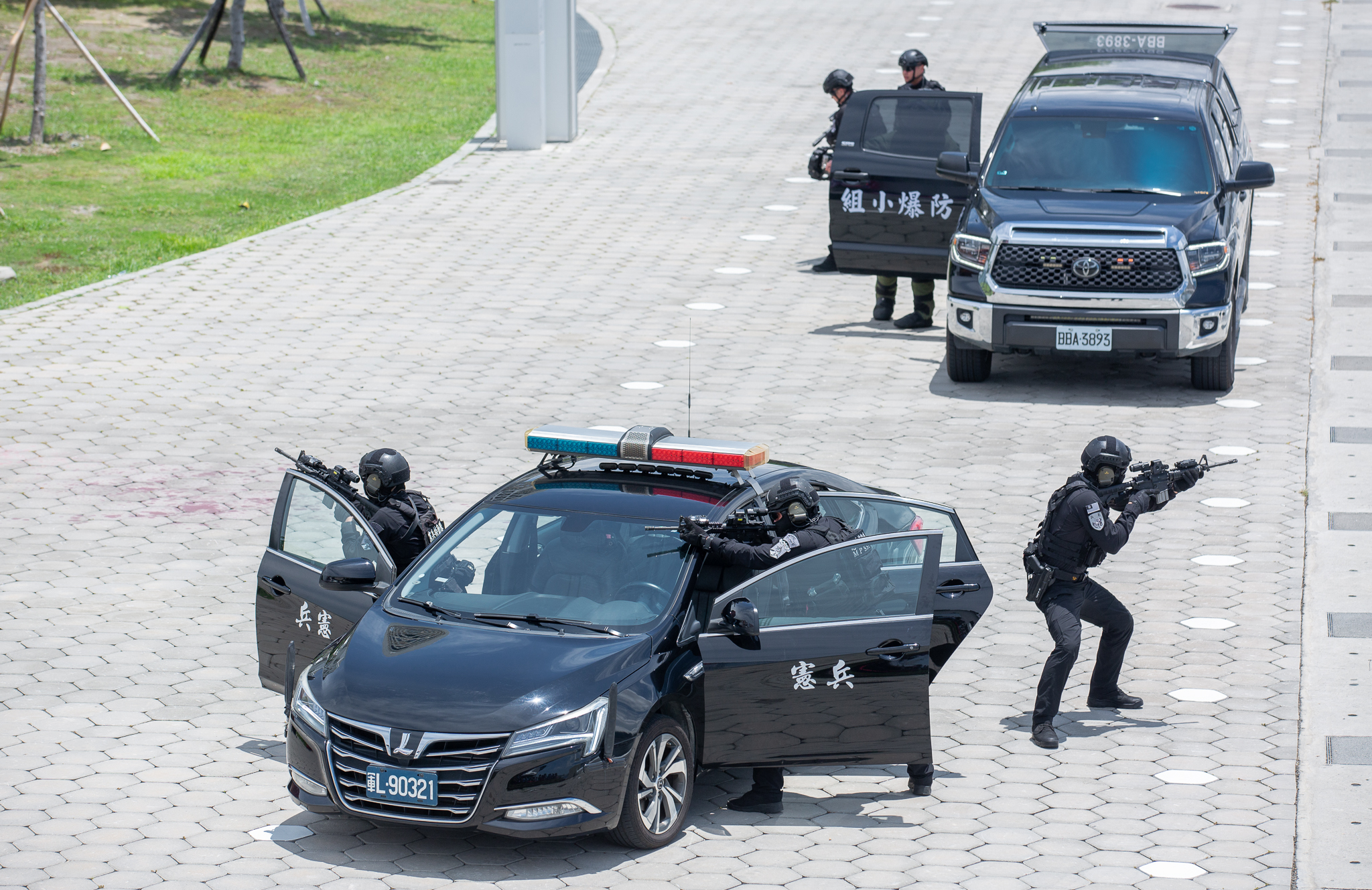
ROC Military Police Special Forces during a counter-terrorism exercise.

Under Clause 2, Section 1 of Articles 229, 230, and 231 of the Criminal Procedure Code of the ROC, commissioned officers, non-commissioned officers, and enlisted personnel of the Military Police Corps are authorised to assist public prosecutors, or to act under their command, in the investigation of criminal activities. In effect, the ROC Criminal Procedure Code grants judicial police authority to Security Military Police units within regional Military Police commands, placing them in a similar role to civilian police forces when conducting criminal investigations.

Prior to the establishment and expansion of specialised mobile police forces in the ROC, Military Police units served as the principal force responsible for suppressing serious criminal activities, violent incidents, and frequent societal unrest or riots. Even today, Military Police personnel continue to collaborate closely with district public prosecutor offices, playing a key role in maintaining law and order across Taiwanese society.

Due to the frequent rotation of military personnel and the system of conscription in Taiwan, regional Military Police units typically maintain fewer close ties to local communities compared to civilian police departments. Furthermore, unlike local police, Military Police units are not administratively accountable to elected local officials. In cases involving sensitive issues such as prostitution or human trafficking, Military Police are often preferred by public prosecutors at all levels, as their operations are perceived to result in less information leakage and reduced political interference.

In fugitive recovery operations, public prosecutors occasionally mobilise Military Police forces to conduct large-scale search and arrest missions. Their ability to deploy disciplined, sizeable, and relatively independent manpower makes them an effective tool for handling major security challenges.

== Organisation ==
=== Republic of China Military Police Command ===
The Republic of China Military Police Command (中華民國國防部憲兵指揮部) oversees all Military Police units and operations. It is subordinate to the Armed Forces General Staff, the Minister of National Defense, and ultimately to the President of the Republic of China.

The command structure includes internal departments responsible for political warfare, unit inspection, personnel management, intelligence, operations, logistics, and communications. It directly supervises the following units and divisions:

- Military Police School (zh-tw:憲兵學校)
- Military Police Regional Command (four commands) (指揮部)
  - Military Police Armoured Battalion (裝甲憲兵營)
  - Artillery Battalion (砲兵營)
  - Military Police Battalions (19 battalions) (憲兵營)
  - Military Police Security Squadrons of the Air Force (10 squadrons) (空軍警衛憲兵中隊): Specialised in securing air bases and airfields.
  - Naval Military Police Security Battalions (2 battalions) (海軍警衛憲兵營): Tasked with the protection of naval bases.
  - Regional Military Police Offices (22 offices) (憲兵隊): Battalion-sized units stationed in urban areas.
    - Regional Military Police Investigation Groups (憲兵調查組): Administratively part of the corresponding regional office, but operationally under the Intelligence Division (G2) of the Military Police Command.
- Forensic Science Centre (zh-tw:刑事鑑識中心)
  - Chemical Forensic Division (化學鑑識組)
  - Physical Forensic Division (物理鑑識組)
  - Crime Scene Investigation Division (現場勘查組)
- Military Police Special Services Company (MPSSC) (zh-tw:憲兵特勤隊): Code-named Night Hawk (夜鷹). This elite unit is stationed in Wugu, Taipei. Information regarding its operations remains classified by the Ministry of National Defense. The unit was formally established in 1978.
- Xindian Military Prison, New Taipei City (臺北新店軍事監獄)
- Lioujia Military Prison, Tainan City (臺南六甲軍事監獄)

== Ranks ==
Officers

Rank group	General / flag officers		Senior officers			Junior officers
Republic of China Military Police
Republic of China Military Police	中將; Zhōngjiàng	少將; Shàojiàng	上校; Shàngxiào	中校; Zhōngxiào	少校; Shàoxiào	上尉; Shàngwèi	中尉; Zhōngwèi	少尉; Shàowèi

Enlisted

Rank group	Senior NCOs					Junior NCOs		Enlisted
Republic of China Military Police
Republic of China Military Police	一等士官長; Yīděng shìguānzhǎng	二等士官長; Èrděng shìguānzhǎng	三等士官長; Sānděng shìguānzhǎng	上士; Shàngshì	中士; Zhōngshì	下士; Xiàshì	上等兵; Shàngděngbīng	一等兵; Yīděngbīng	二等兵; Èrděngbīng

== Banners ==
Gendarmerie regiment-level unit flag (1934～1935)

Gendarmerie regiment-level unit flag (1935～1953)

Gendarmerie regiment-level unit flag (1953～1961)

Military police unit flag (1961～1964)

Military police unit flag (1964～1986)

Military police unit flag (1986～current)

== Equipment ==
=== Vehicles ===
Model	Origin
AM General Humvee	United States
CM-32/CM-33 armoured vehicle	Republic of China
CM-34 armoured vehicle	Republic of China
Indian Challenger	United States
V-150 APC	United States
Toyota Hilux	Japan
Toyota Tundra	United States
Tesla Model 3	United States
Mercedes-Benz AMG C43 Cabriolet	Germany
Mercedes-Benz Atego	Germany
Volkswagen Transporter	Germany
Volkswagen Crafter	Germany
Škoda Superb	Czech Republic
Škoda Kodiaq	Czech Republic
Peugeot Traveller	France

=== Small arms ===
Model	Origin
AT4	Sweden
M2 QCB .50 heavy machine gun	United States
M24 Sniper Weapon System	United States
Mk 153 SMAW	United States
Mk 19 grenade launcher	United States
T74 machine gun	Republic of China
T75 Light machine gun	Republic of China
T75 pistols	Republic of China
T-77 Submachine gun	Republic of China
T-85 grenade launcher	Republic of China
T91 assault rifle	Republic of China
T93	Republic of China
M14 Made under license as the Type 57	Republic of China

=== Fire support ===
Model	Origin
M120 120 mm mortar	United States
T-75 60mm mortar	Republic of China
Kestrel (rocket launcher)	Republic of China

=== Gallery ===
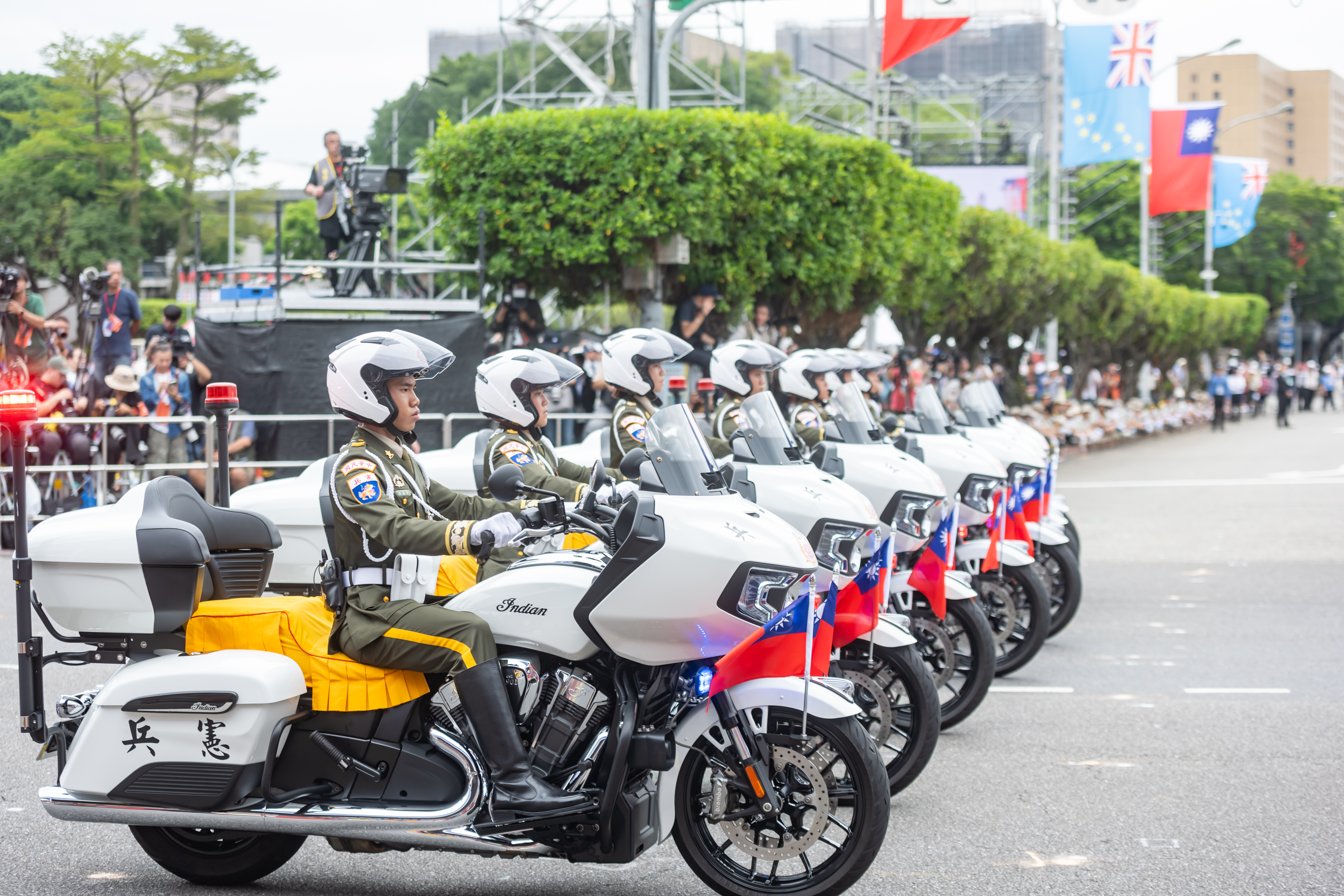
Indian Challenger

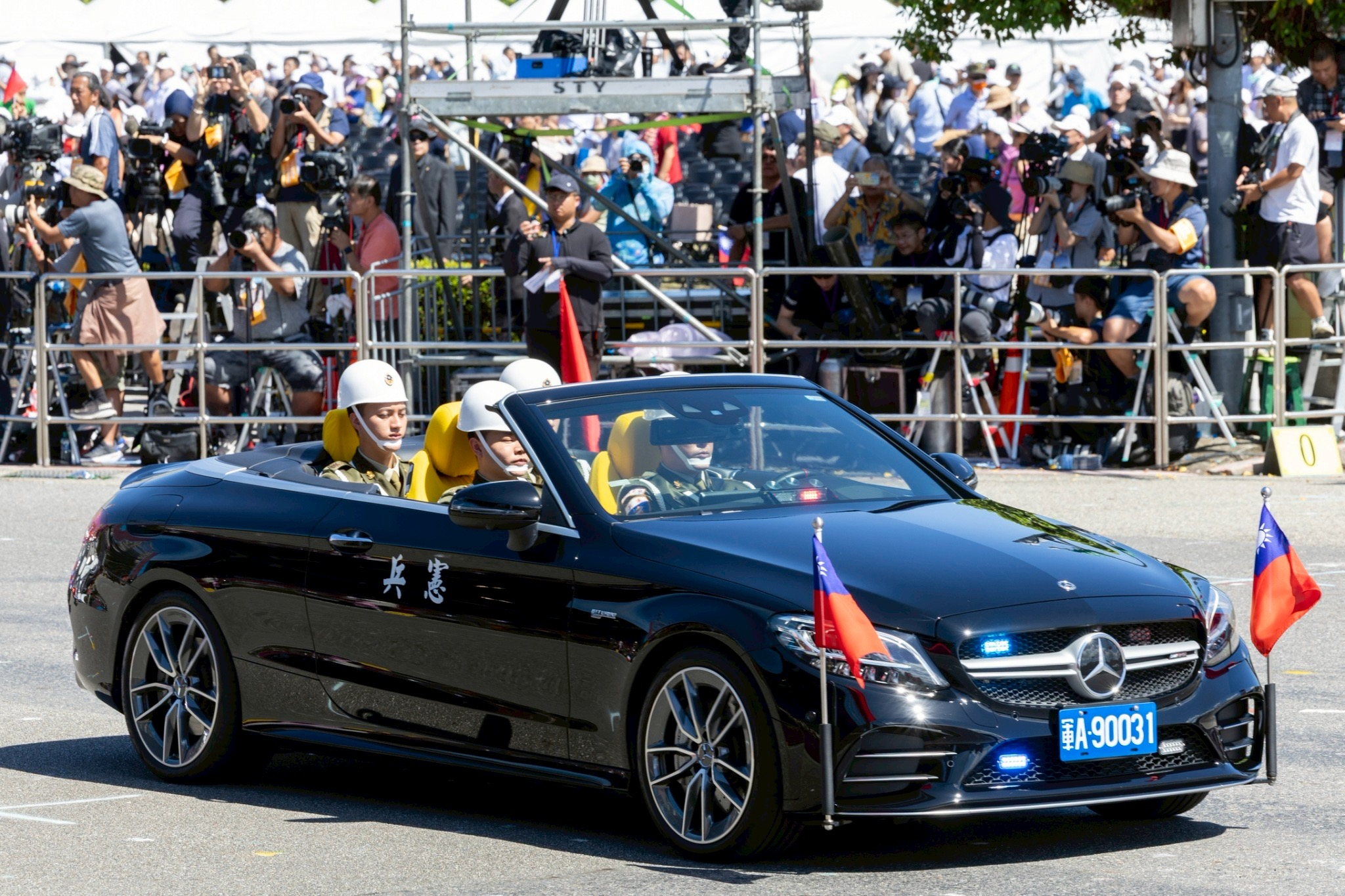
Mercedes-AMG C43

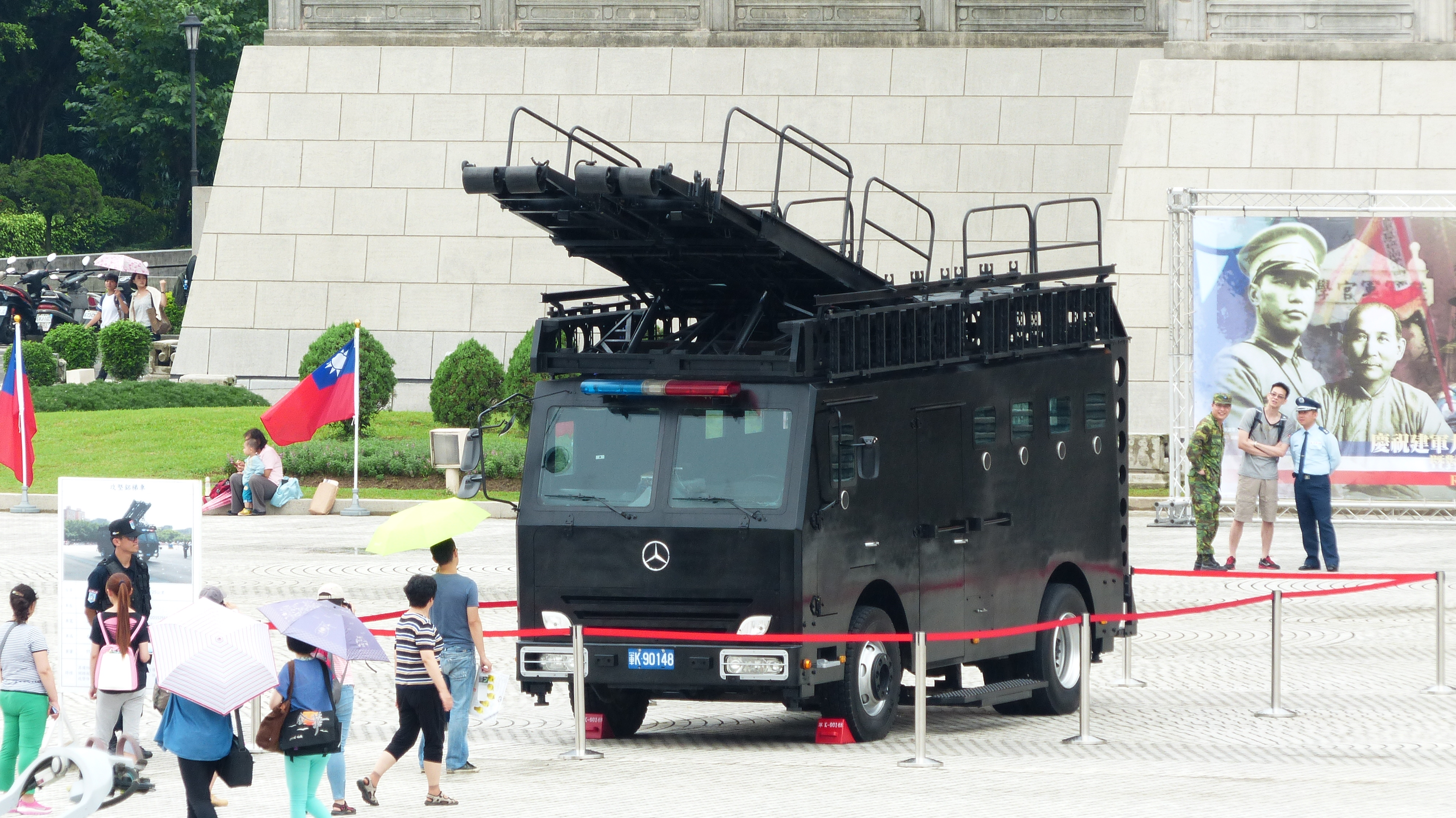
Assault Ladder Truck

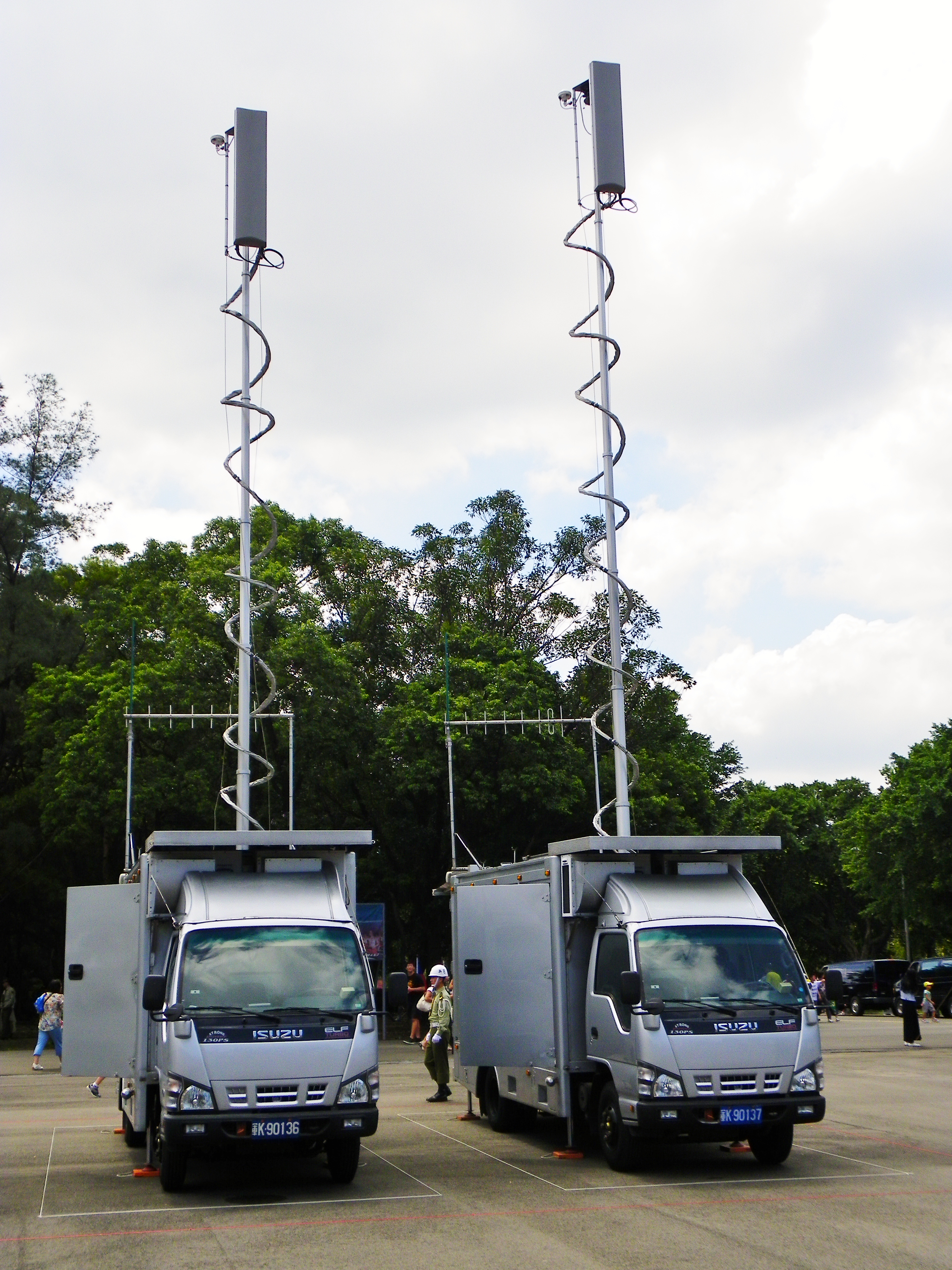
Command Communication Trunk Trucks

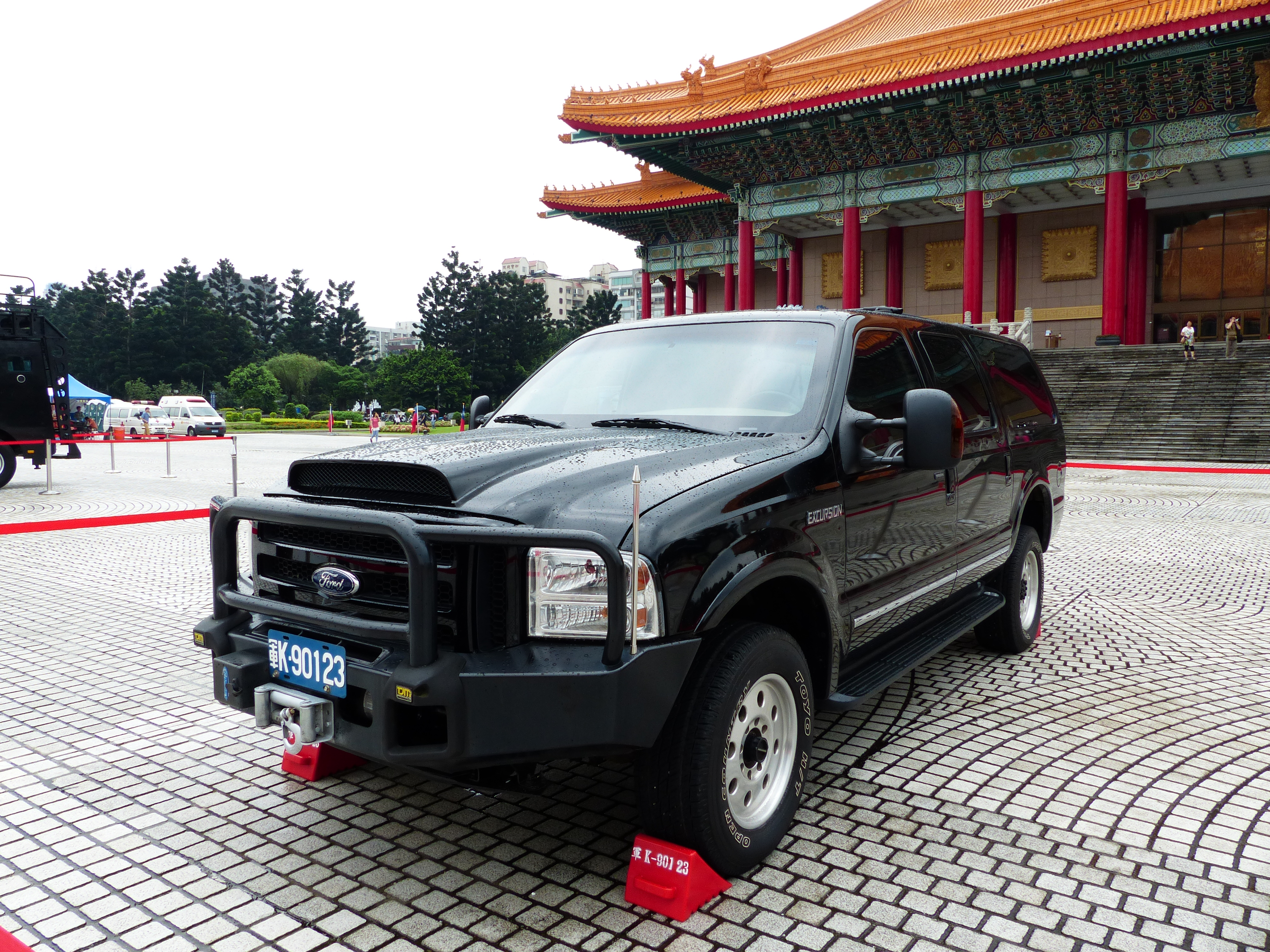
Ford Excursion limited Armored Car

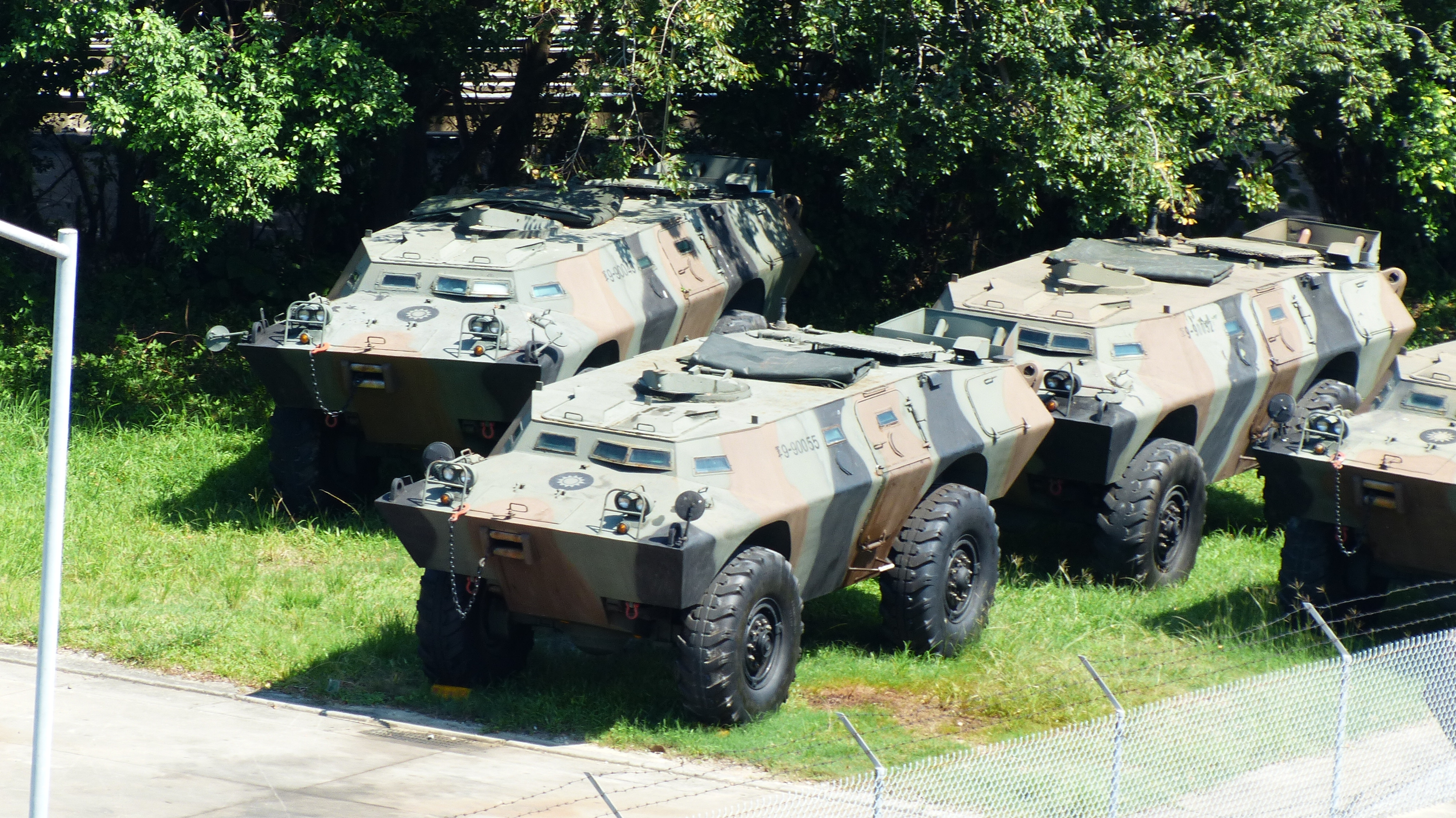
V-150s Commando Armored Cars

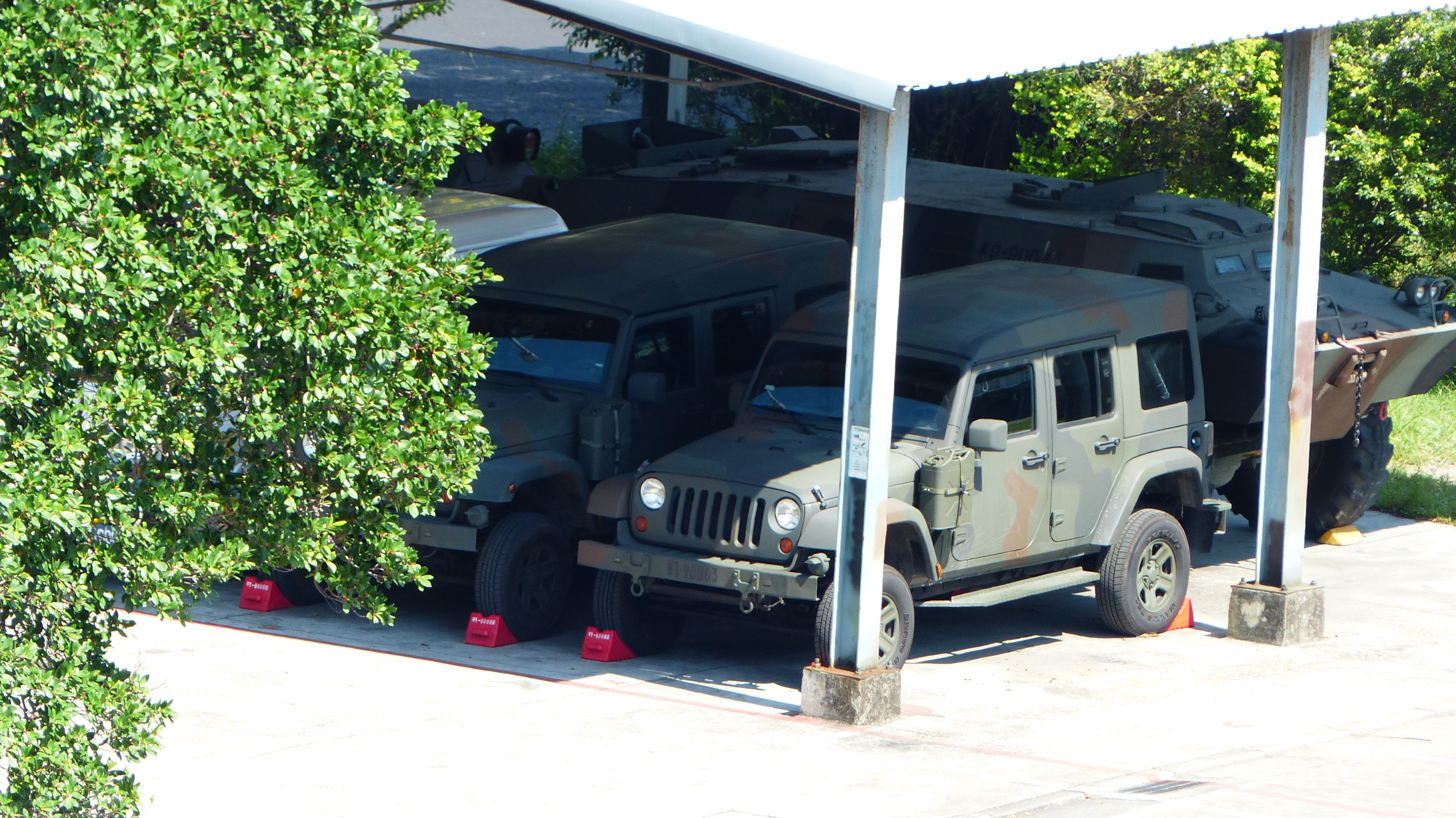
ROC Military Police Military Light Tactical Vehicles and V-150s Commando

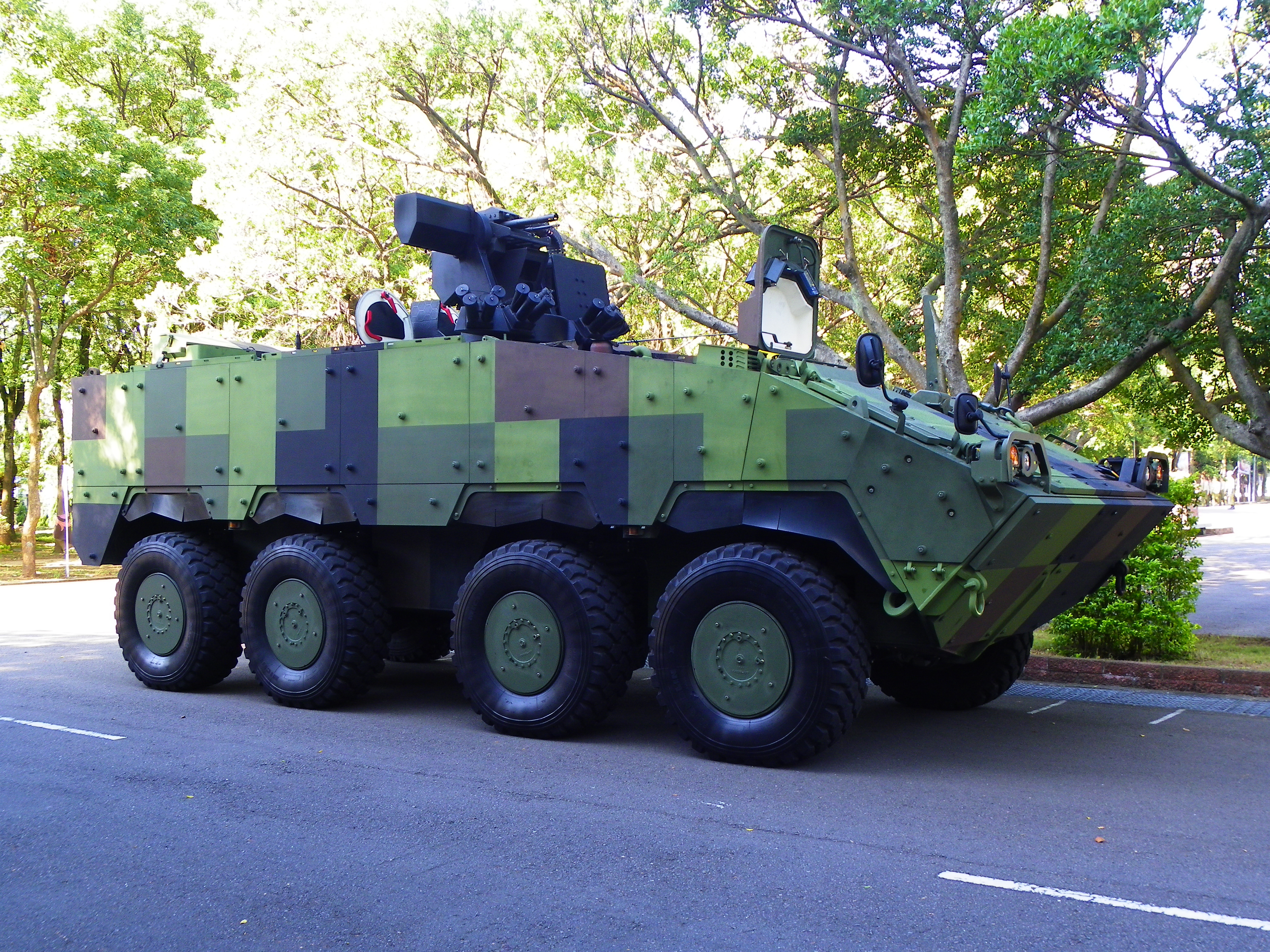
CM-32 in Military Police School

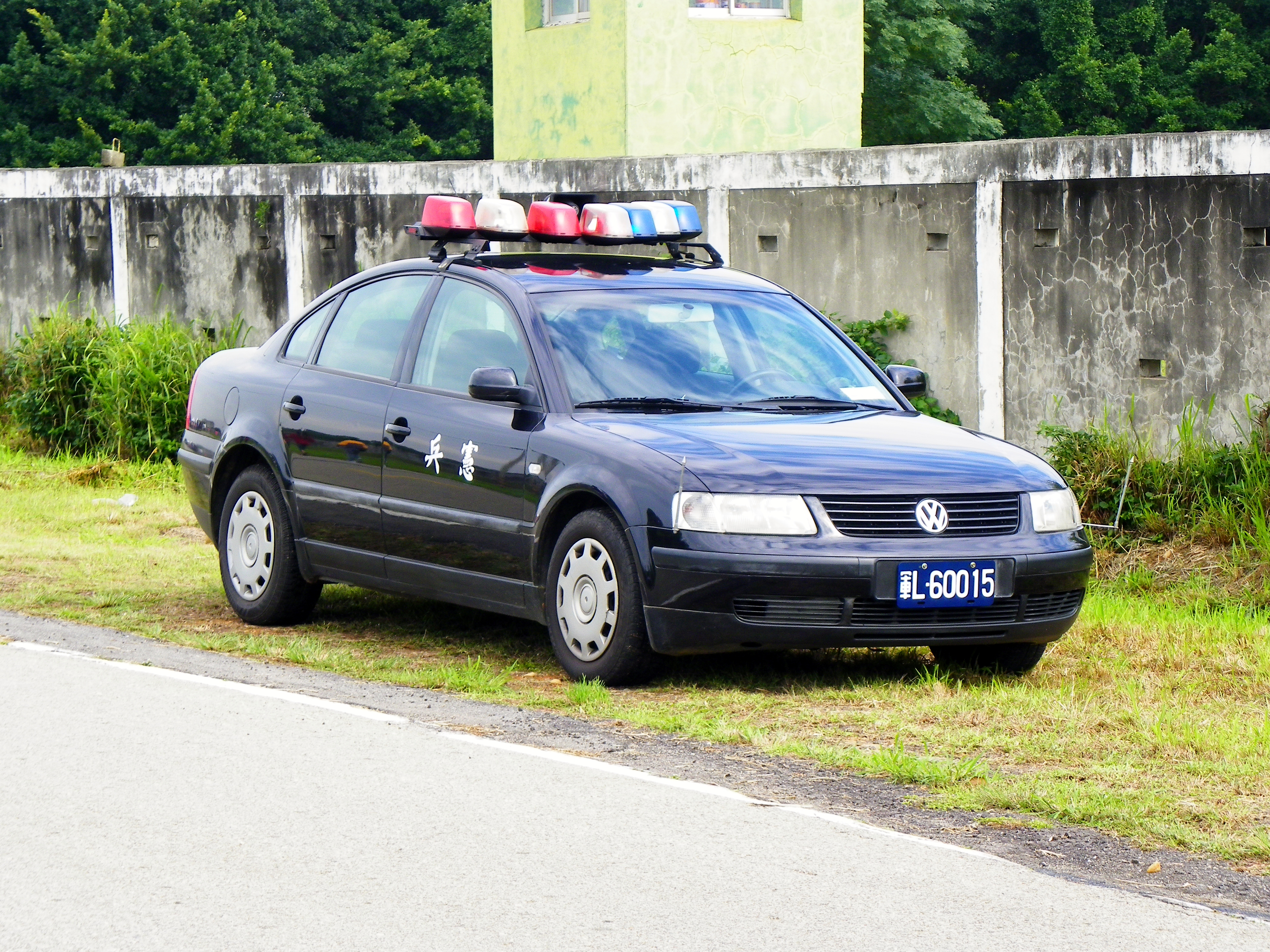
Volkswagen Passat (B5) patrol car (Retired)

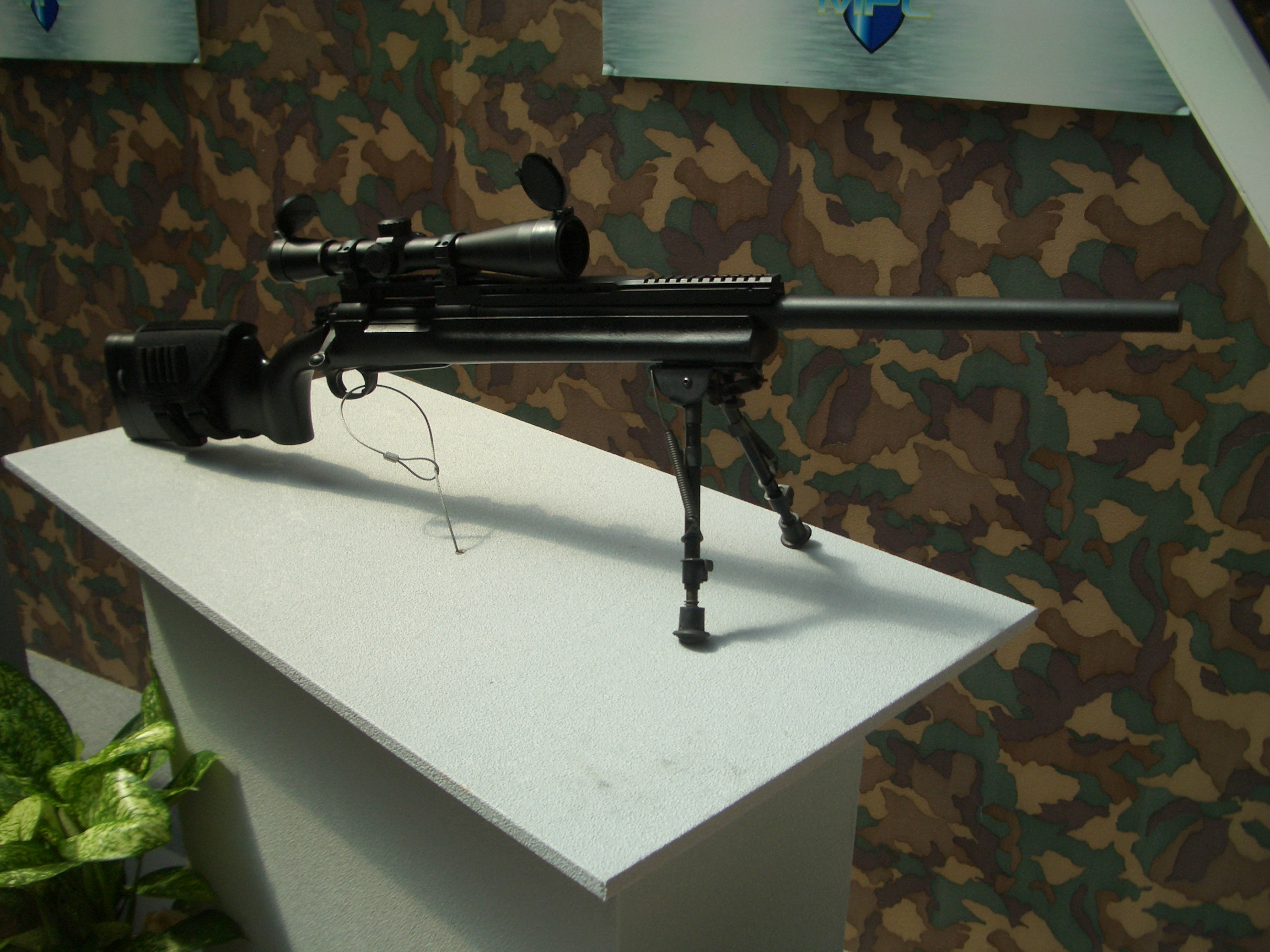
T93 sniper rifle

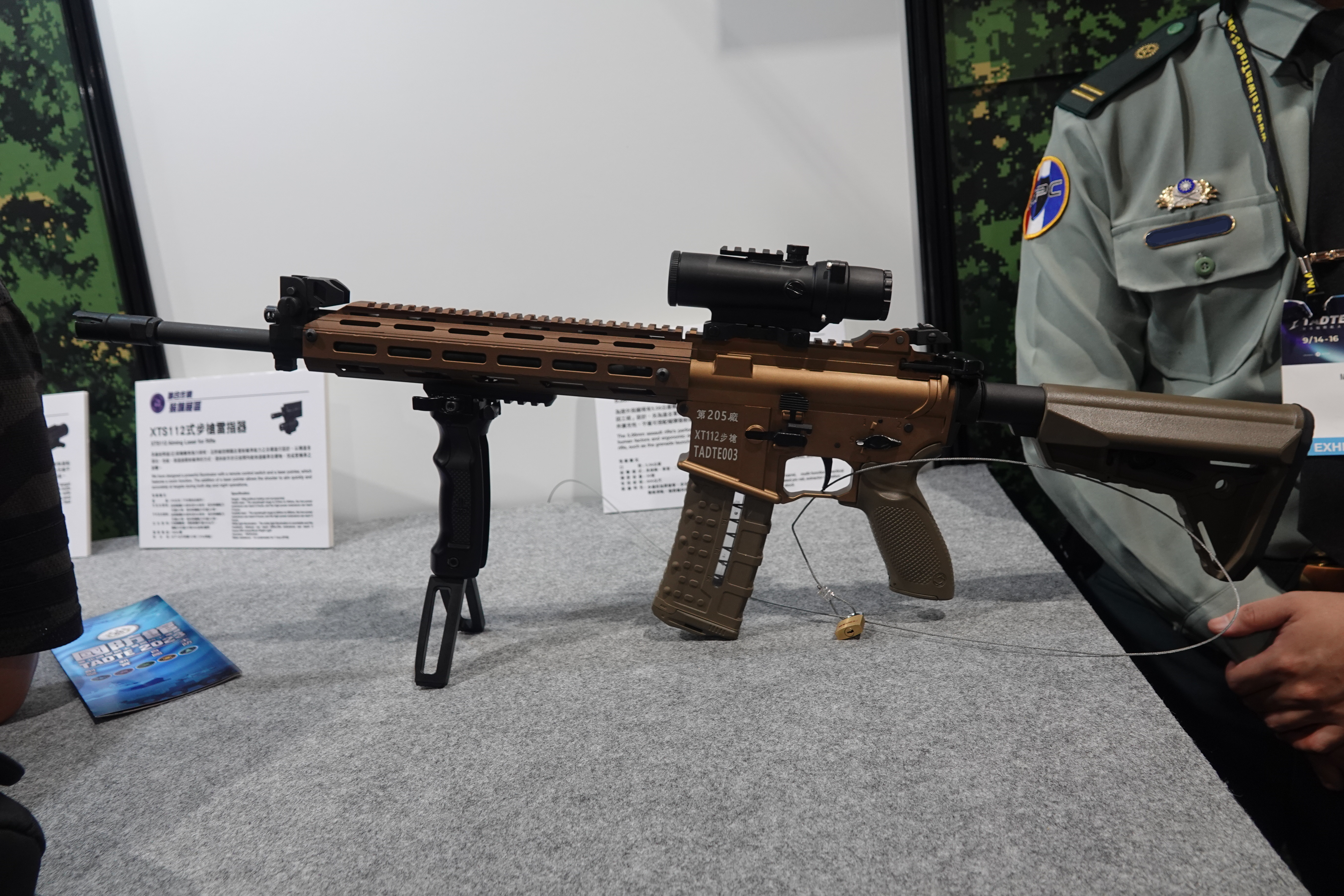
T112 assault rifle

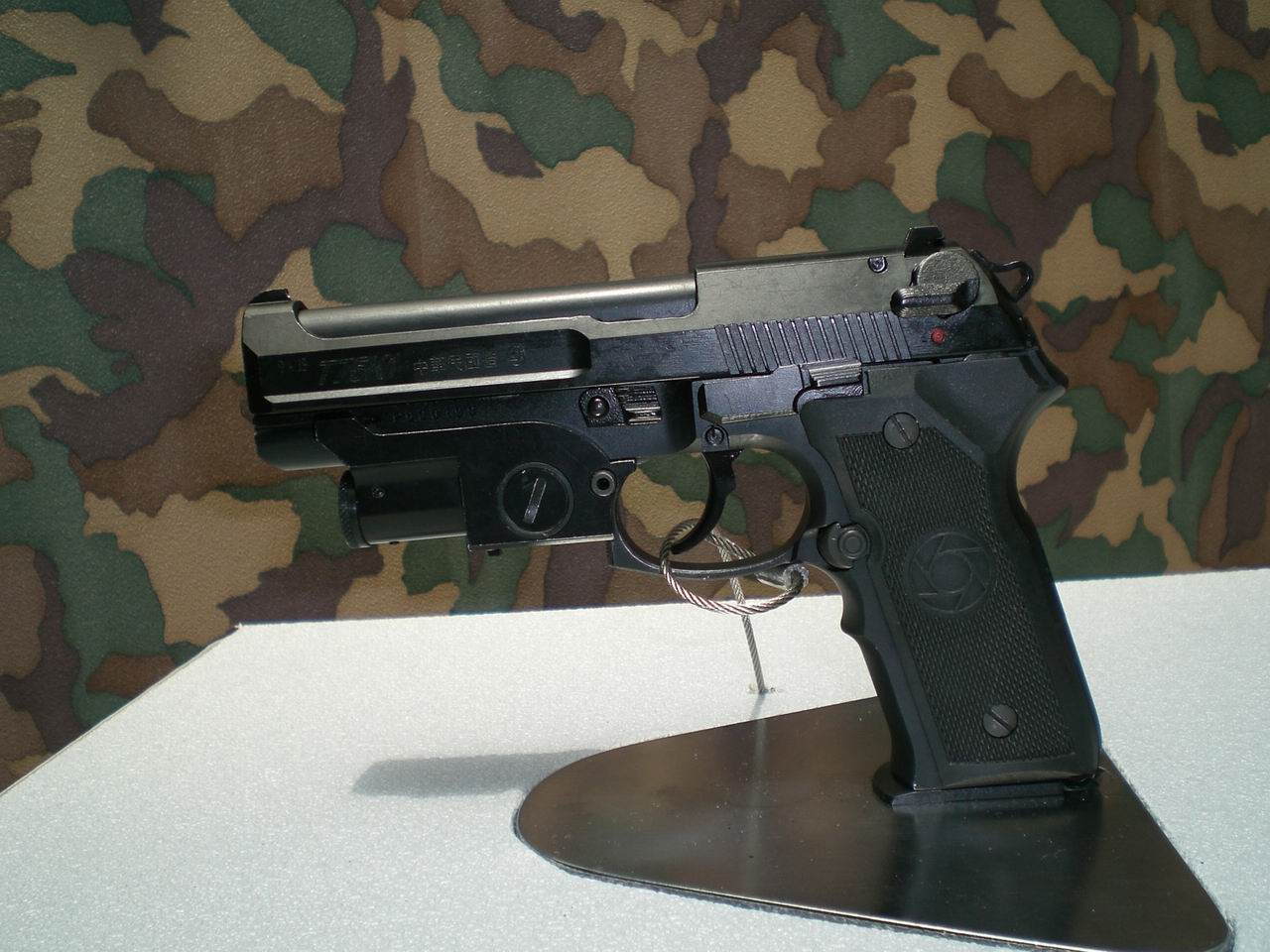
T75K1 pistol

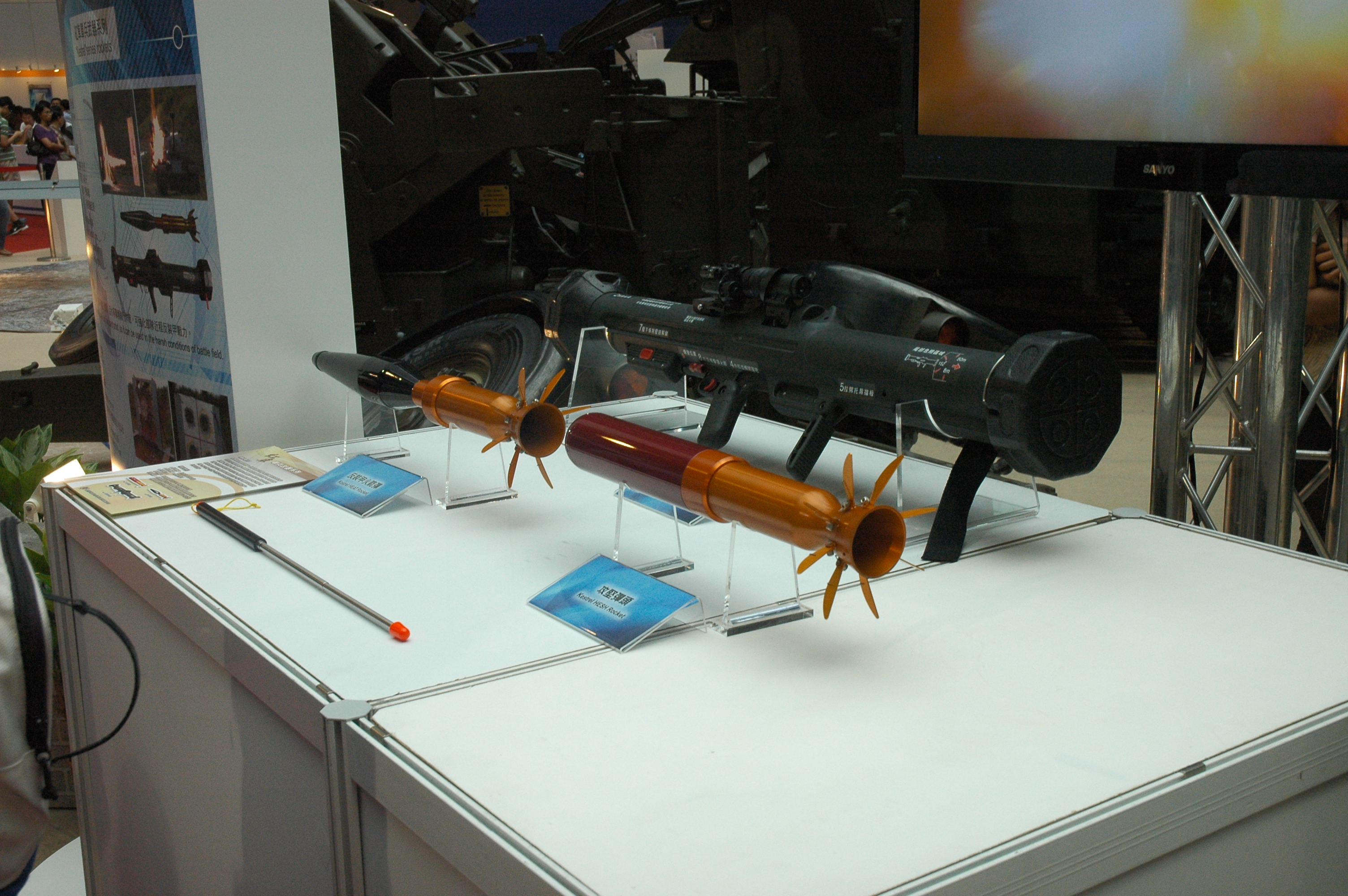
Kestrel rocket launcher

== See also ==
- People's Armed Police
- Military Police Corps (United States)
- Military Intelligence Bureau

== Sources ==
- 陶仁义 (2017). "谷正伦：宪兵之父 绥靖甘黔" [Gu Zhenglun: Father of Military Police and Pacifying Gansu and Guizhou]. 文史天地 [Literature and History] (in Simplified Chinese) (11). CORE: 81–84.
