= T93 sniper rifle =

7.62 mm T93 Sniper Rifle
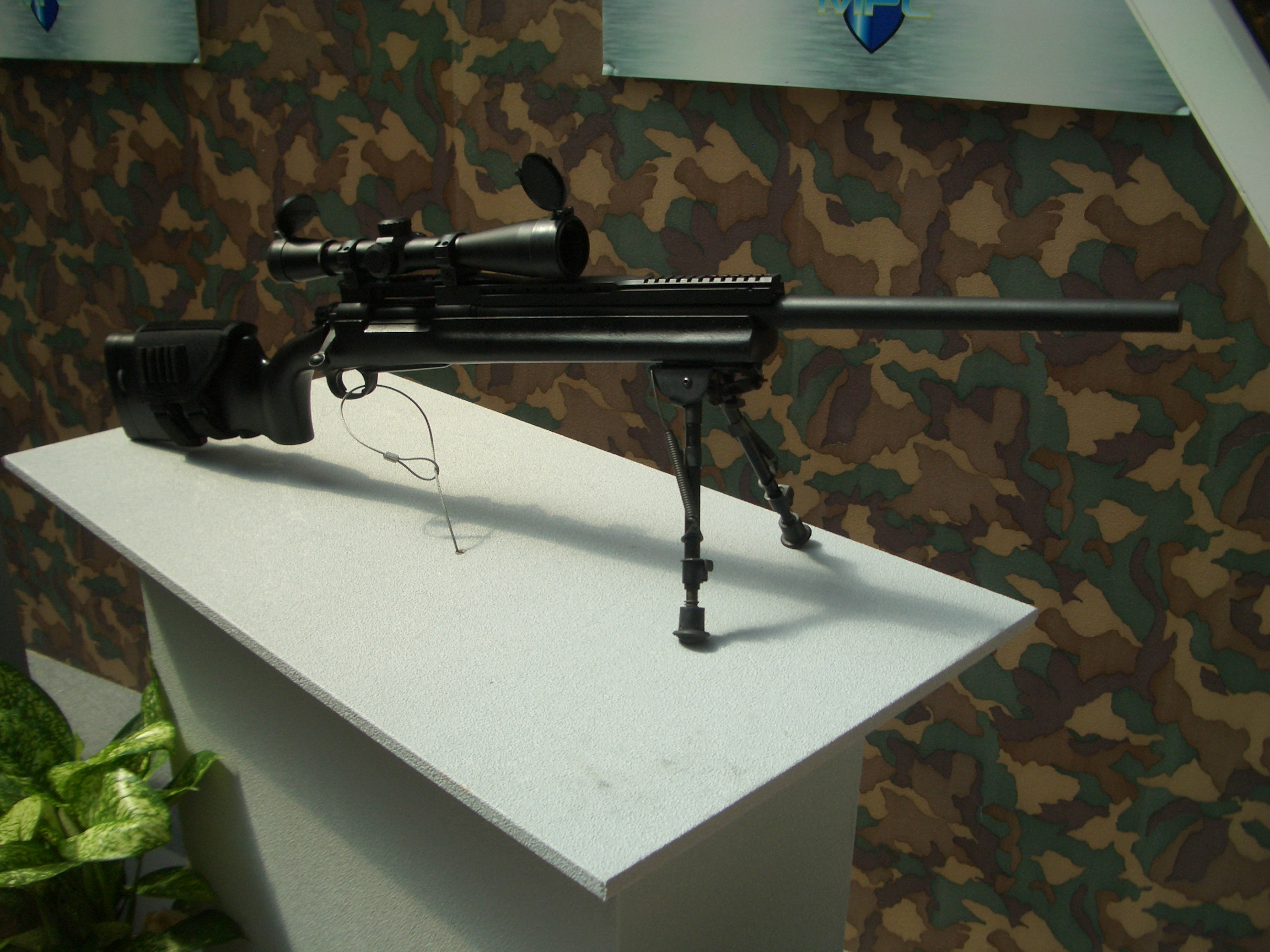
- T93 sniper rifle on display
- Type: Sniper rifle
- Place of origin: Republic of China (Taiwan)

Production history
- Designer: 205th Armory
- Designed: 2003

Specifications
- Cartridge: 7.62 × 51 mm NATO
- Action: Bolt-action
- Effective firing range: Over 800 m (ammunition/sniper-dependent)
- Feed system: 5-round internal magazine
- Sights: Telescopic

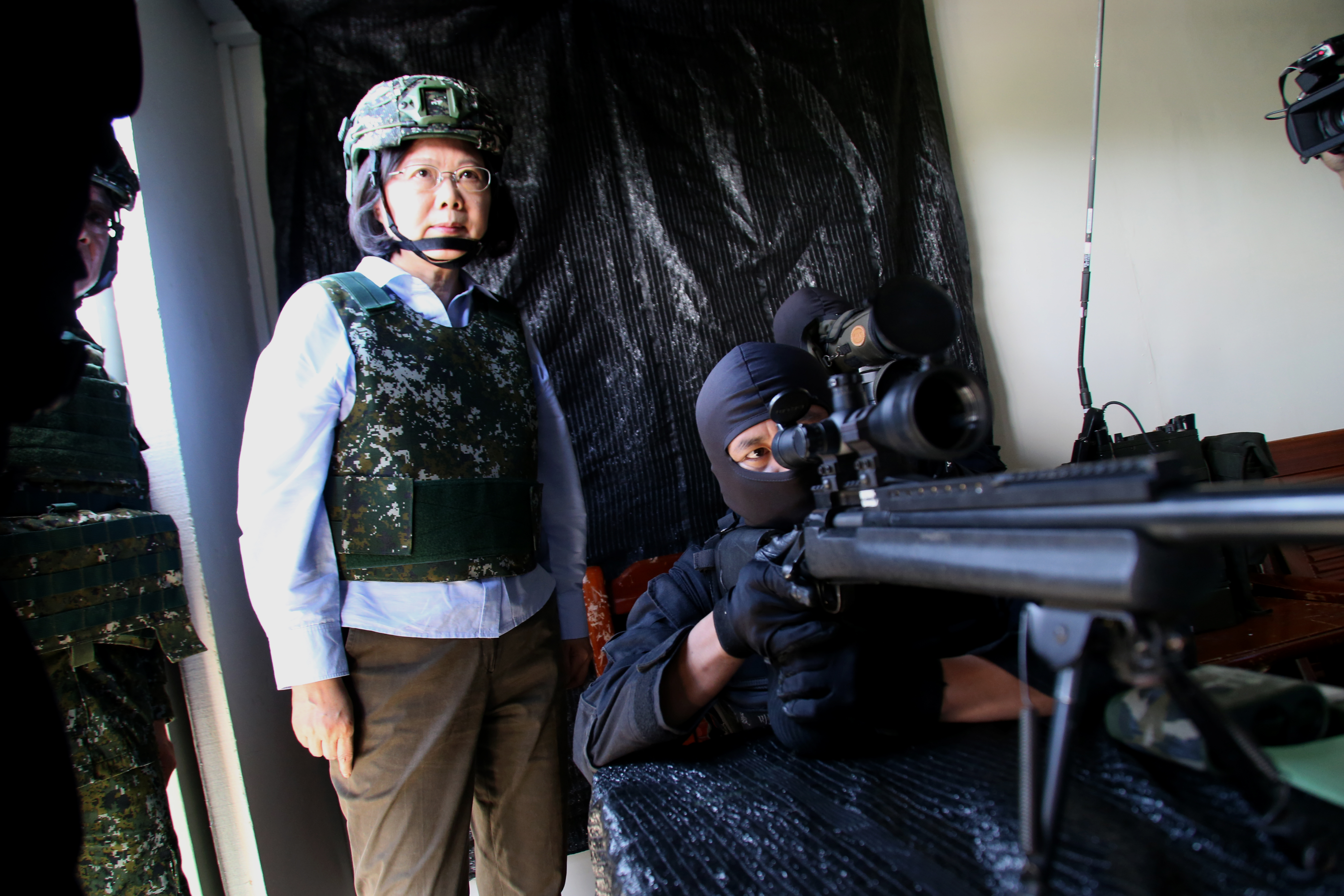
ROCA Special Force Team ASSC 1 demonstrates the T93 for Taiwanese President Tsai Ing-wen

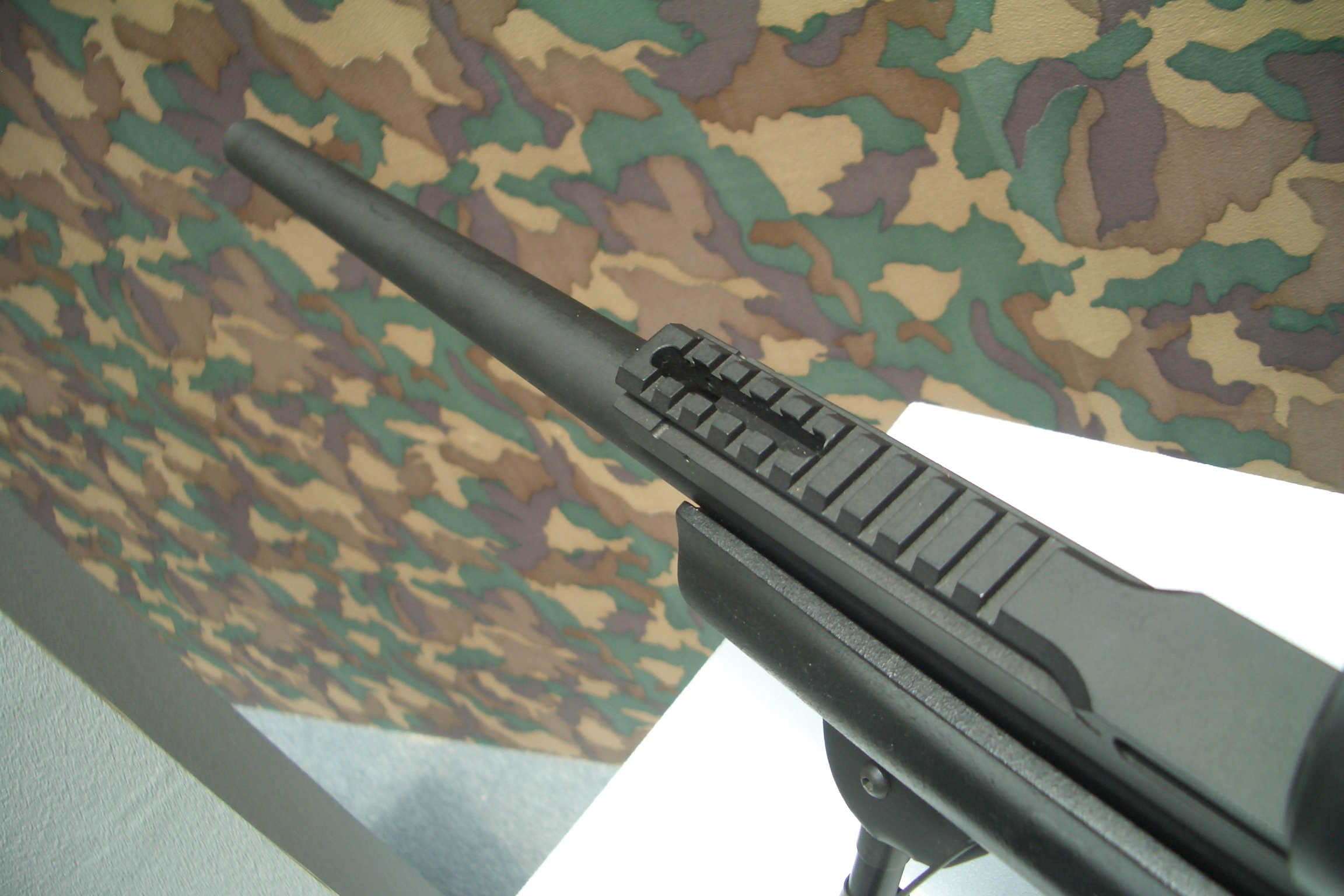
Closeup of barrel

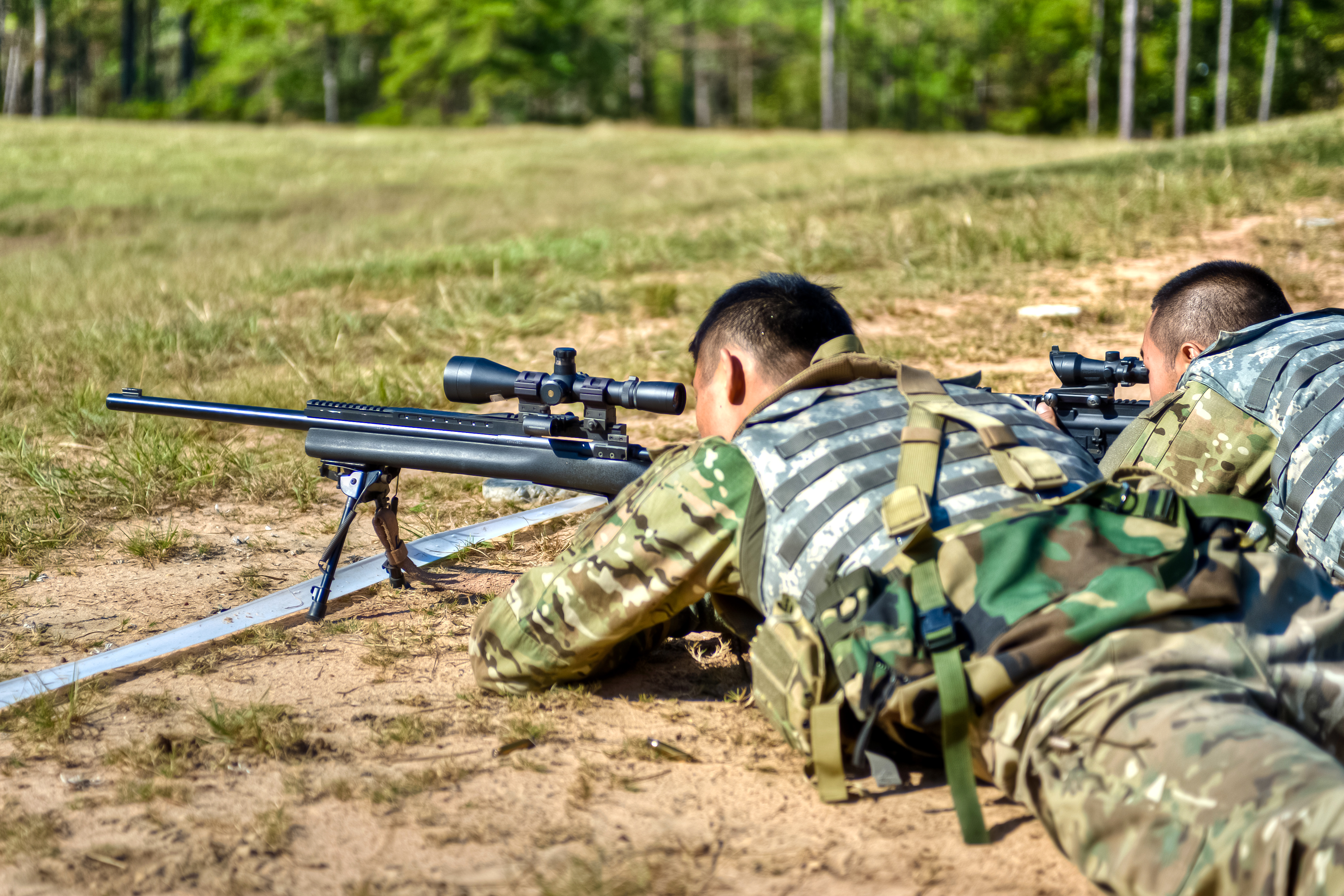
A Taiwanese army sniper, left, fires at targets as his spotter, right, provides him with correct range distances during the International Sniper Competition on Selby Hill, Fort Benning, Ga., Oct. 13, 2010.

The T93 Sniper Rifle (Chinese: 七點六二公厘T93狙擊槍) is a 7.62×51mm bolt-action rifle designed and manufactured in Taiwan. It had an improved variant with 10-rounds magazine, called T93K1.

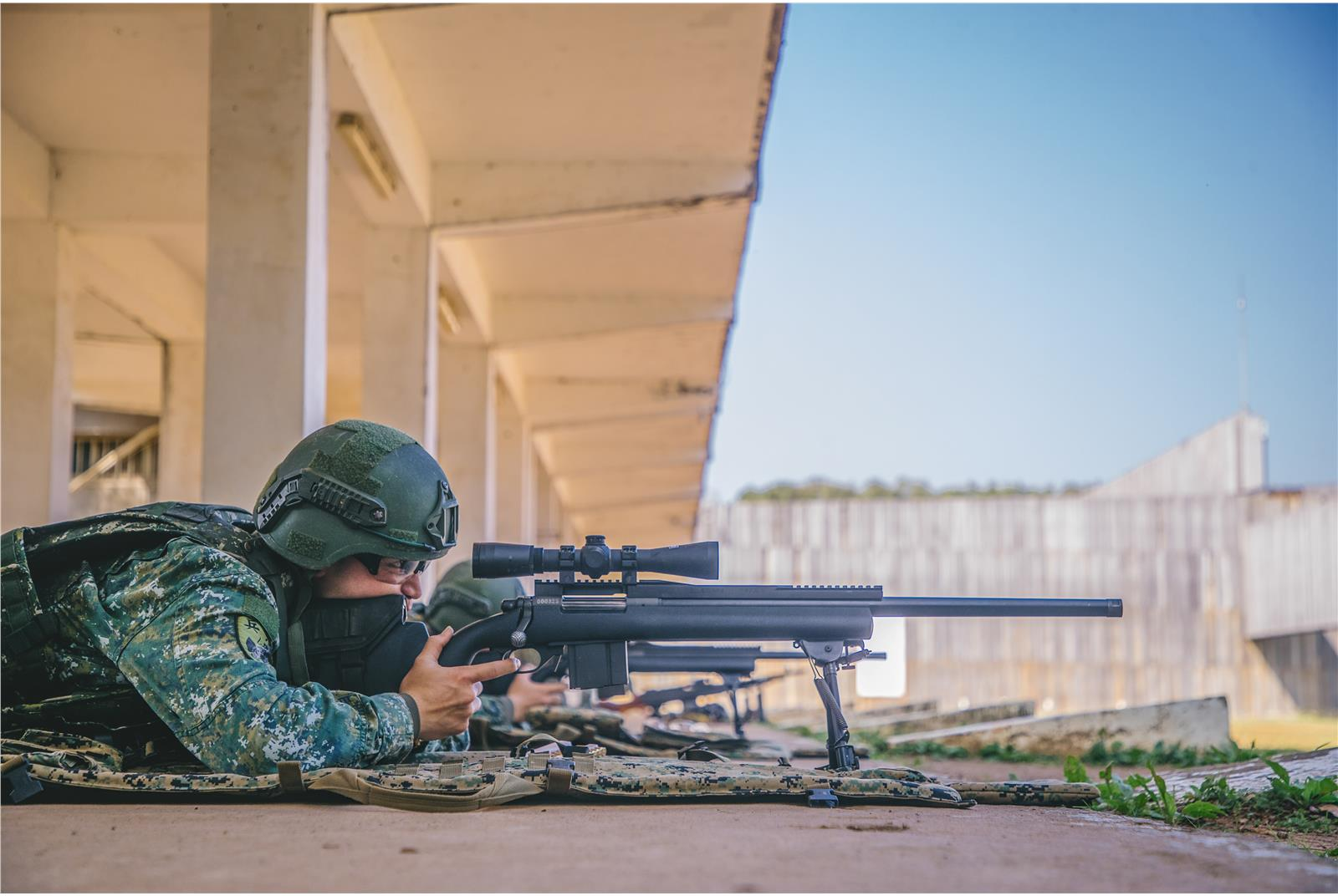
A Republic of China Army soldier fires his T93K1 sniper rifle in training.

== History ==
It was first shown to the public during the 2007 Taipei Aerospace & Defense Technology Exhibition. The primary organization responsible for the development of this rifle is the 205th Armory, with technical assistance from unspecified domestic and foreign firms.

== Design ==
By its appearance, the T93 is closely patterned after the M24 Sniper Weapon System. It features a similar action with internal magazine. The barrel is floated for its entire length. One notable departure from the M24 design is the absence of the front sight base. The adjustable-length stock appears to be H-S Precision PST-25, but is said to have been redesigned using ergonomic measurements of Taiwanese soldiers.

As displayed, the T93 prototype is equipped with a Leupold Ultra M3A riflescope on an extended Picatinny rail mount, allowing the use of night-vision equipment with the scope. The scope mount is similar to the McCann Industries MIRS, but lacks rails on either side. The bipod is a Harris Ultralight 1A2 Series.

According to official news release, T93 scored a best 3-round group size of 0.3 MOA at 800 meters during trials. It was not known whether factory match or hand-loaded ammunition was used. The rifle also passed endurance tests by firing 6,000 rounds without any failure.

Another improved variant, T93K1 had already entered serviced, its main modification is to the feeding method (the magazine type is changed to a 10-round magazine), and a silencer can be added to manually feed and eject the ammunition, which effectively shortens the feeding time and is beneficial for long-distance multi-target sniper missions, improved for urban combat needs.

== Production and Usage ==
Potential customers are scout sniper and special operations/anti-terrorism units in the military, as well as police SWAT units.

In September 2008, the Republic of China Marine Corps announced it will procure 179 T93 rifles and over 100,000 rounds of sniper ammunition over the next two years. One hundred thirty-two rifles and 74,000 rounds of ammunition will be delivered in 2009, while the remaining 47 rifles and 26,000 rounds of ammunition will be delivered in 2010. Total procurement cost is approximately NT$120M (US$3.8M).

== See also ==
- Sniper rifle
  - M24 Sniper Weapon System, a similar sniper rifle also used by Republic of China Army.(7.62×51mm NATO)
  - Sako TRG-22 (.308 Winchester)
  - Accuracy International L115A3 AWM (.338 Lapua Magnum)
  - JS 7.62 (7.62×54mmR)
  - Orsis T-5000 (.338 Lapua Magnum)
