= National Chung-Shan Institute of Science and Technology =

Taiwanese defense company

- Native name: 國家中山科學研究院
- Type: Administrative corporation
- Industry: Defense and Manufacturing
- Predecessor: Armaments Bureau
- Founded: 1 June 1969; 57 years ago
- Headquarters: Taoyuan City, Taiwan
- Key people: Chang Chung-Chung (張忠誠), (President)
- Products: Weapons systems and subsystems
- Revenue: >1.7 billion USD (2019)
- Owner: Taiwanese Government
- Number of employees: ~10,000 (2019)
- Website: www.ncsist.org.tw

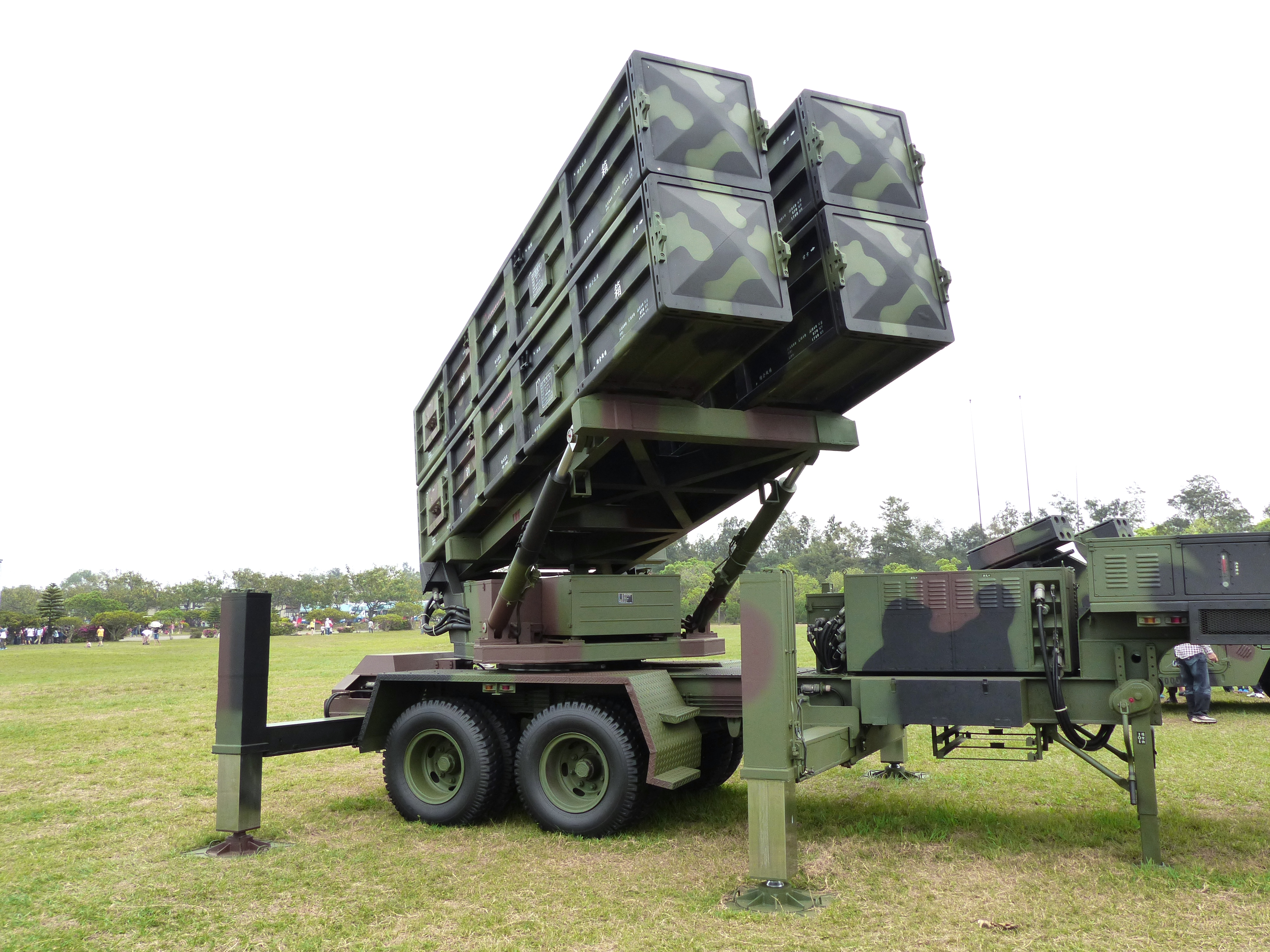
Tien Kung II Missile Launcher Display at Hukou Camp Ground

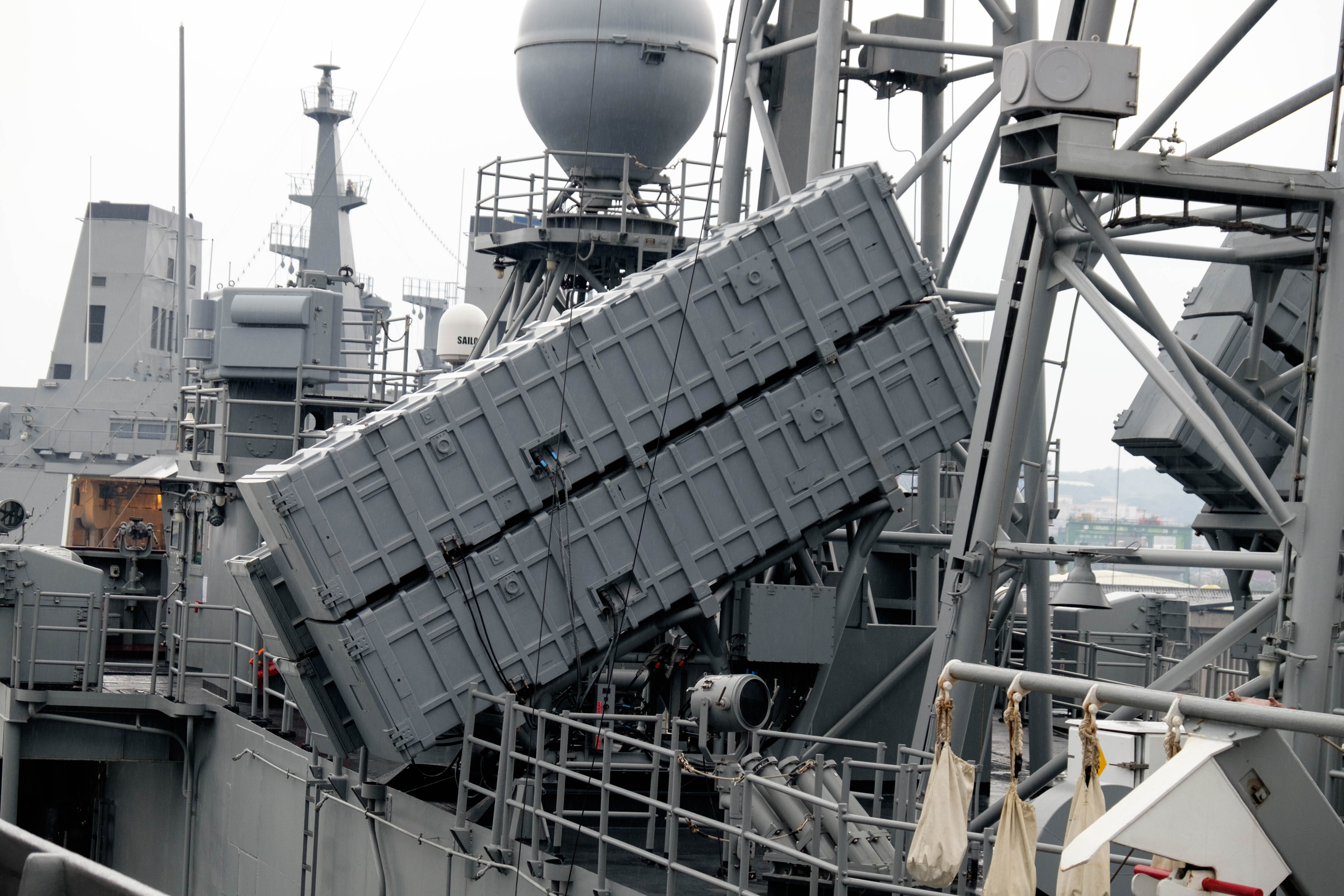
Hsiung Feng II and Hsiung Feng III Anti-Ship Missile Launchers

National Chung-Shan Institute of Science and Technology (NCSIST; Chinese: 國家中山科學研究院; pinyin: Guójiā Zhōngshān Kēxué Yánjiùyuàn) is a Taiwanese state owned corporation, formerly part of the Ministry of National Defense's Armaments Bureau, which is active in the development, manufacturing, support, and sustainment of various weapons systems and dual use technologies.

NCSIST was established by the Taiwanese government to serve as a military R&D and systems integration center. In 2014 it became an administrative corporation owned by the Government of Taiwan. NCSIST is involved in product development, manufacturing, delivery, total life cycle sustainment and maintenance. NCSIST fulfills a function comparable to the American Defense Advanced Research Projects Agency (DARPA) but they also assume mixed roles in competing for and awarding research and development, integration and manufacturing contracts. Along with the Aerospace Industrial Development Corporation, NCSIST it is considered to be one of the two Taiwanese prime defense contractors. It is one of the 100 largest defense companies in the world.

== History ==
=== Early history ===
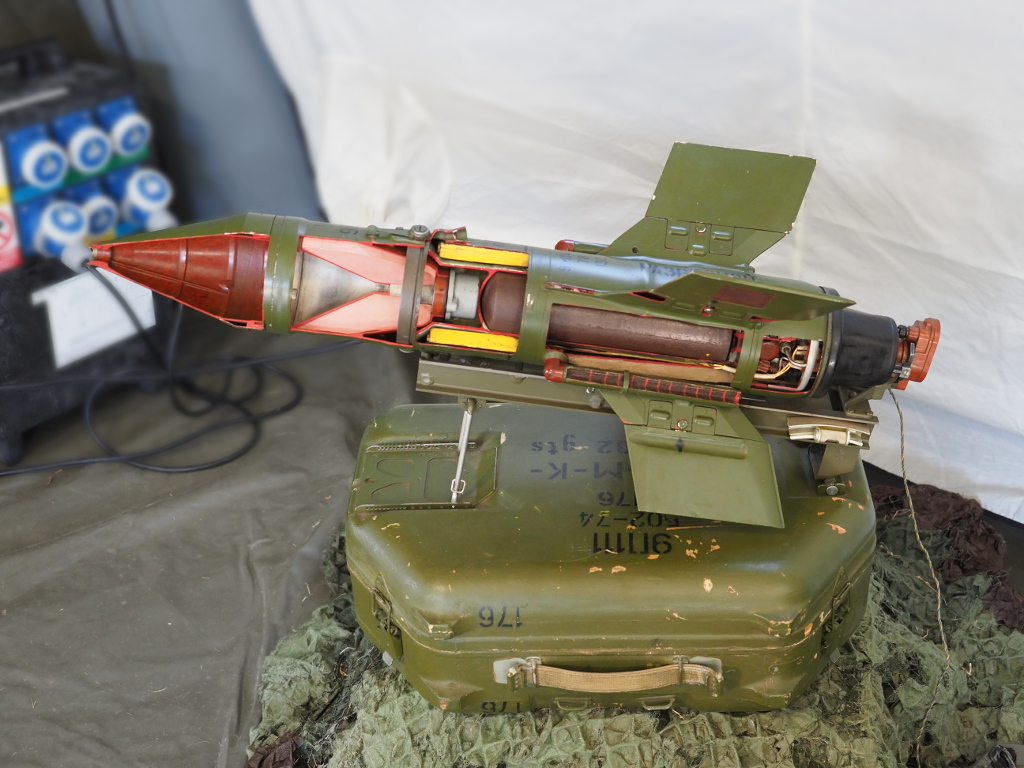
9M14 Malyutka cutaway

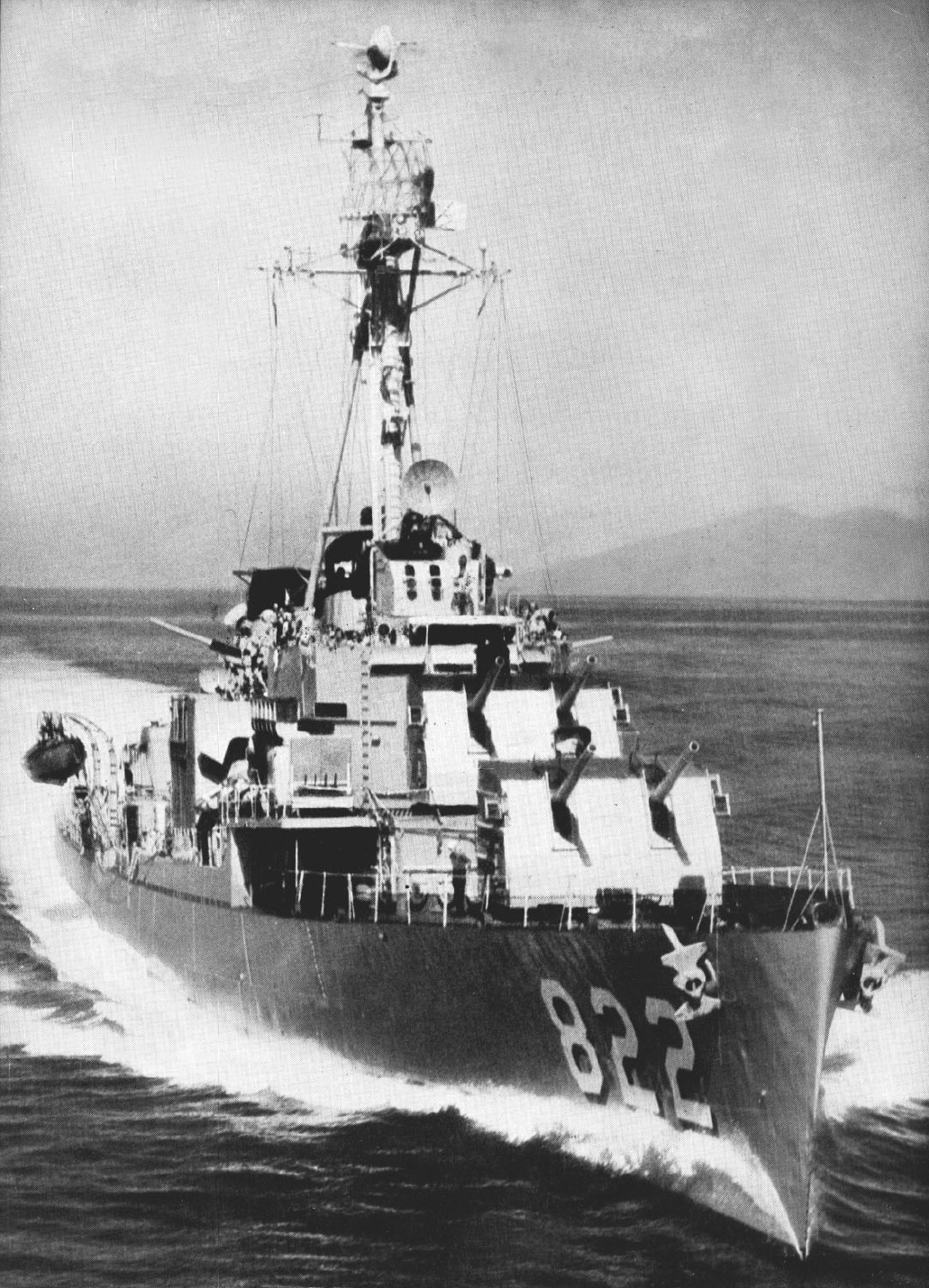
Gearing class destroyer underway in 1952

Prior to the establishment of NCSIST, Taiwan had a poorly organized national defense industrial program, but the nation was faced with an increasing military threat from the People's Republic of China and a drawdown in international support and exclusion from international forums. Taiwan would need to build its own set of hardware, instruments, laboratories, and test sites if it was to secure its independence and security. Preparation for the NCSIST began in 1965, ground was broken on the Shinshin Campus in 1966, and the institute was formally inaugurated in 1969. Early work includes various missile and radar systems, as well as systems integration for ROC military aircraft and ships. The NCSIST was also, and remains, active in military construction. After the United States switched diplomatic recognition from the Republic of China to the People's Republic of China the Institute became even more important as Taiwanese authorities felt they could no longer view the United States as a reliable defense partner.

In the 1970s, the Institute replicated and produced the 9M14 Malyutka wire-guided anti-tank guided missile as the Kun Wu. The ROC had obtained the 9M14 Malyutkas from South Vietnam. Due to the dated design and low priority placed on anti-tank weapons by the armed forces it was not widely adopted. By the mid-1970s the Institute employed about 2,000 professionals.

In the late 1970s the Institute embarked on a project to create a short-range ballistic missile prototype known as the Ching Feng. The project was intended as a pilot project to build the necessary skills needed for a long range missile program. The Ching Feng was a single stage missile which could carry a 450 kg warhead up to 110 km. The type was displayed publicly in 1981 but production was cancelled in 1982 because of significant problems with the solid rocket motor and the guidance system. Overall the type resembled the American MGM-52 Lance. The follow on missile to, to be named Sky Horse, was also abandoned in 1981 under US pressure although interest in the type was revived in the 1990s after the Third Taiwan Strait Crisis.

In the 1980s the Institute worked with Honeywell to design a distributed open architecture combat system to replace the obsolete MK 37 Gun Fire Control System aboard Taiwan's Gearing-class destroyers. This system, called the Modular Combat System (MCS), was the first distributed open architecture combat system in the world and featured easily upgradable COTS components. The system had challenges but did the job and was affordable with the architecture, computer, and software all being developed in Taiwan.

In the 1990s Taiwan was faced with tightening restrictions on arms imports from the international community as well as instability caused by the transition from an authoritarian to a democratic system. The Institute responded to these challenges by widening the scope of its R&D programs and implementing a system of vertical integration. In the late 1990s NCSIST developed a space launch platform based on their ballistic missile technology but this program was put on hold under a combination of US pressure and a promise to subsidize Taiwanese satellite launches using commercial American companies such as SpaceX.

In 2011 NCSIST awarded MiTAC a NT$70 million (US$2.22 million) contract to build one prototype "Radar Vehicle for Field Operation and Air Defense." In 2015 police in Taoyuan took into custody three workers and one manager from MiTAC on charges of forgery of data and fabrication of test results. The tender required the vehicle to be able to advance at 8 km/h up a 40 degree incline, the vehicle MiTAC delivered could only advance at 6 km/h. In addition three NCSIST staff were detained on suspicion of colluding with the MiTAC employees to fabricate the test results, these staff then presented the fabricated results to their superiors for approval. The Taoyuan District Prosecutors' Office began investigating after receiving a tip.

=== Modern history ===
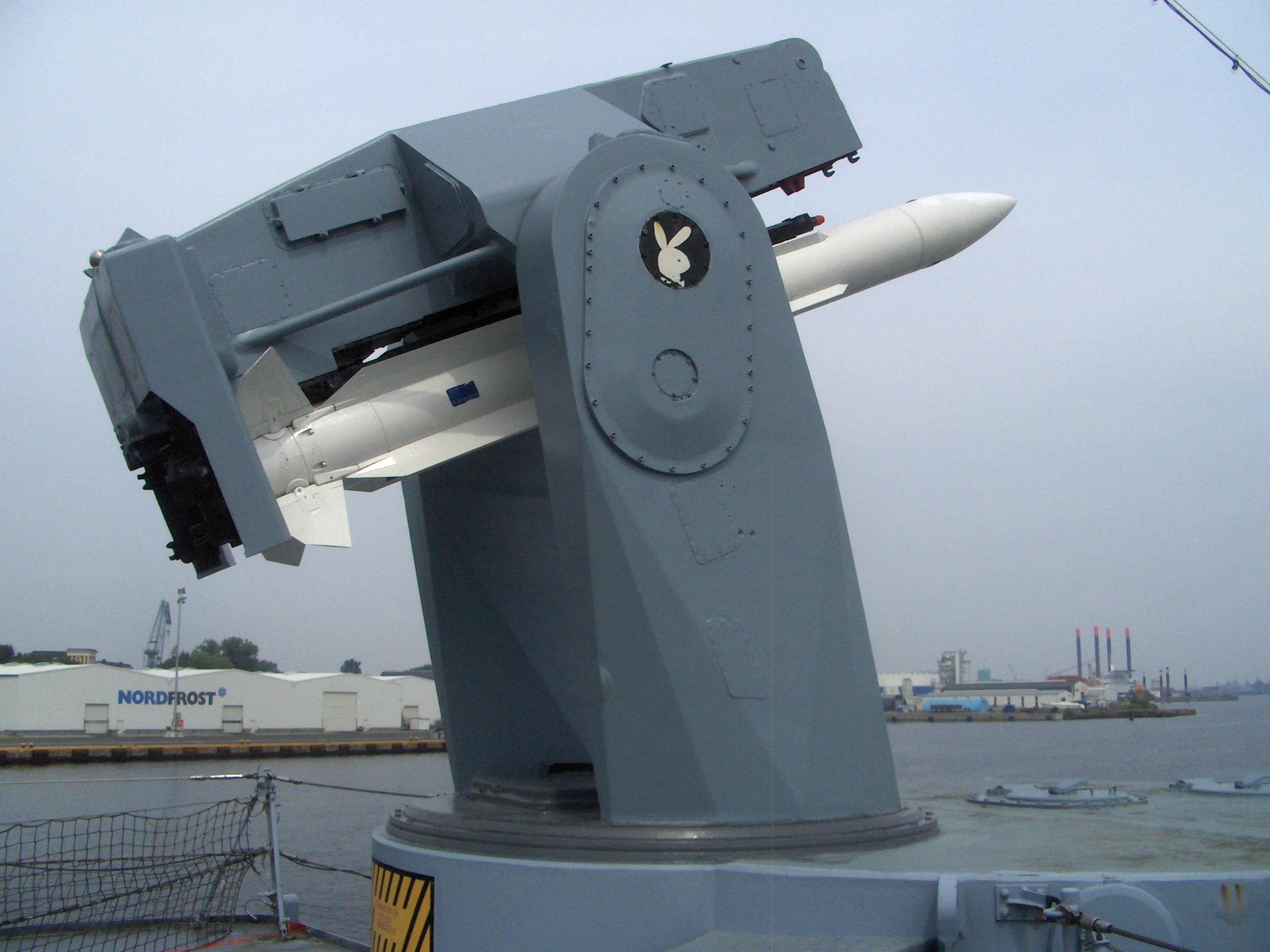
Mk 13 missile launcher with SM-1

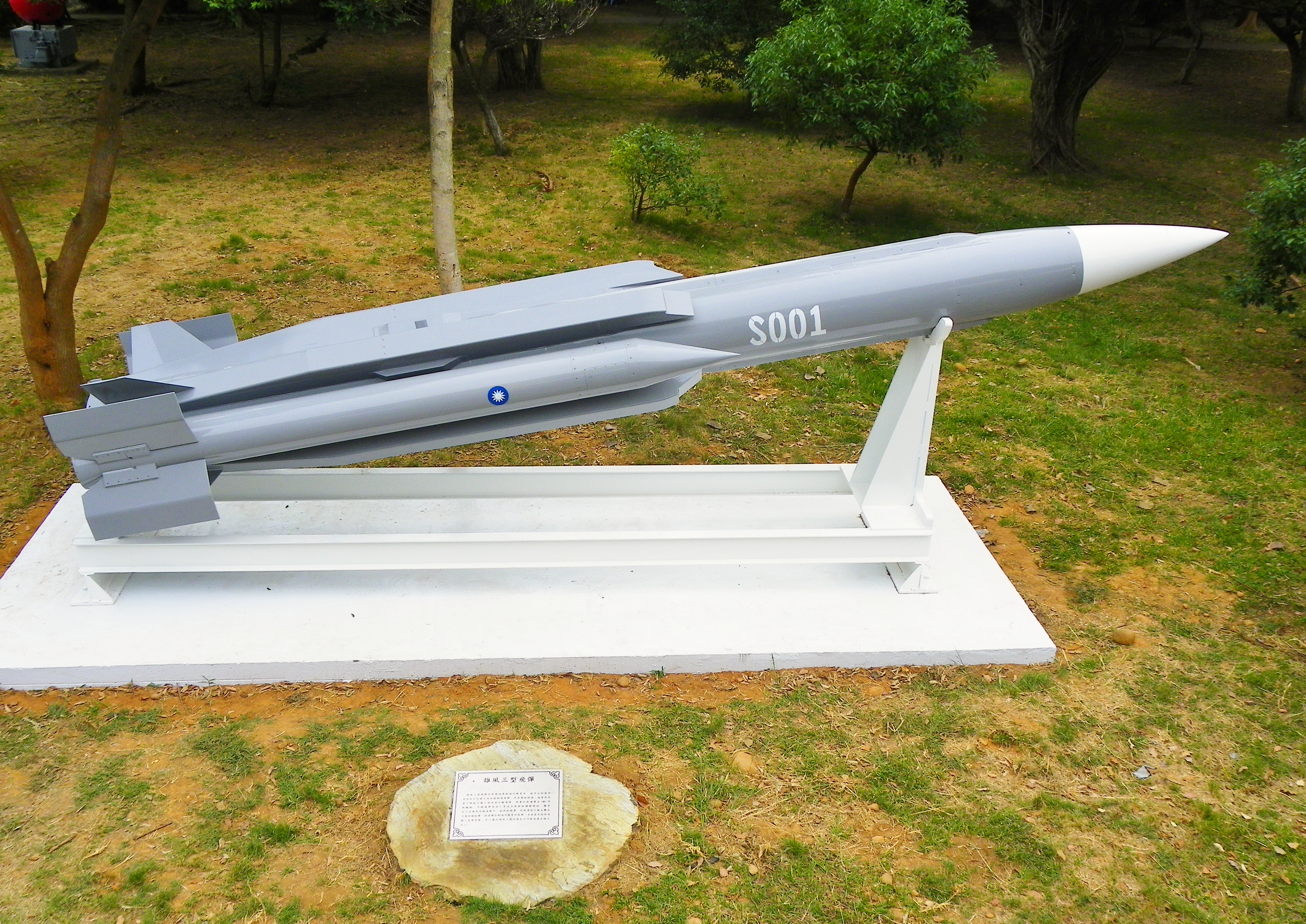
First model of the Hsiung Feng III Anti-Ship Missile

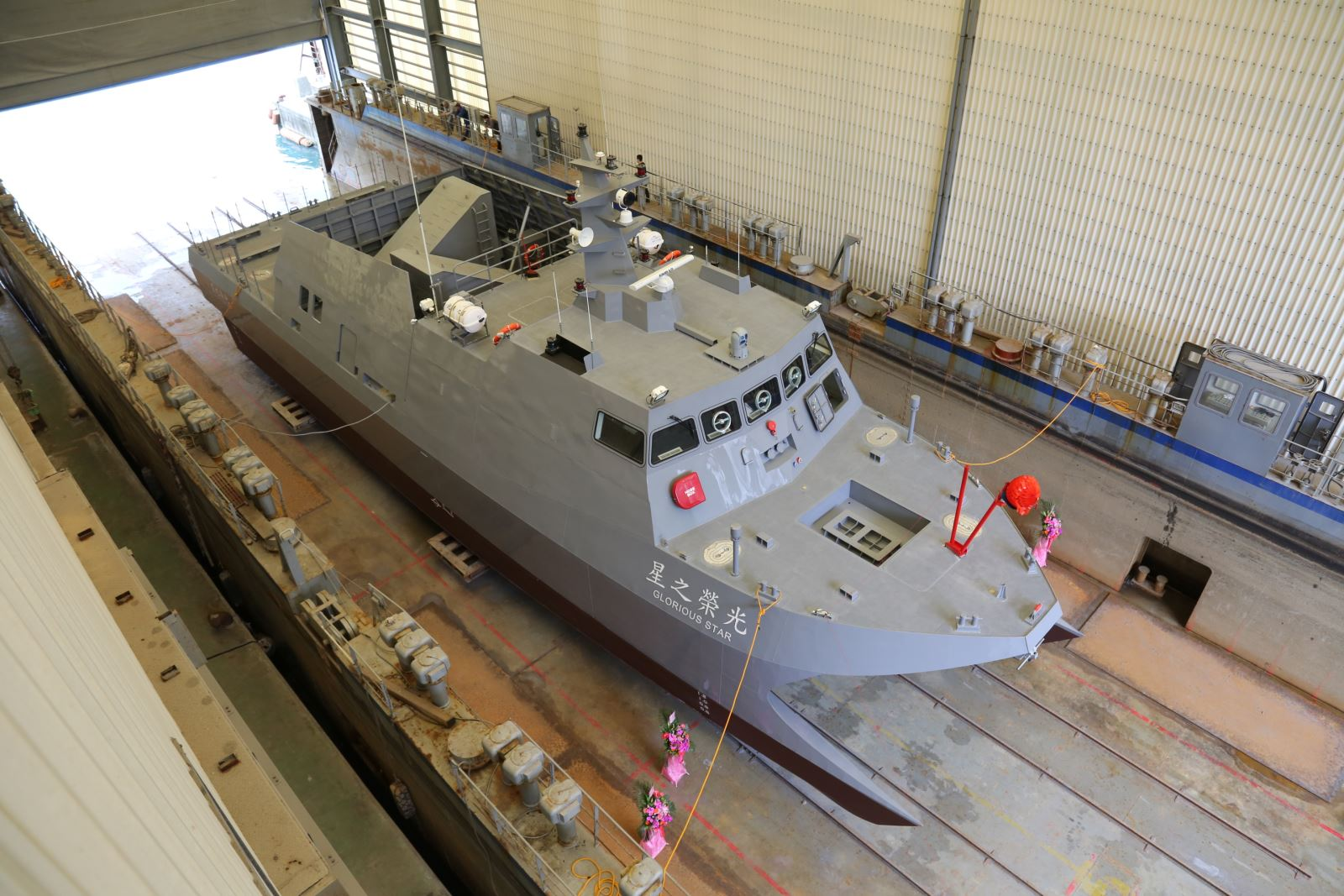
Test ship Glorious Star

In 2014 NCSIST was made an administrative corporation by the government, ending its period of secrecy and opening up the opportunity to partner with foreign corporations and export equipment internationally. The new corporate Board of Directors had their first meeting on April 18, 2014. The transition removed a number of restrictions for employees who were now no longer members of the military.

Due to the end of the US Navy's support of the SM-1 missile system NCSIST has taken over support for the system including production of replacement rocket motors. The same approach was taken for the SM-1's Mark 13 missile launcher.

In 2016 NCSIST was awarded a $16.7m contract to carry out a life extension program for the Republic of China Air Force's stocks of MICA and Magic 2 air-to-air missiles. These two missiles arm the ROCAF's Mirage 2000 fighter aircraft.

In 2017 NCSIST announced the commencement of "Project Vega" (織女星計畫) with the goal of producing an advanced domestic fighter as a successor to the F-CK-1. Development was to be split into two parts, the overall design and the engine production, with production to start in 2027. The engine has been dubbed F125XX and is expected to generate 16,400 lbf (73 kN). In 2021 NCSIST stated that work on both parts of the project had progressed ahead of schedule and would be completed by 2024.

In 2017 NCIST exhibited again at International Defence Exhibition in Abu Dhabi after a twelve-year absence. They exhibited 39 items.

In the mid-2010s NCSIST partnered with AIDC and the Republic of China Air Force (ROCAF) to create an advanced jet trainer based on the F-CK-1. AIDC is the prime contractor on the project with NCSIST taking a supporting role. Originally designated the XT-5 Blue Magpie but ruled out as the T-5 Brave Eagle the aircraft is based on the two-seat version of the F-CK-1 but with non-afterburning engines, greater fuel capacity, more stable wing profile, and the removal of the internal gun. The first of four prototypes, designated A1, was rolled out in September 2019. As of end of 2023 31 Brave Eagle (勇鹰) planes have been developed or evaluated. Total order is 66 planes.

NCSIST is participating in the development of the first domestic Taiwanese AUV. In 2019 NCSIST launched an 80-ton 28m long high speed catamaran research and test vessel named the Glorious Star (光榮之星). Built in Lungteh Shipbuilding's Yilan County shipyard the purpose of the vessel is to shorten the research and development process for naval weapon systems.

In 2019 Taiwanese President Tsai Ing-wen ordered the NCSIST to accelerate mass production of the TK-3 and HF-3 in response to increasing Chinese military power and bellicosity. In addition to stepping up missile production the President also ordered NCSIST leadership to focus building up their talent pool and increase partnerships with academia, industry and government at home and abroad. Mass production of the long-range Yun Feng supersonic cruise missile began in 2019.

In 2019 NCSIST opened Taiwan's first national unmanned aerial vehicle test site in Miaoli County. The test site is managed in partnership by NCSIST, the Miaoli County government, and the Ministry of Transportation and Communications (Taiwan). The site features a 20m runway and is rated for testing UAVs up to 150 kg in weight. They also entered into an agreement with Asustek Computer Inc to collaborate on cloud-based storage, artificial intelligence, and Internet of Things technology.

In November 2019 NCSIST tested a new short range anti-ship missile from the Glorious Star which while weighting significantly less than the Hsiung Feng II is said to have the same range.

In March 2020 NCSIST conducted live fire daytime and nighttime artillery and UAV detection tests which were observed by a People's Liberation Army Navy Hsiang Yang Hung-class survey vessel.

In April 2020 Chang Chung-Cheng (張忠誠) replaced Gao Chung-Hsing (杲中興) as the president of NCSIST. Gao had courted controversy by deliberately misinterpreting The Classified National Security Information Protection Act. Chang Chung-Cheng is a retired major general who served in the Combined Logistics Command as well as the Armaments Bureau.

In July 2020 NCSIST was awarded a NT$4.8 billion (US$163 million) contract to produce 516 sets of secure high frequency radios for the Taiwanese military. The military side of the contract will be handled by the Navy with a deadline for delivery in late 2023.

In 2021 the Taiwanese army ordered 50 drone helicopters from NCSIST for delivery by the first quarter 2022.

In 2021 NCSIST deputy director Leng Chin-hsu told the Taiwanese Parliament that NCSIST had three previously undisclosed long range missiles in development. Defense minister Chiu Kuo-cheng added that work by NCSIST on such weapons had never stopped and remained a priority.

In May 2021 the Taiwanese navy ordered a new series of shore based medium-to-long range maritime surveillance radars from NCSIST.

In August 2021 it was announced that an extended range version of the TC-2 had been ordered by the Air Force with 250-300 ordered from NCSIST at a unit cost of NT$30 million (US$1.07 million).

In September 2021 a delegation of Taiwanese legislators paid a visit to NCSIST after approving a NT$240 billion (US$8.63 billion) special budget for domestic weapons procurement.

In 2022 SIPRI placed NCSIST on the list of the 100 largest arms manufactures in the world, ranking 60th with a 2022 operating income of two billion USD and a projected 2023 operating income of four billion USD.

In June 2025 NCSIST signed a deal with drone software company Auterion to integrate Auterion's software with NCSIST drones and partner company drones. The deal potentially covers millions of drones.

In July 2025 China placed NCSIST on an export control list however NCSIST is already required to avoid sourcing components from China by Taiwanese government regulations.

At the 2025 Taipei Aerospace & Defense Technology Exhibition NCIST announced partnership deals with six foreign defense companies. This included jointly manufacturing missiles with Anduril Industries working on air and missile defense integration with Northrop Grumman, work with AeroVironment, Inc on autonomous systems, and joint production with Kratos Defense of a multipurpose drone.

=== WMDs ===
The institute developed nuclear weapons during the Cold War. In 1967, a nuclear weapons program began under the auspices of the Institute of Nuclear Energy Research (INER) of CSIST. After the International Atomic Energy Agency found evidence of the ROC's efforts to produce weapons-grade plutonium, Taipei agreed in September 1976 under U.S. pressure to dismantle its nuclear weapons program. Though the nuclear reactor was soon shut down and the plutonium mostly returned to the U.S., a secret program was revealed when Colonel Chang Hsien-yi, deputy director of nuclear research at INER, defected to the U.S. in December 1987 and produced a cache of incriminating documents. At present there is no claim that any nuclear weapons program is being pursued.

== Developed weapons systems ==
=== Aircraft ===
- AIDC F-CK-1 Ching-kuo: Developed by division later spun off as AIDC and was a contractor also. Worked with AIDC to provide upgrades for the IDF.
- AIDC AT-3 Tz-chiang Advanced Trainer
- AIDC T-5 Brave Eagle jet trainer/lead-in trainer developed in partnership with AIDC and Republic of China Air Force. Based on F-CK-1 B/D.
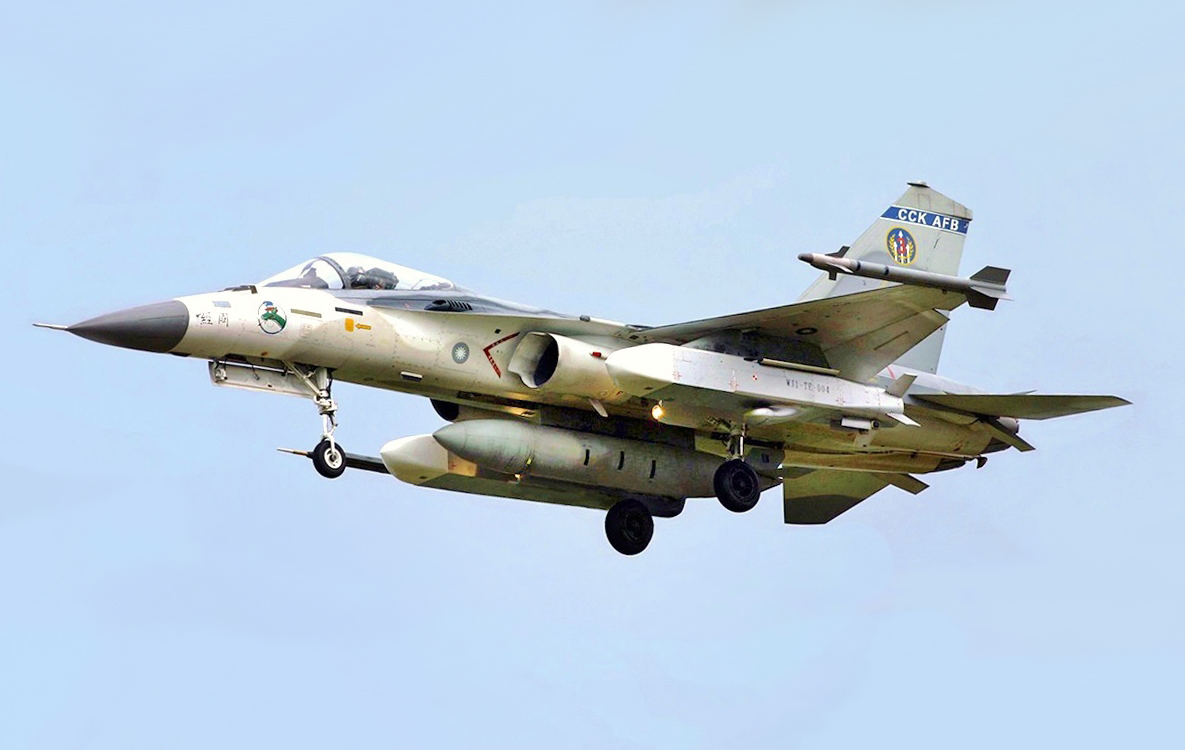
IDF with Wan Chien

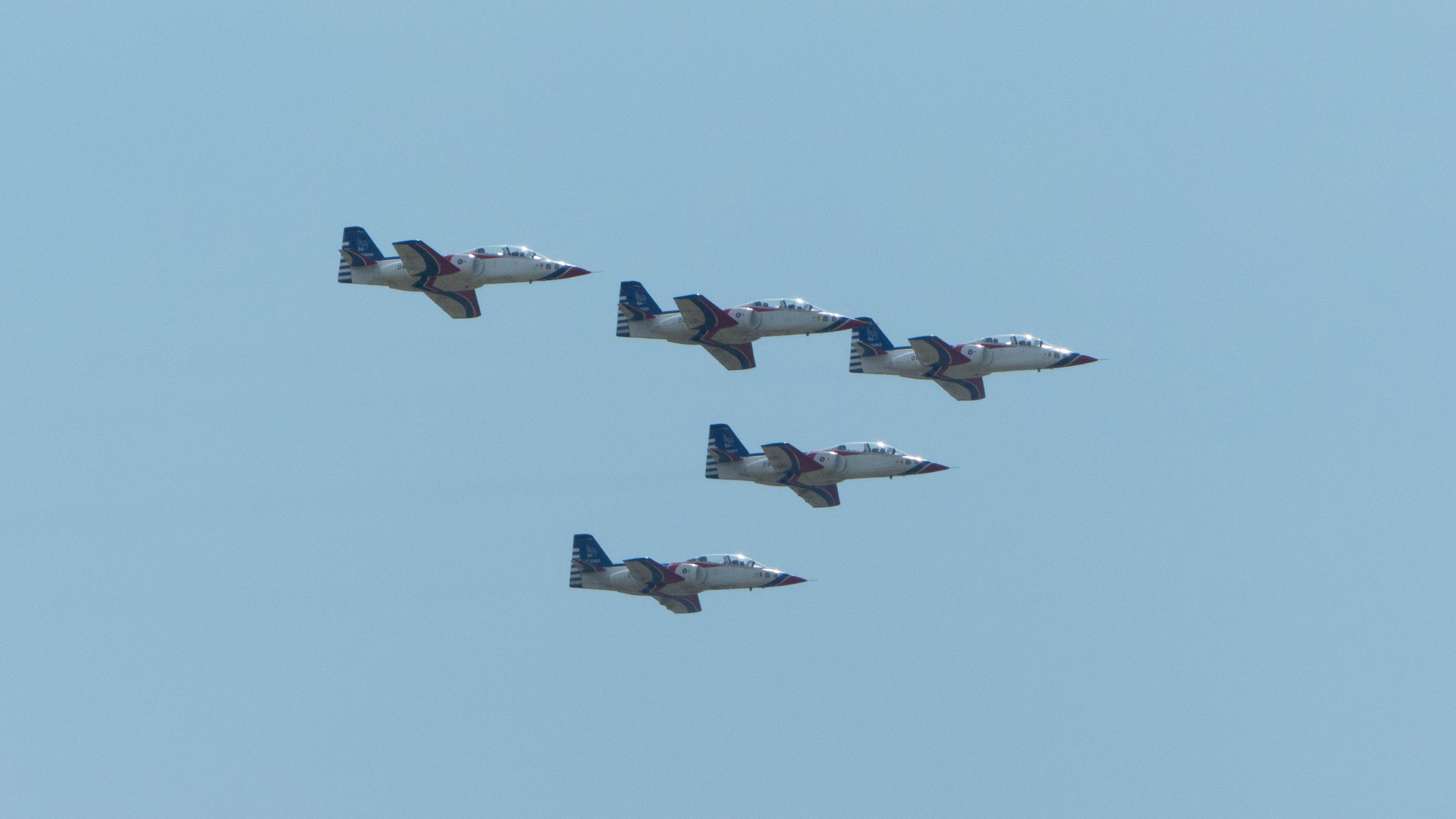
ROCAFA AT-3s

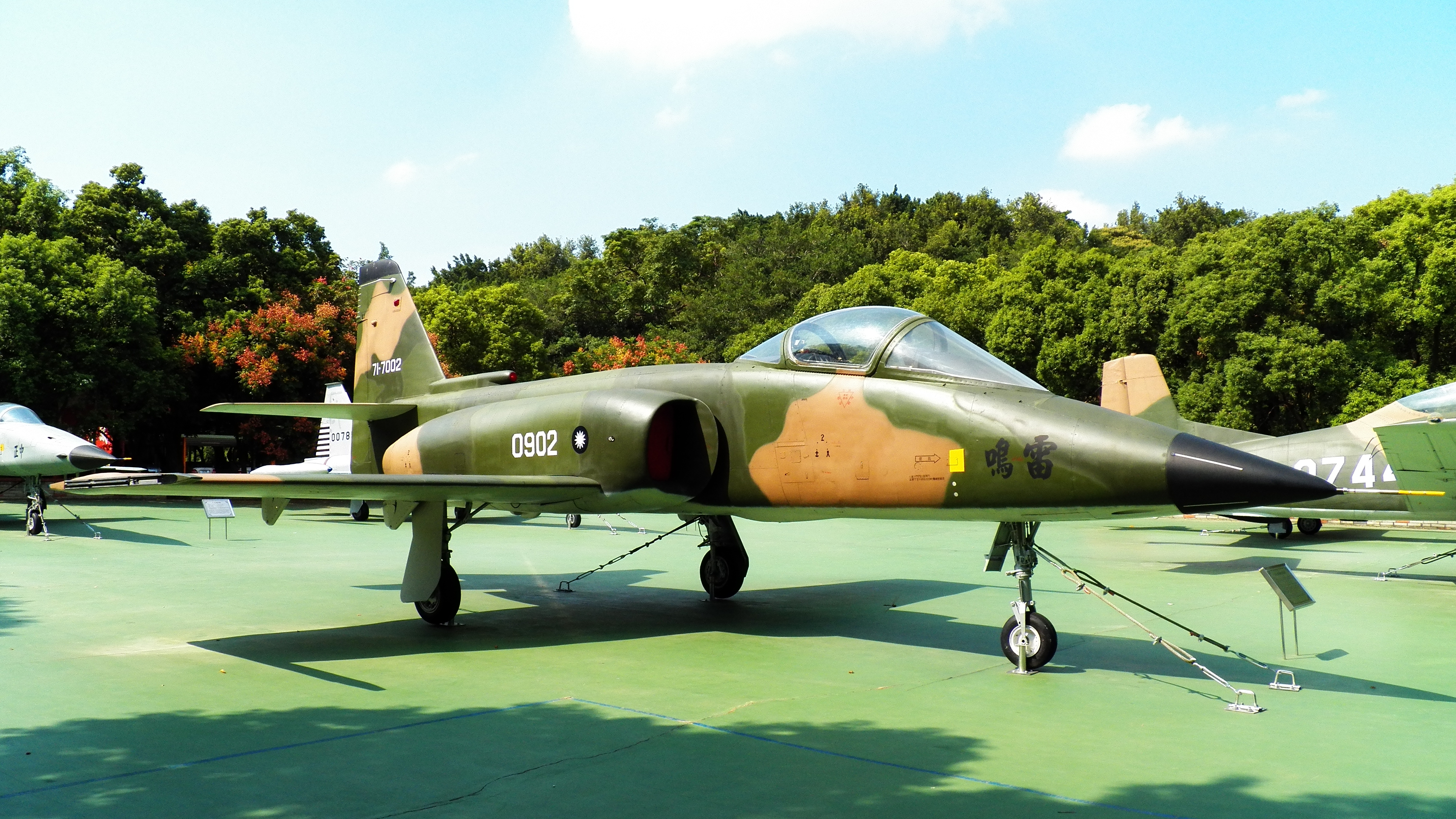
XA-3

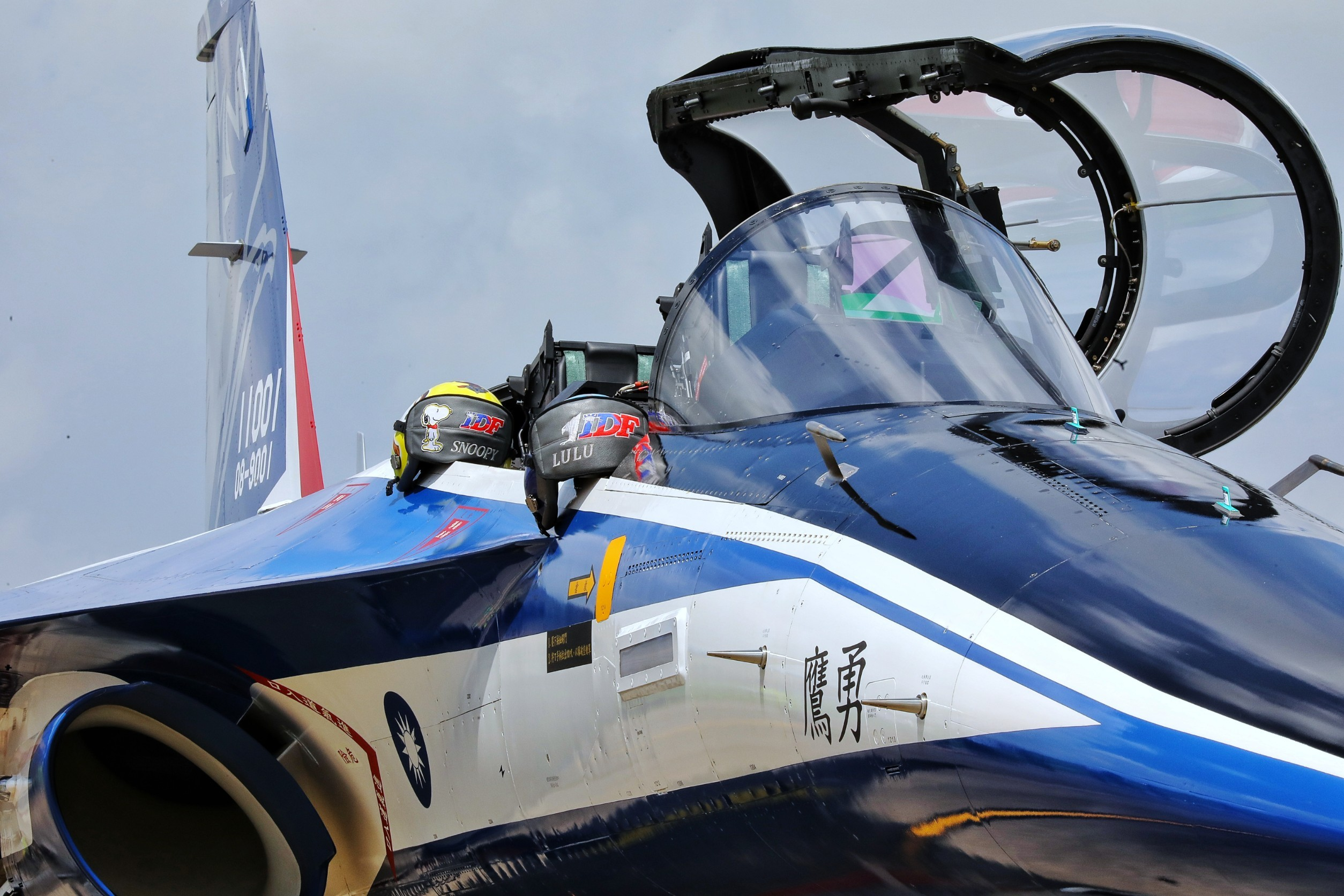
T-5 Brave Eagle

=== Drones and loitering munitions ===
- NCSIST Albatross Tactical Unmanned Aircraft System and the improved Albatross II.
- NCSIST Teng Yun (Cloud Rider) Unmanned Aircraft System: MALE analogous to the US MQ-9. Unveiled in 2015.
- NCSIST Cardinal, family of small UAVs. Includes Cardinal I, Cardinal II, Fire Cardinal, and Cardinal III.
- NCSIST Chien Hsiang: First exhibited in 2017, visually similar to IAI Harpy. In 2019 the Taiwan Air Force's Air Defense and Missile Command announced a five-year, NT$80b (US$2.54b) project to build up a full force of anti-radiation UAVs. The anti-radiation drone has a reported loiter time of 100 hours and a top speed of 185 km/h. Three variants were unveiled in 2023.
- NCSIST Spark: target drone.
- NCSIST Flamingo II: target drone.
- NCSIST Capricorn, single rotor helicopter drone
- Mighty Hornet I/Loitering Munition UAV, Switchblade 300 sized loitering munition unveiled in 2023
- Mighty Hornet III, a VTOL X-winged loitering munition
- Mighty Hornet IV, multipurpose drone developed from the Kratos MQM-178 Firejet target drone in collaboration with Kratos.
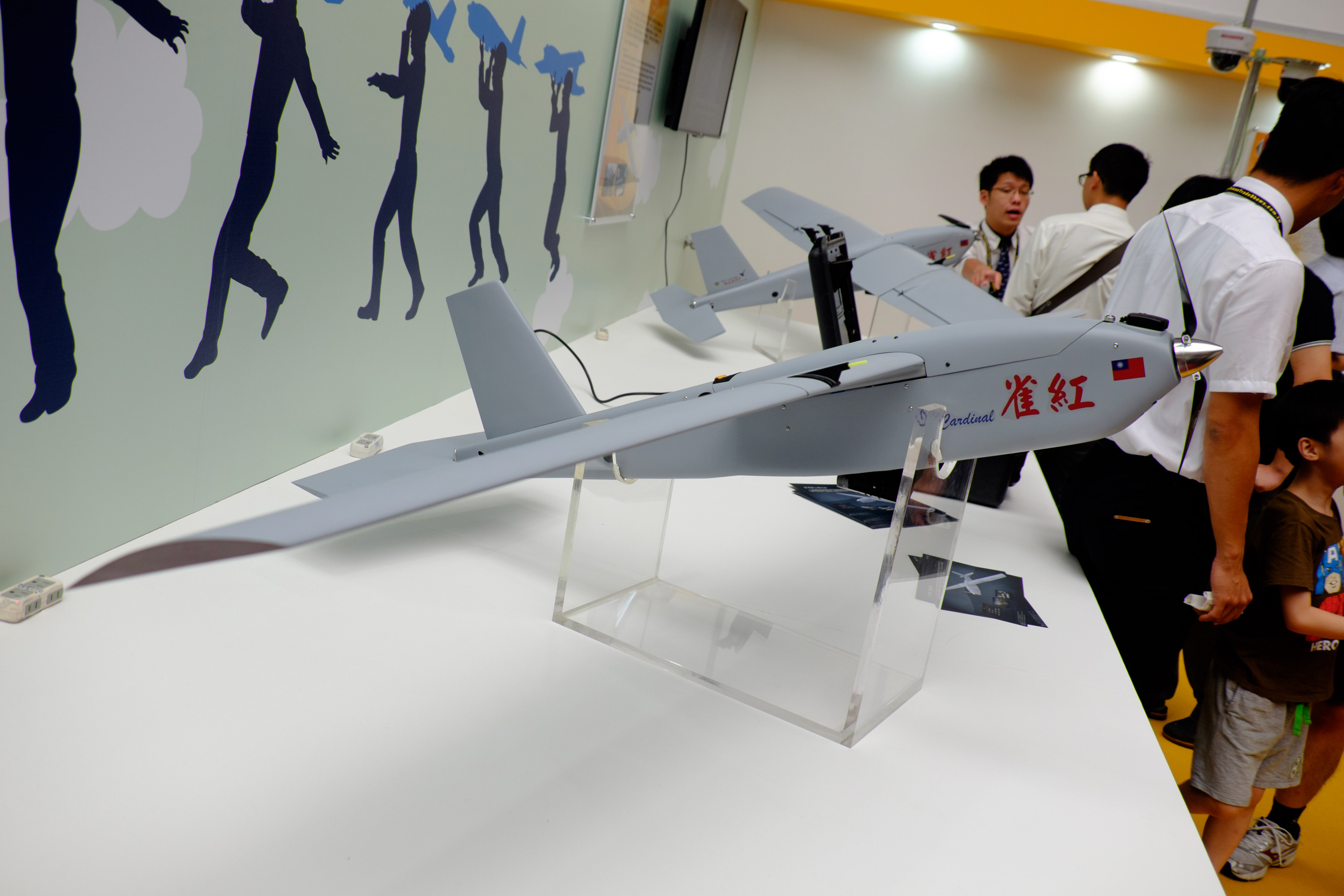
NCSIST Cardinal UAV

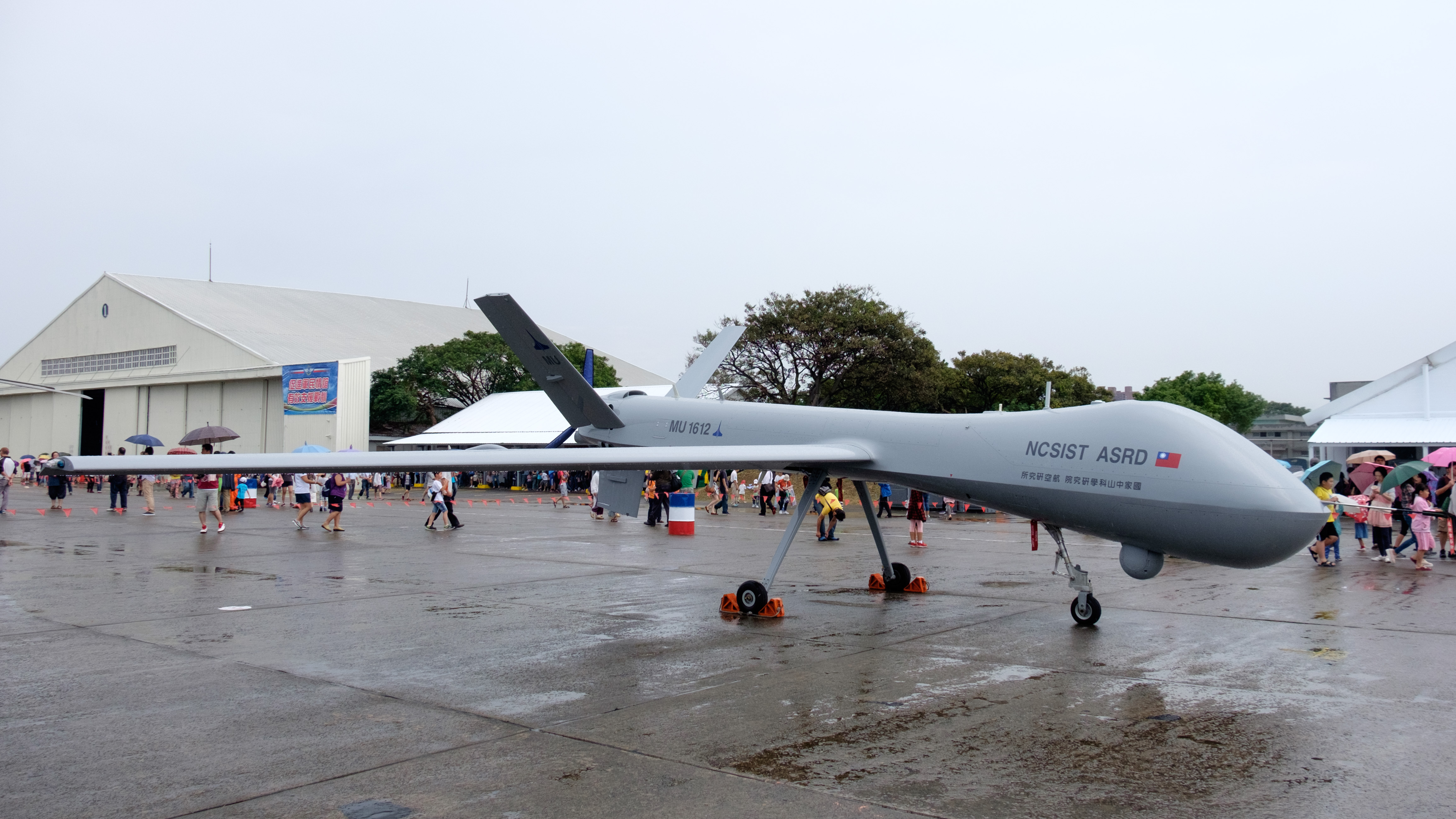
NCSIST Teng Yun on Display at Hsinchu Air Force Base

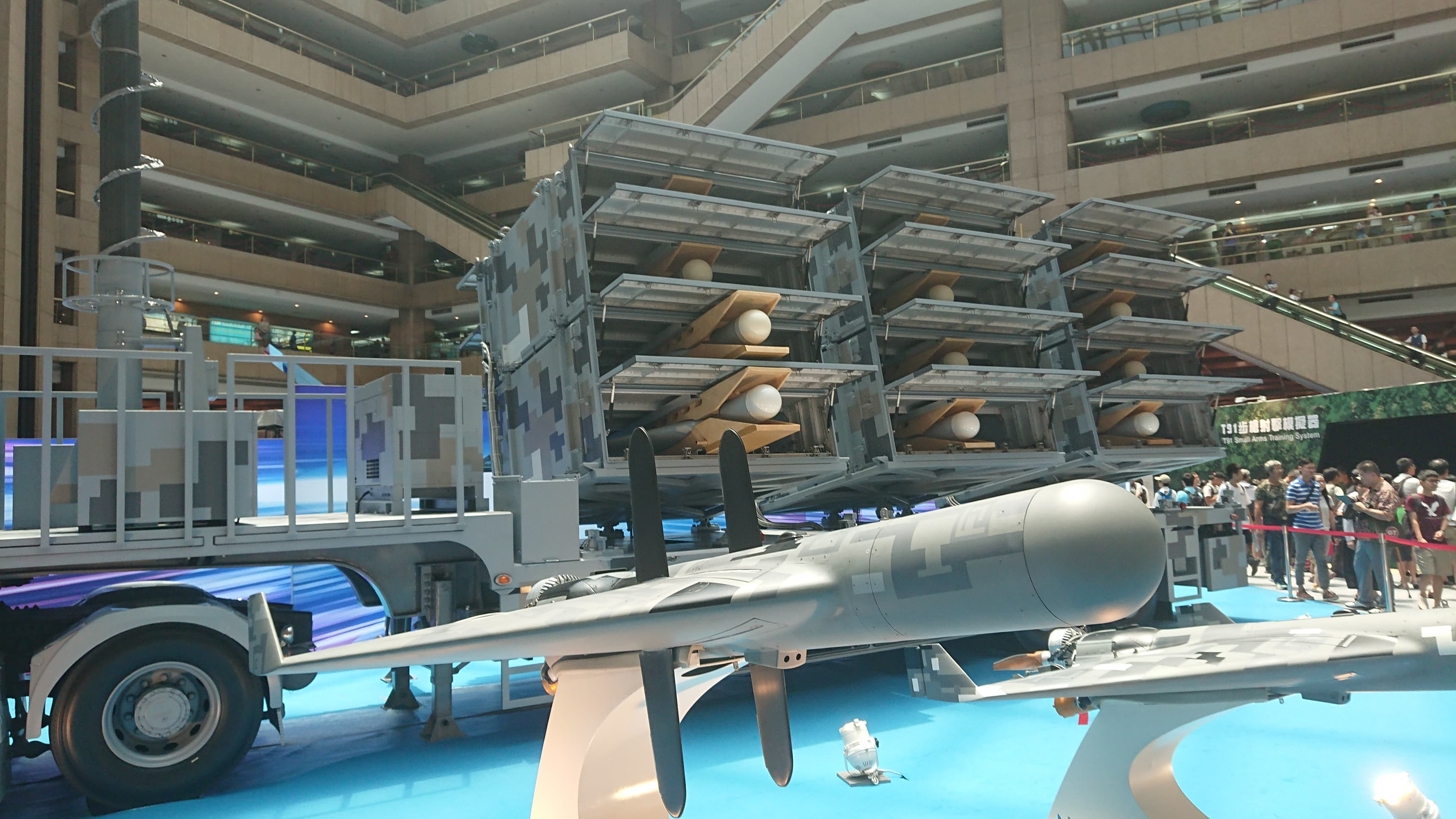
NCSIST Chien Hsiang loitering munition and launcher

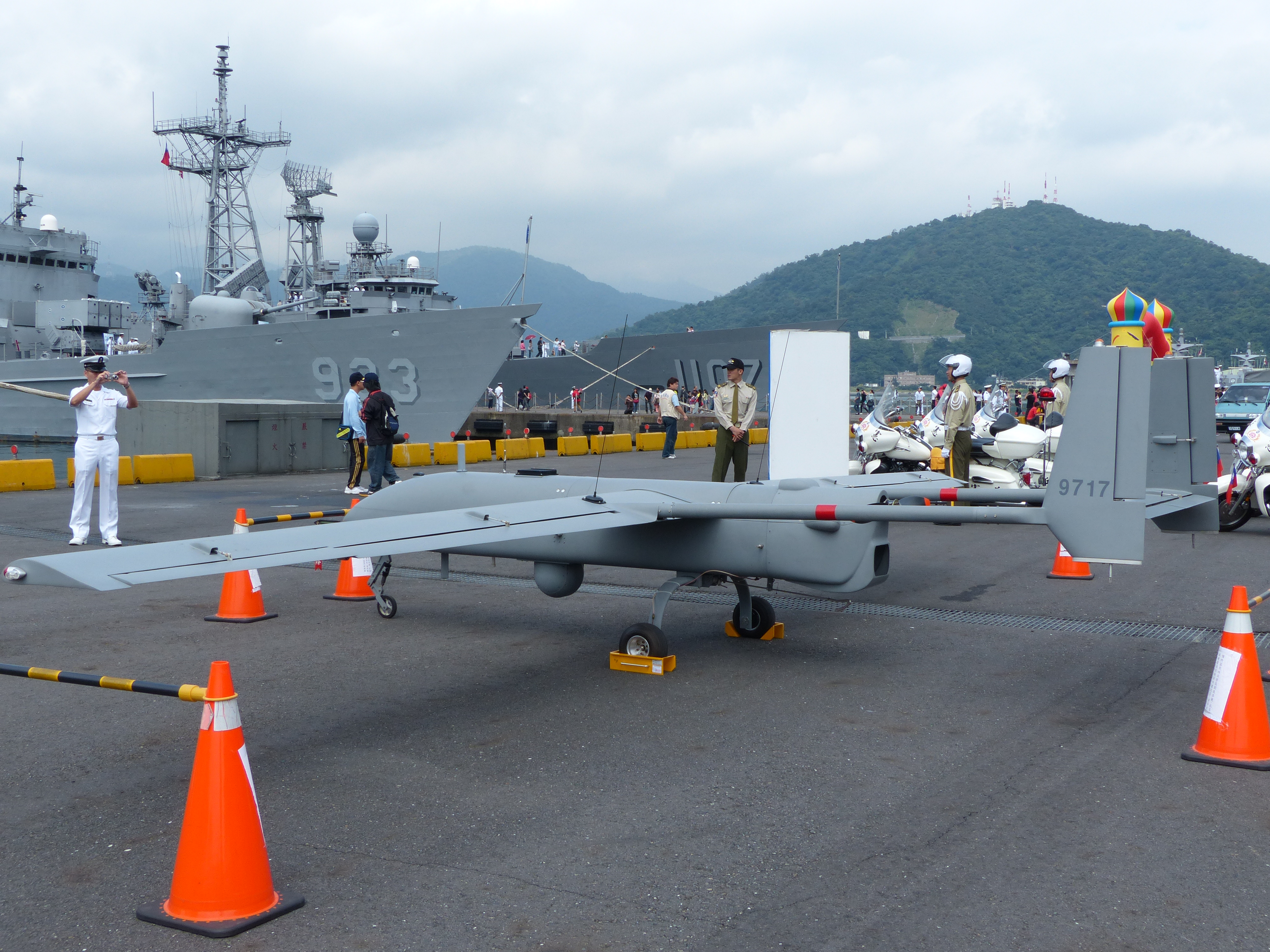
NCSIST Albatross 9717 on display at No.11 Pier

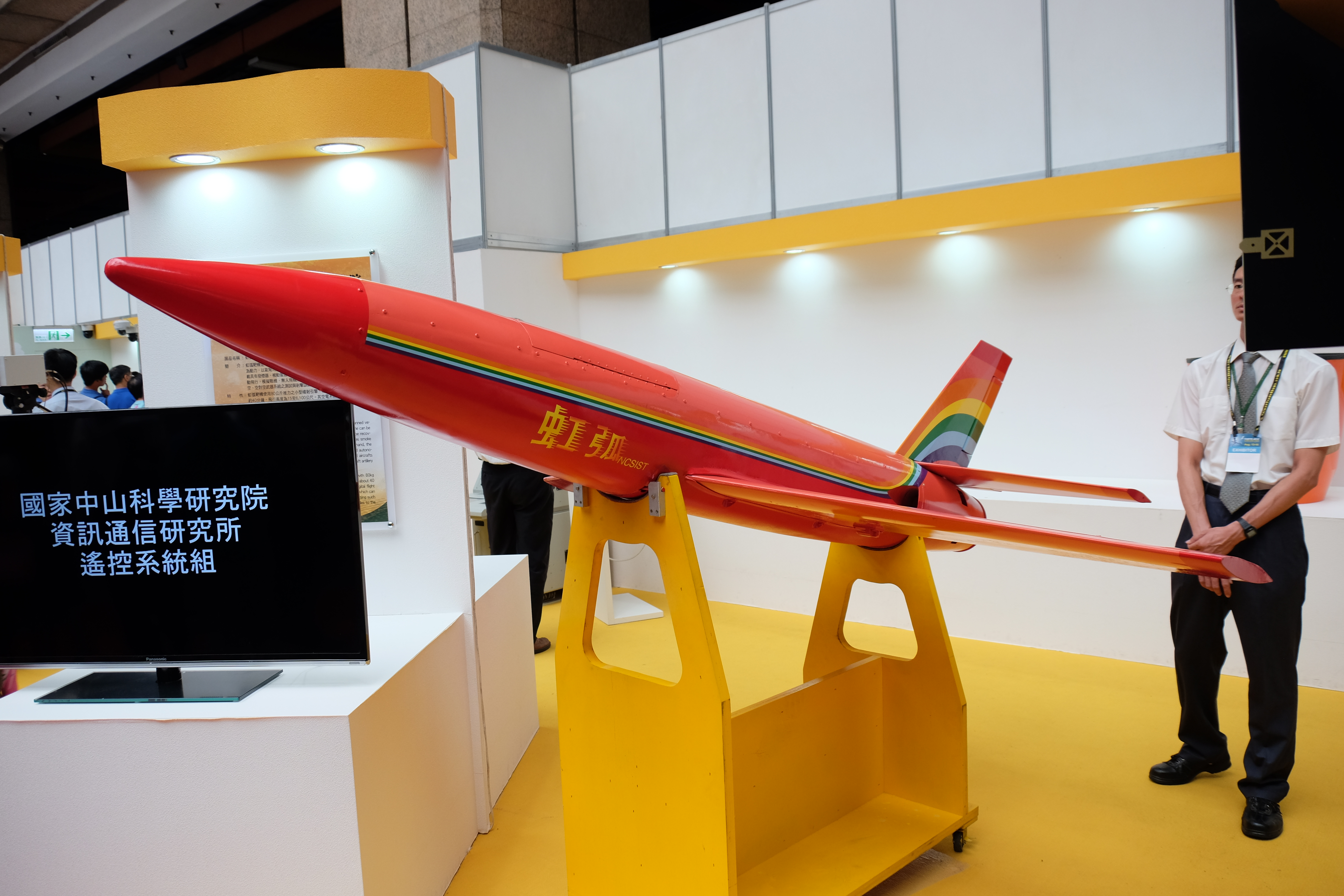
NCSIST Spark Target Drone Display at MND Hall

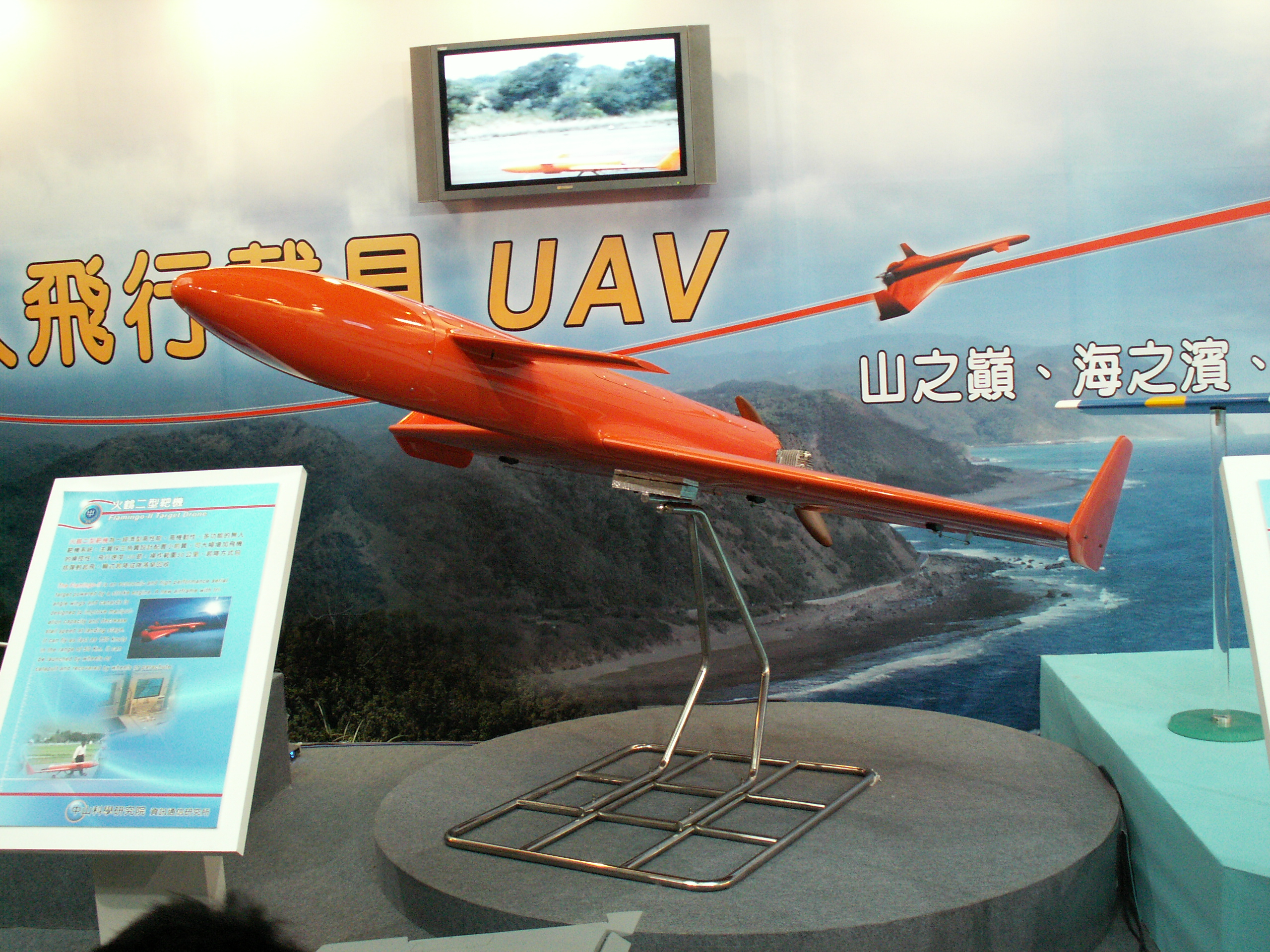
Flamingo II

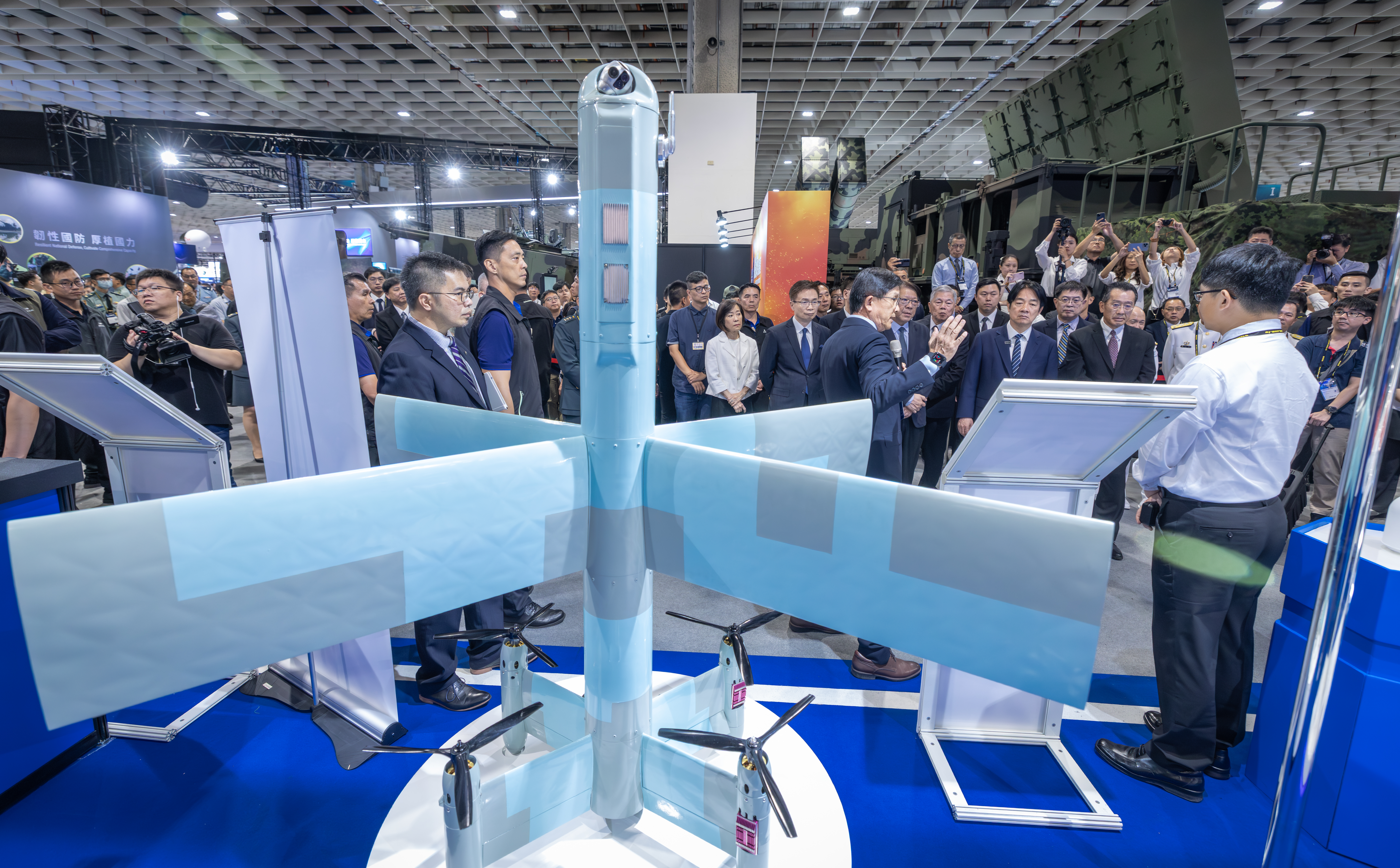
Mighty Hornet III

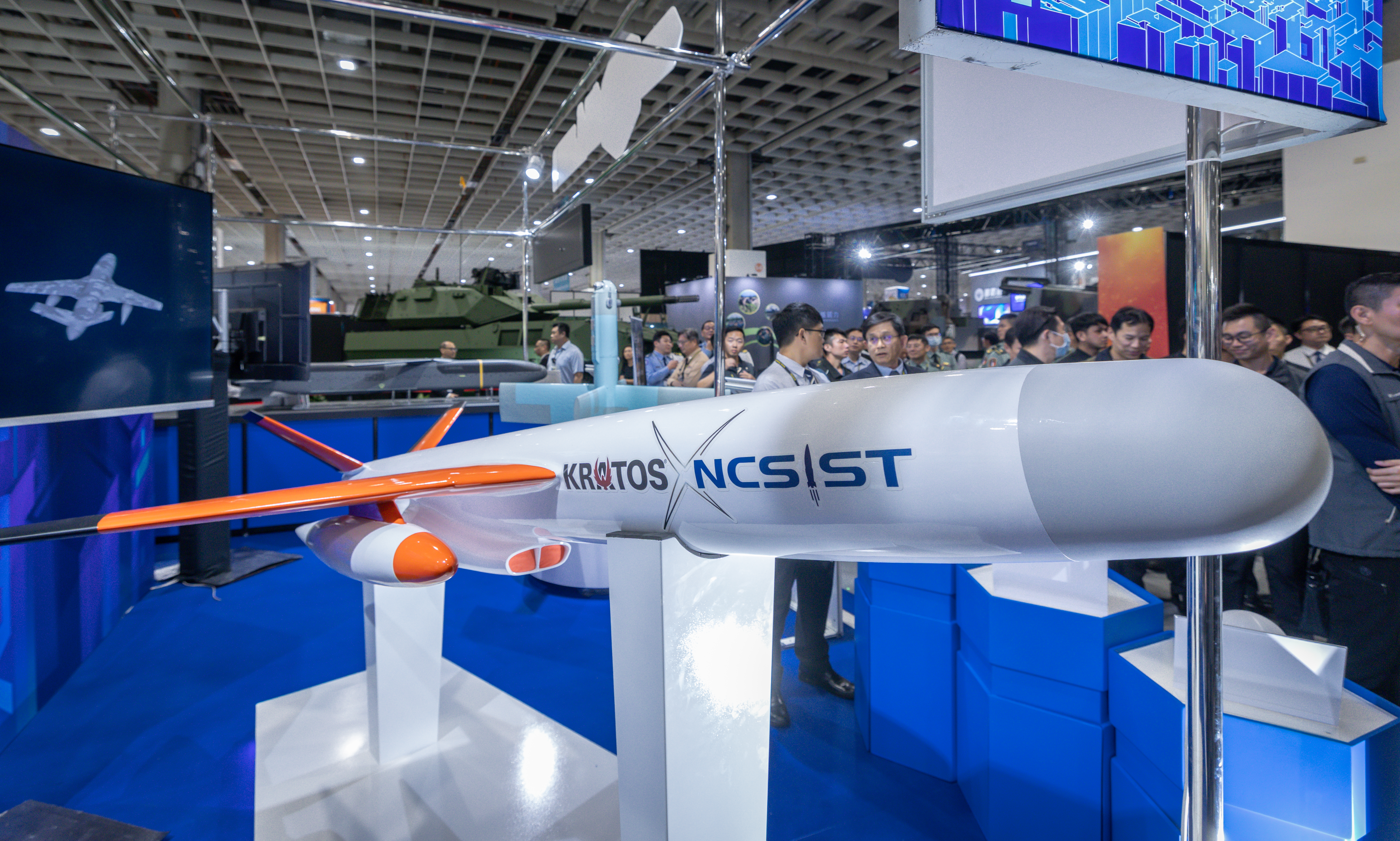
Mighty Hornet IV

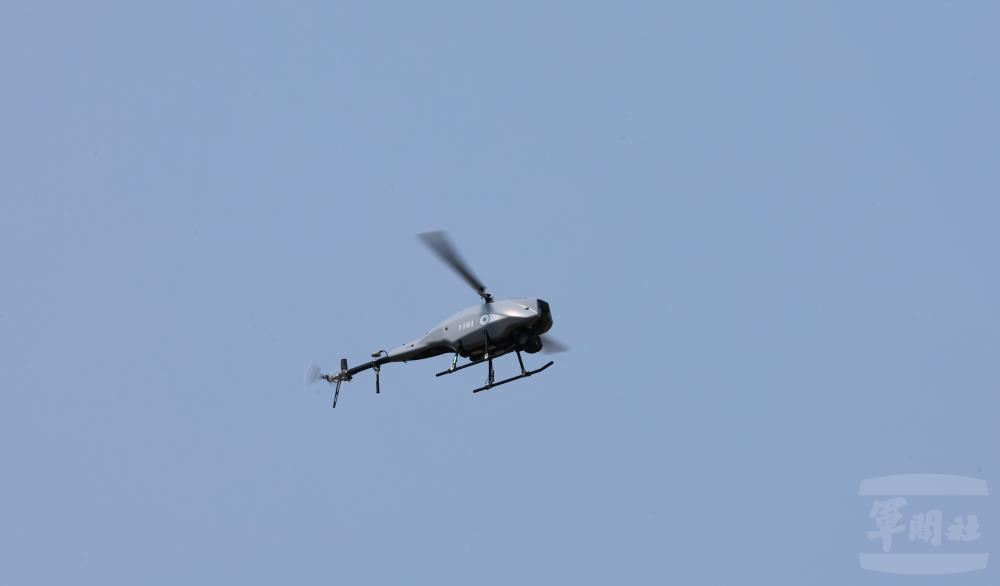
NCSIST Capricorn

=== Missile systems ===
- Hsiung Feng I (HF-1): Surface launched subsonic Anti-ship missile.
- Hsiung Feng II (HF-2): surface launched subsonic anti-ship missile with limited air-to-ground missile capabilities.
- Hsiung Feng IIE (HF-2E): surface launched long range cruise missile system
- Hsiung Feng III (HF-3): surface launched supersonic anti-ship missile.
- Sky Bow (TK): Air defense weapon system, consists of TK-1, TK-2, and TK-3 systems.
  - Sky Bow IV
- Sky Sword I (TC-1): IR guided short range air-to-air missile.
  - Antelope air defence system: road mobile SHORAD system built around the TC-1.
  - Sea Oryx: sea based point defense system built around the TC-1.
- Sky Sword II (TC-2): radar guided medium range air-to-air missile.
- Sky Horse: short range ballistic missile system developed in the 1970s.
- Sky Spear: short range ballistic missile system derived from the TK-2.
- Yun Feng: supersonic surface-to-surface cruise missile.
- Wan Chien: Air-ground cruise missile.
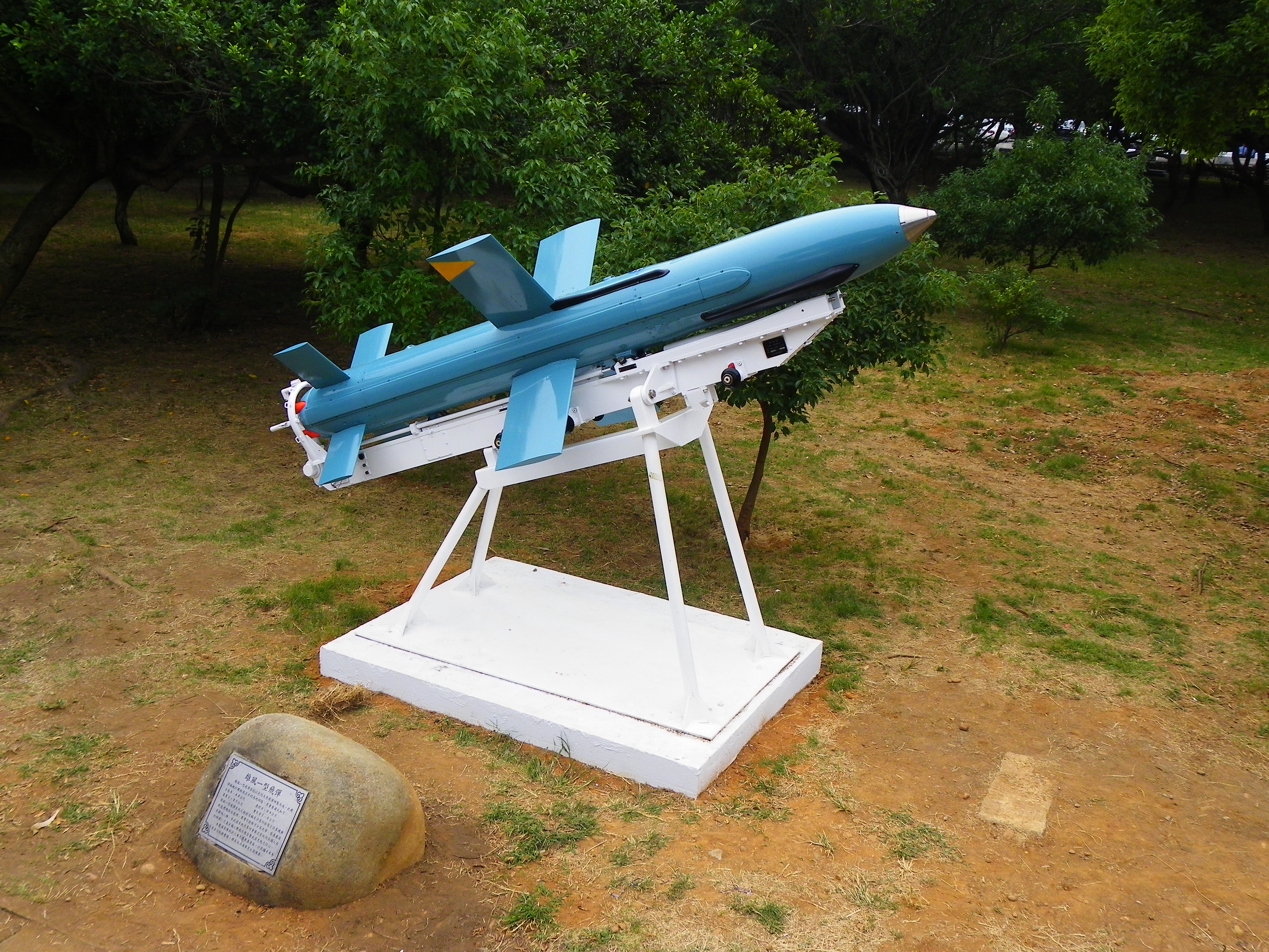
Hsiung Feng I Anti-ship Missile

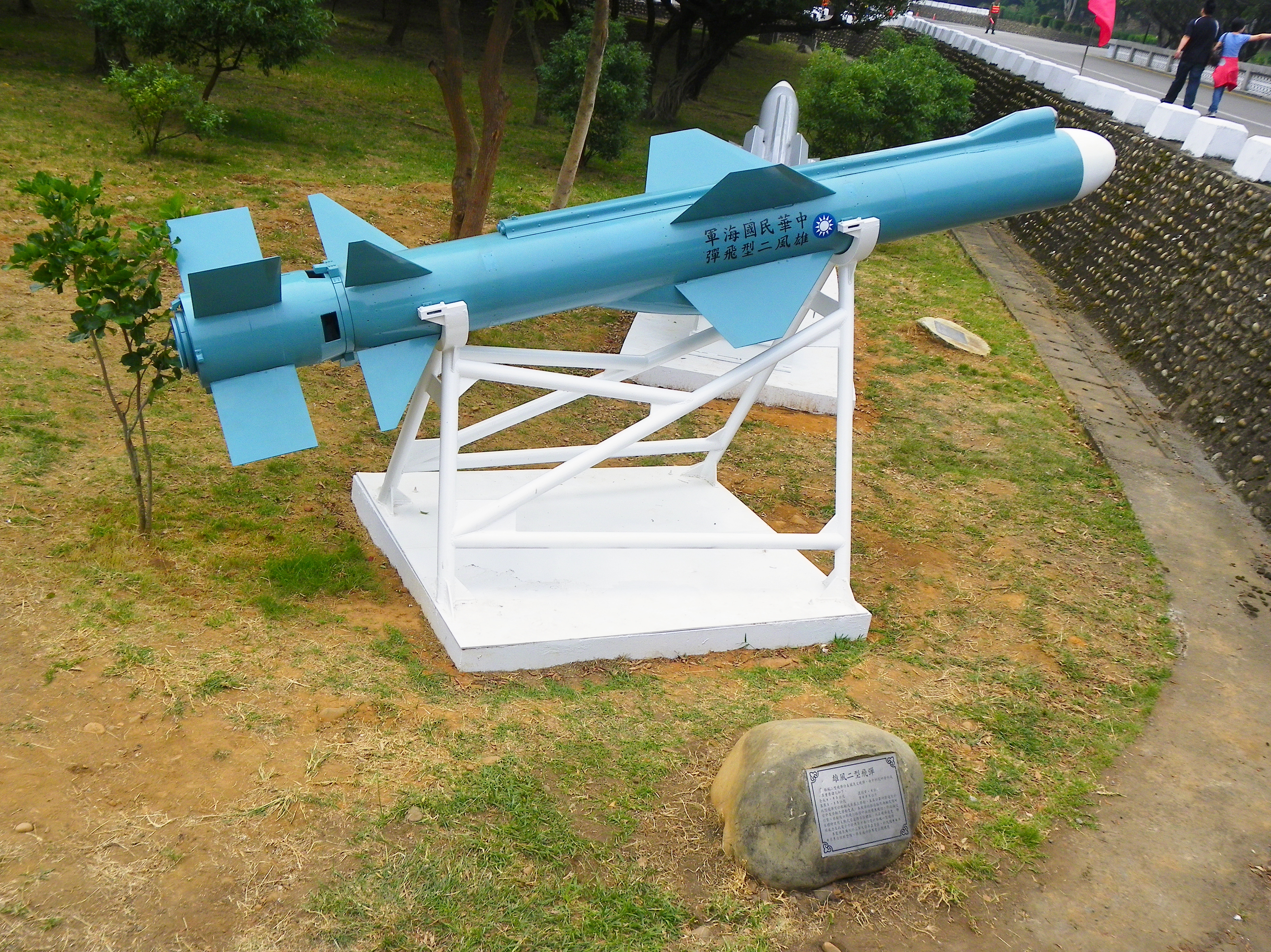
Hsiung Feng II Anti-Ship Missile

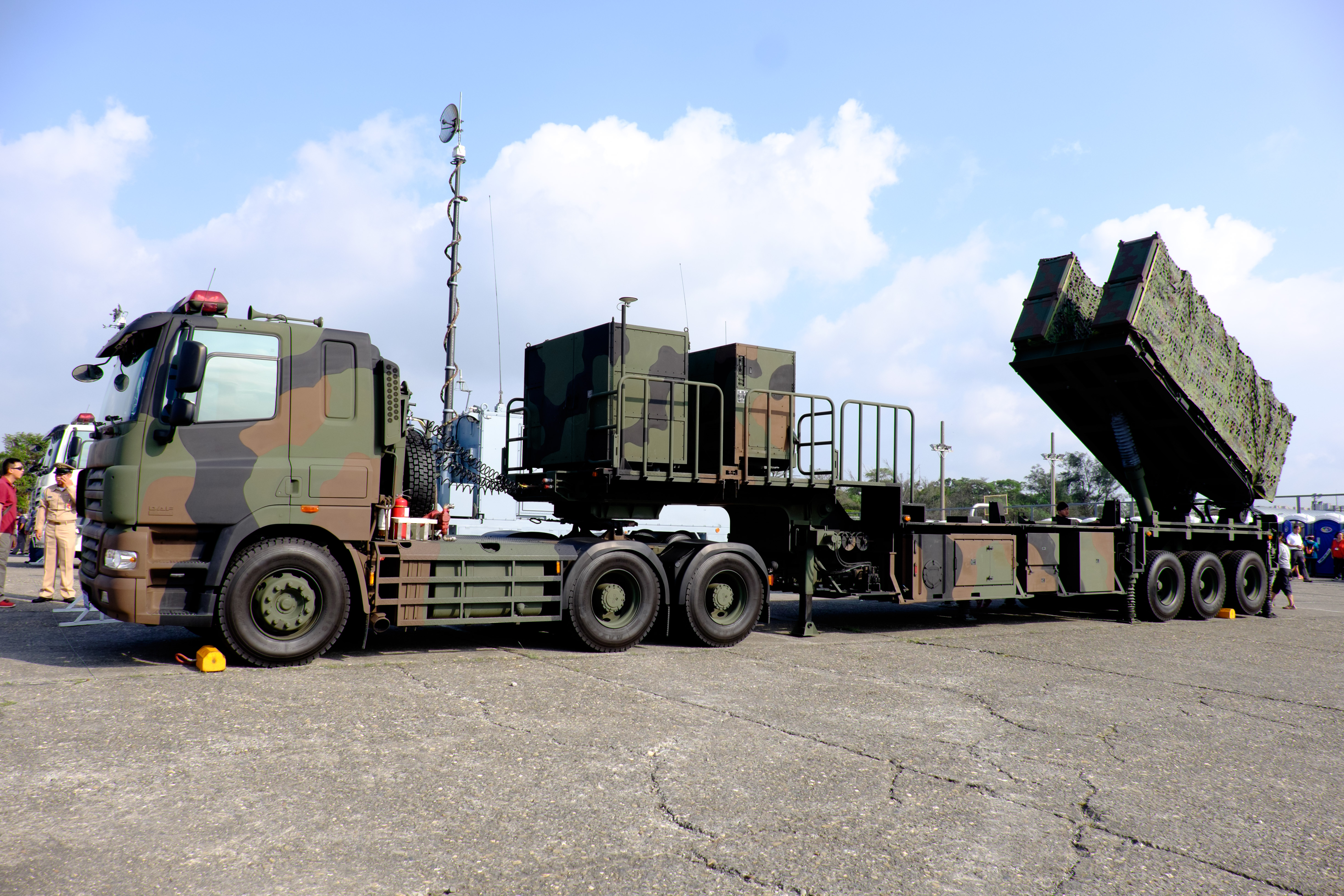
Truck-mounted Hsiung Feng II/Hsiung Feng III anti-ship missile launchers

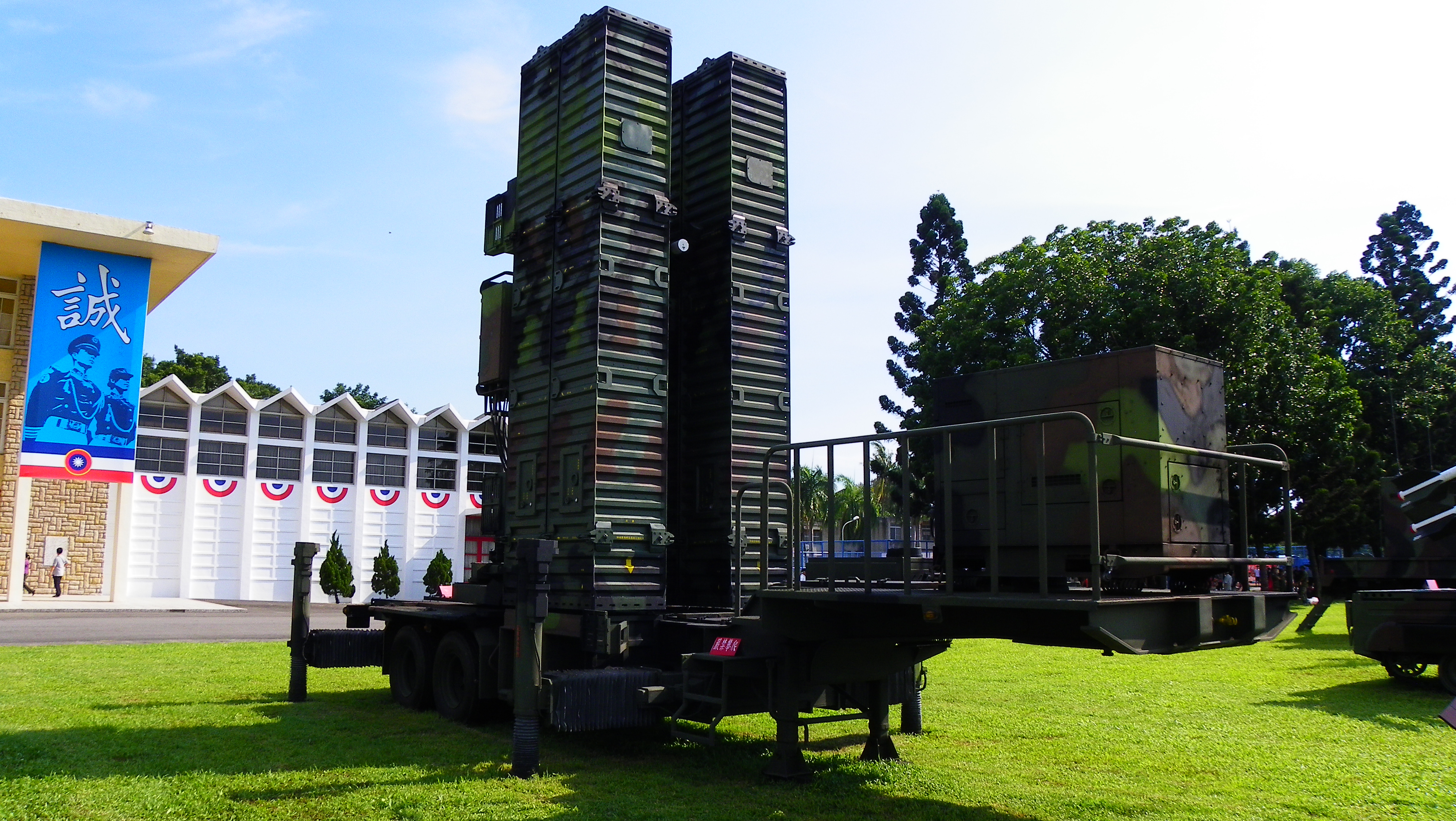
Tien Kung III (TK-3) Missile Launcher Trailer

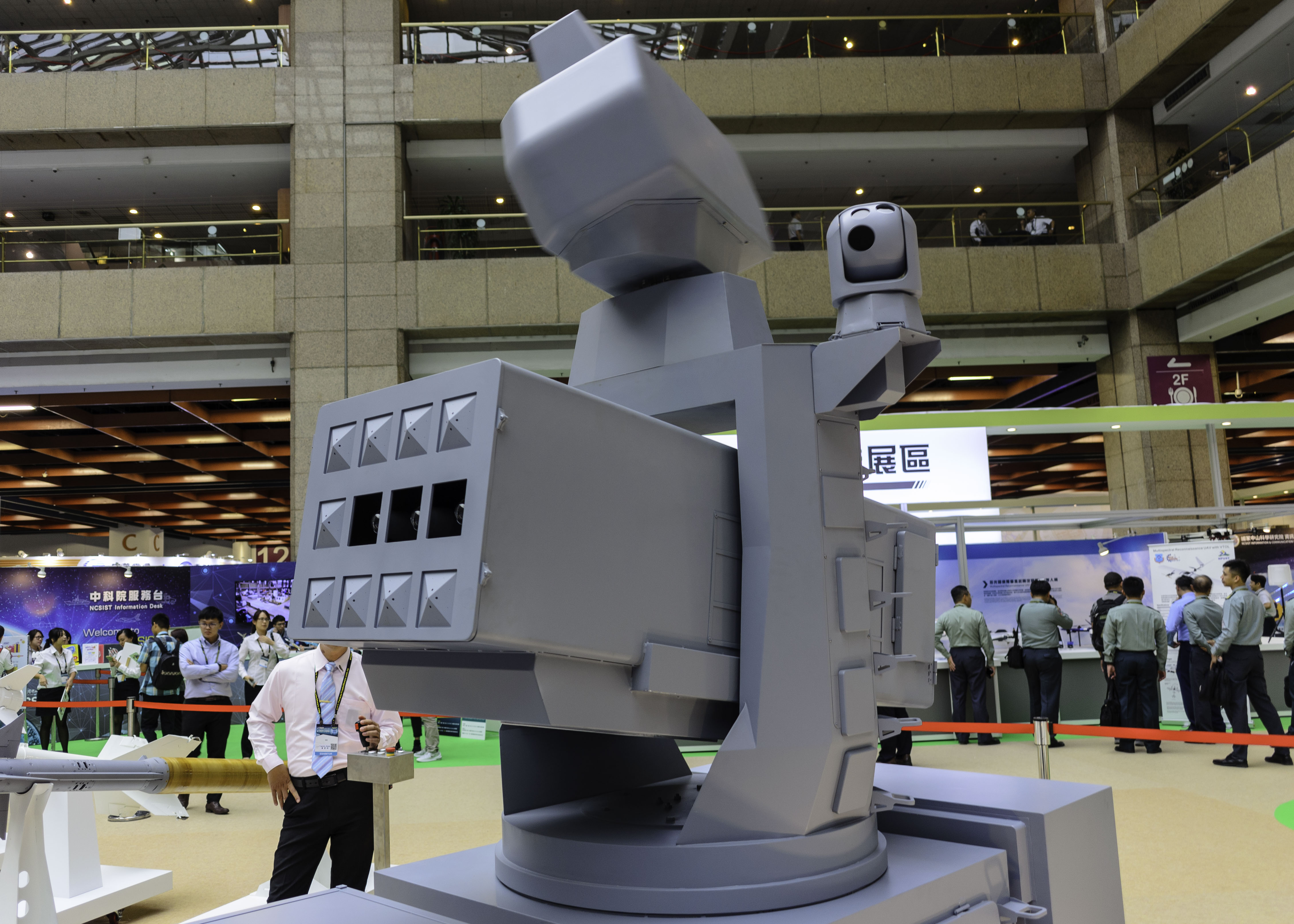
Sea Oryx Missile Launcher

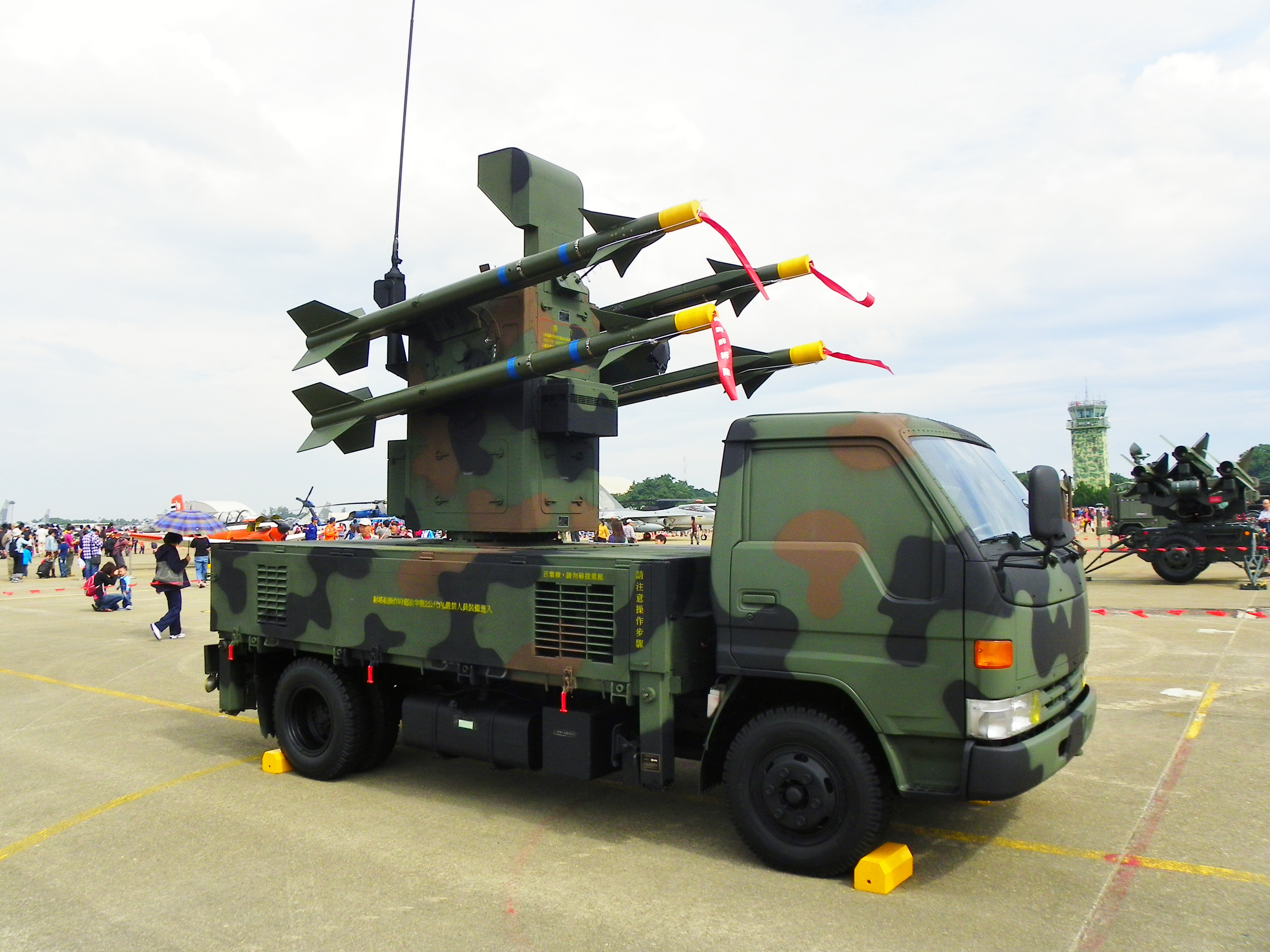
Antelope Air Defense System at CCK Air Force Base

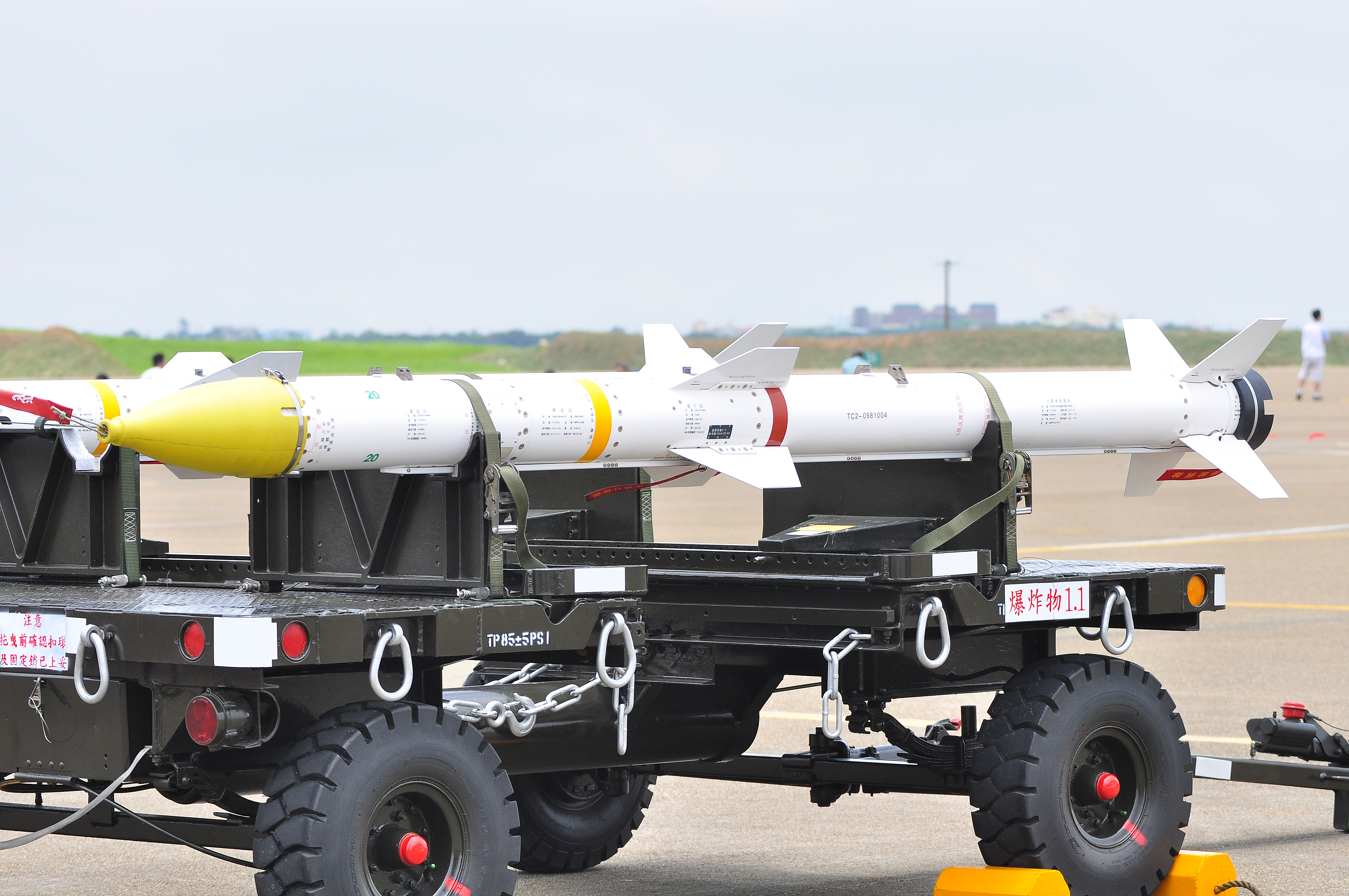
TC-2 (Sky Sword II)

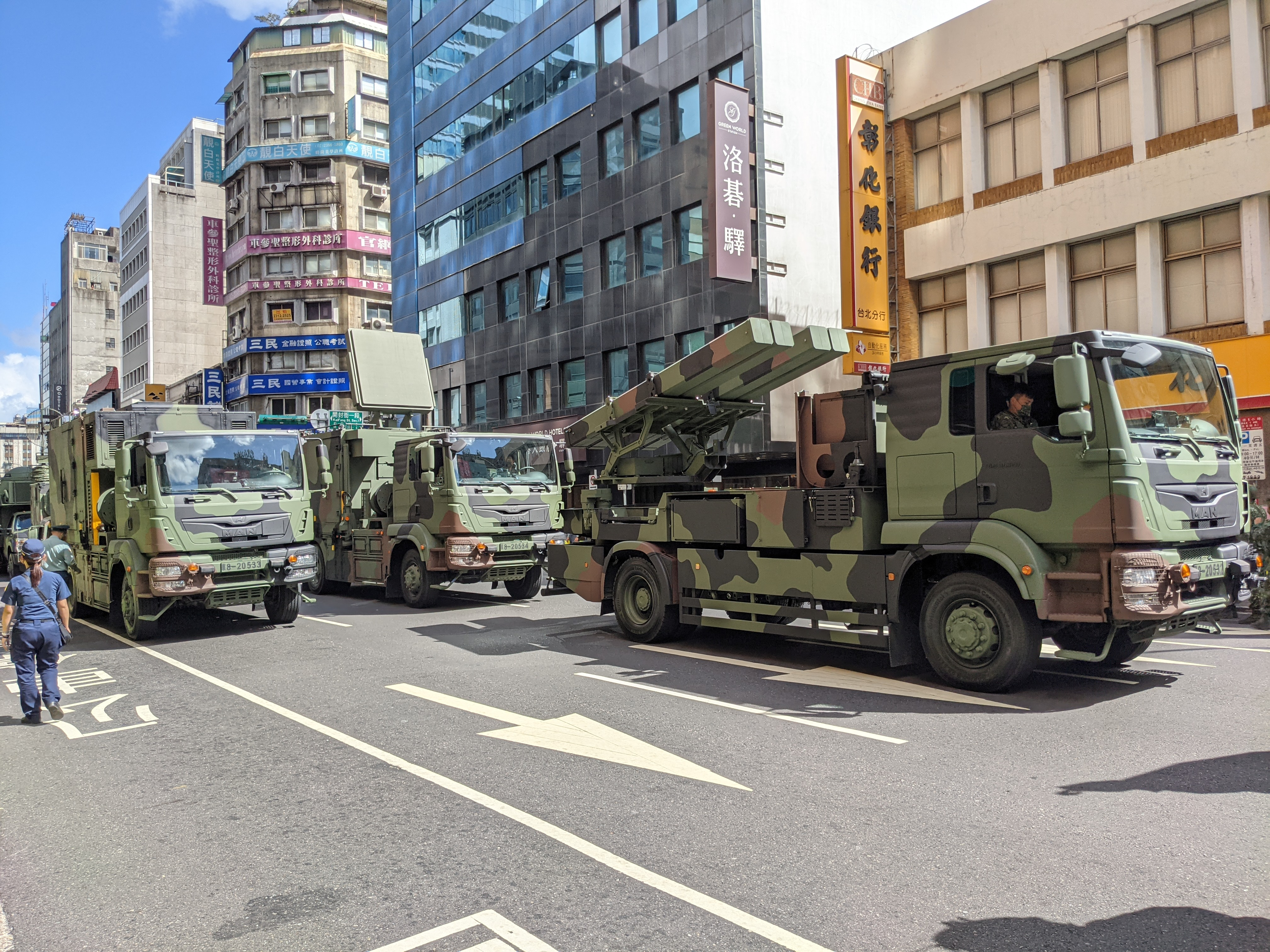
Ground based TC-2 battery

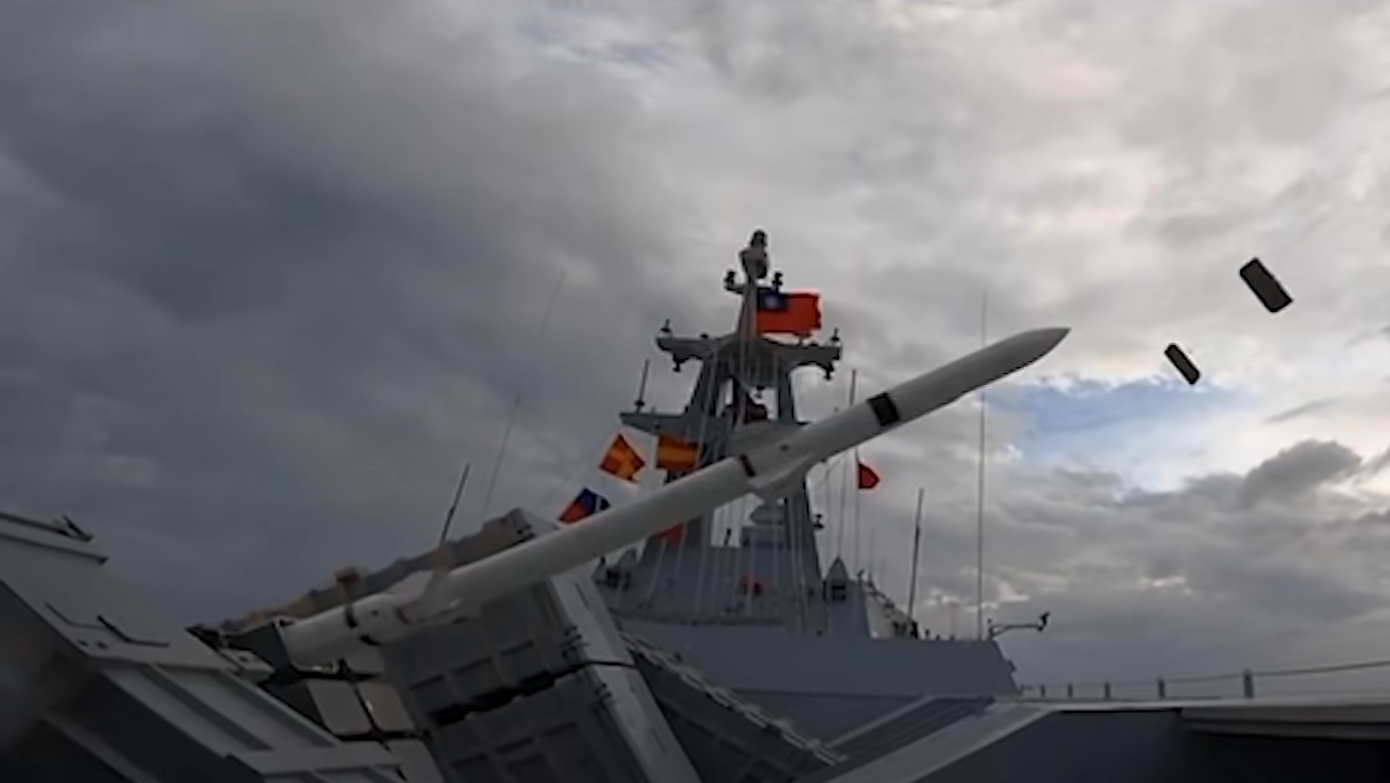
TC-2N missile fired from ROCS Ta Chiang

=== Other weapon systems ===
- Thunderbolt-2000 (LT-2000): locally developed MLRS.
- Kung Feng 6 (KF 6): locally developed MLRS.
- Kestrel: Disposable rocket launcher firing HEAT and HESH projectiles. Development began in 2008. The Kestrel entered service with the ROCMC in 2015. The Kestrel platform is being used as a starting point for the development of an anti-tank guided missile system.
- XTR-101/102: Automatic close-defense 20mm weapon mounts. Prototypes demonstrated in September 2013. Exhibited for the first time in 2015.
- CS/MPQ-90 Bee Eye: short-medium range multifunction AESA radar to support SHORAD batteries. Planned to have a naval role as well.
- Bistatic radar system Two systems entered service in 2018 with mass production to begin in 2020 if they behave favorably in the field. In 2021 a more advanced version was spotted being deployed to Penghu.
- AV2 Long-range Chaff Rocket: Chaff rocket for ship self defense.
- NCSIST 2.75in rockets remote weapon station
- 2.75in rocket: 2.75 inch aerial rocket for use aboard AH-64, OH-58D, F-5E/F, F-16, P-3 Orion, etc. Two variants, Mk4 and Mk66.
- CAPTOR mine: Designated No. 1 Wan Xiang CAPTOR Mine. CAPTOR mines contain a torpedo and a targeting system.
- Bottom mine: Designated No. 2 Wan Xiang Bottom Mine. A remote controlled or passive mine designed to sit on the bottom. Designated WSM-II, smart mine for use in deep water.
- Moored mine: A remote or automatic mine designed to be moored to the bottom and float in the current.
- Soft kill drone UAV defense system
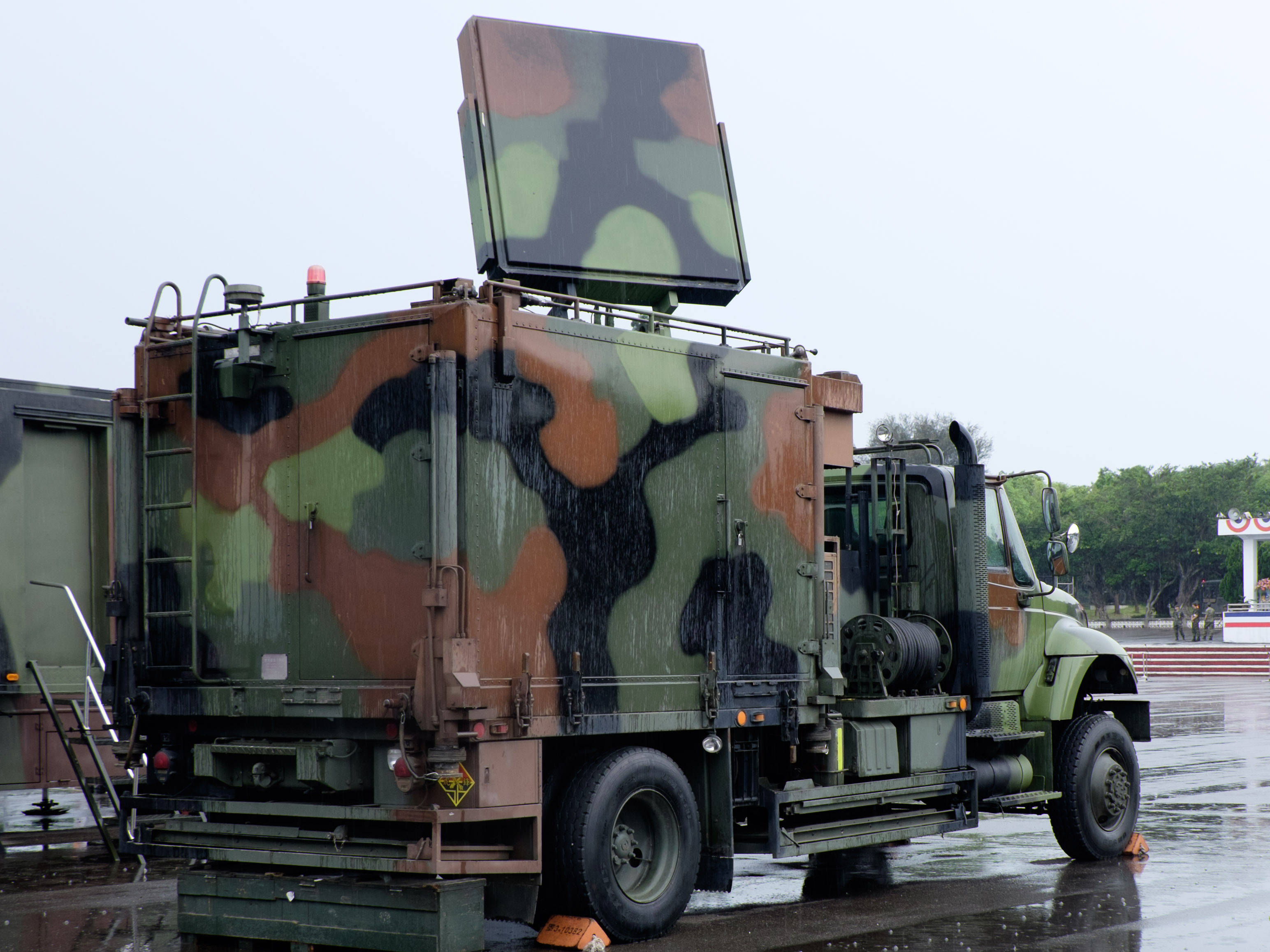
Short range AESA radar system (CS/MPQ-90 Bee Eye)

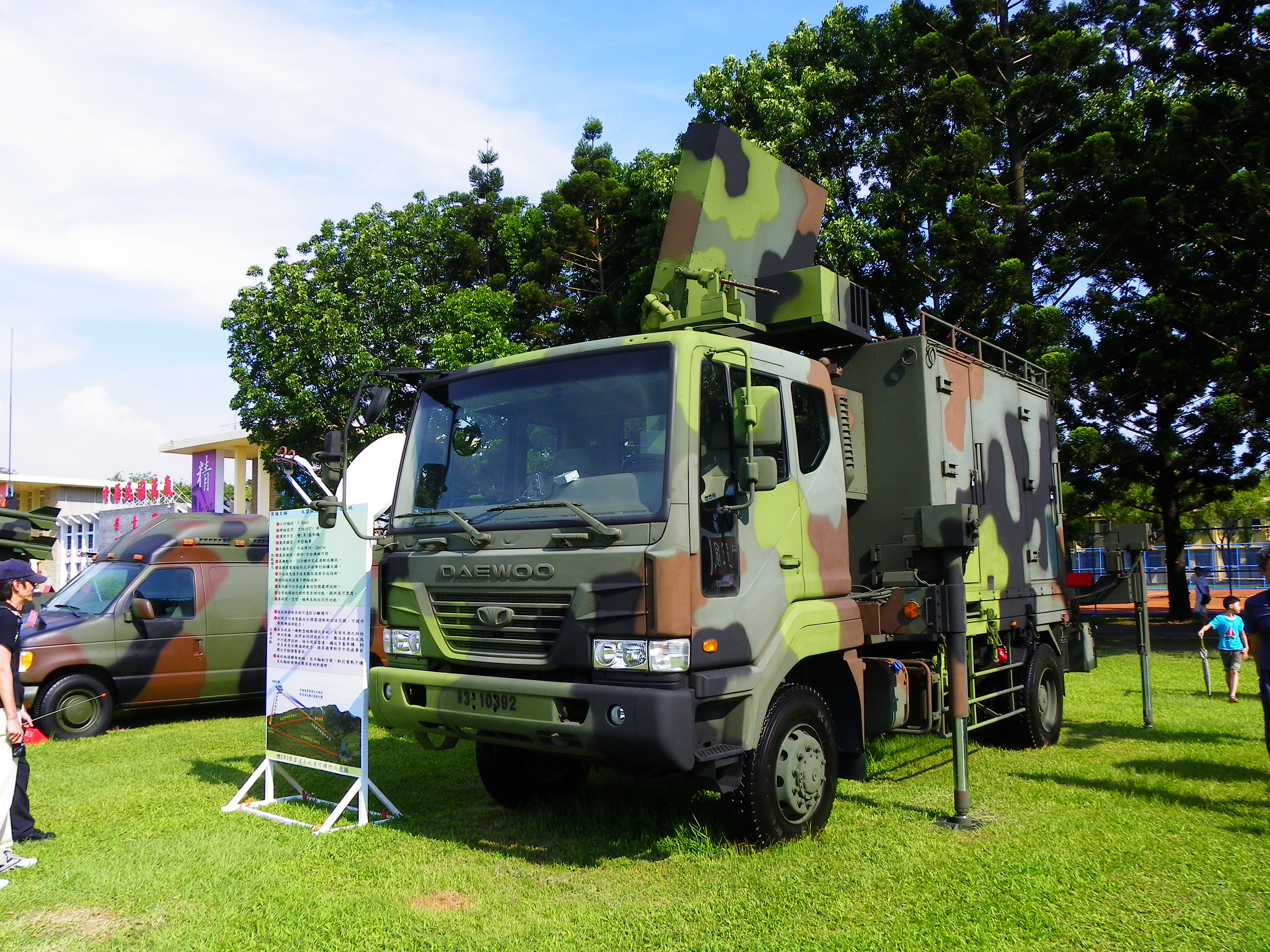
Bistatic Radar Passive Receiver System Display at Military Academy Ground

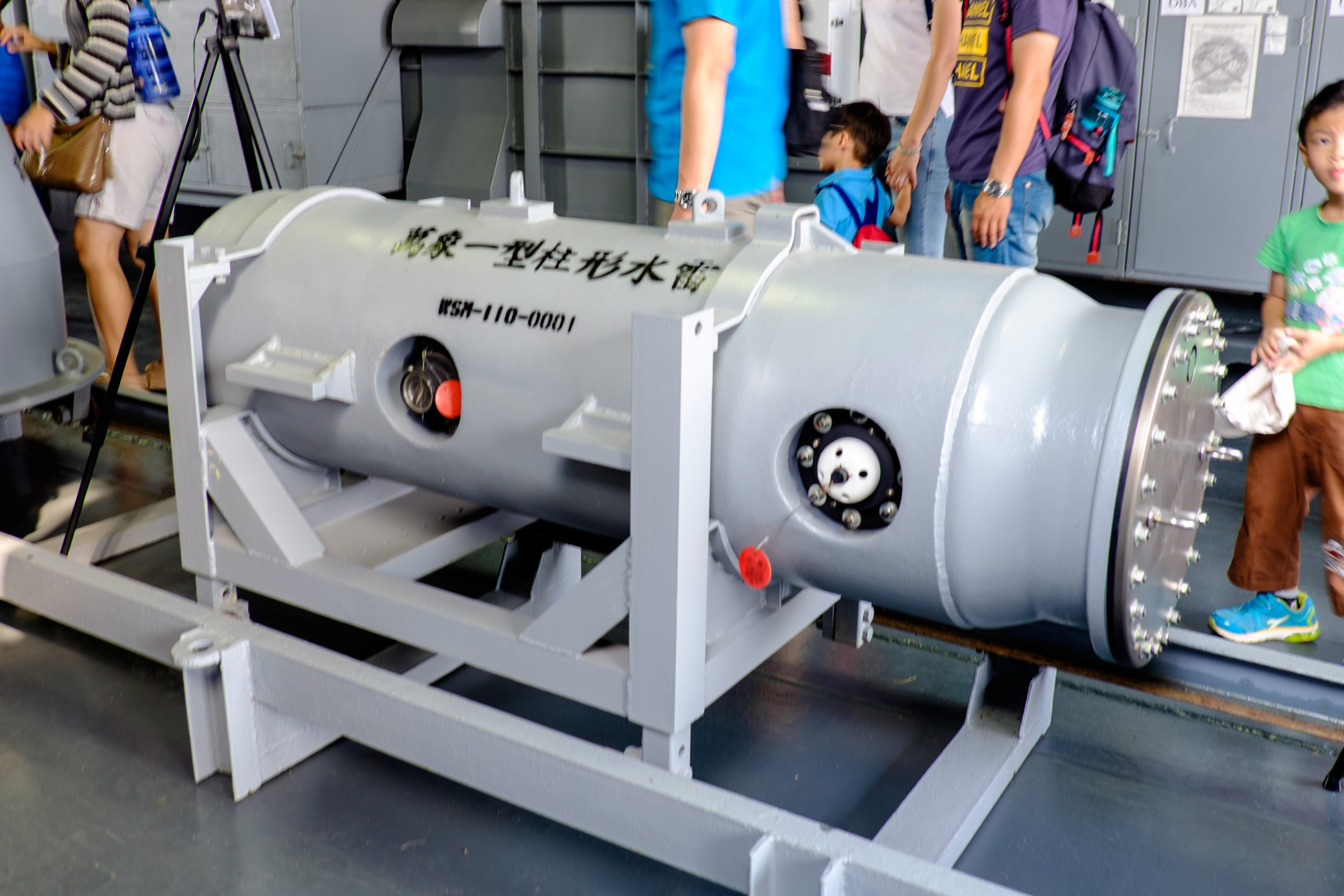
No.1 Wan Xiang CAPTOR Mine

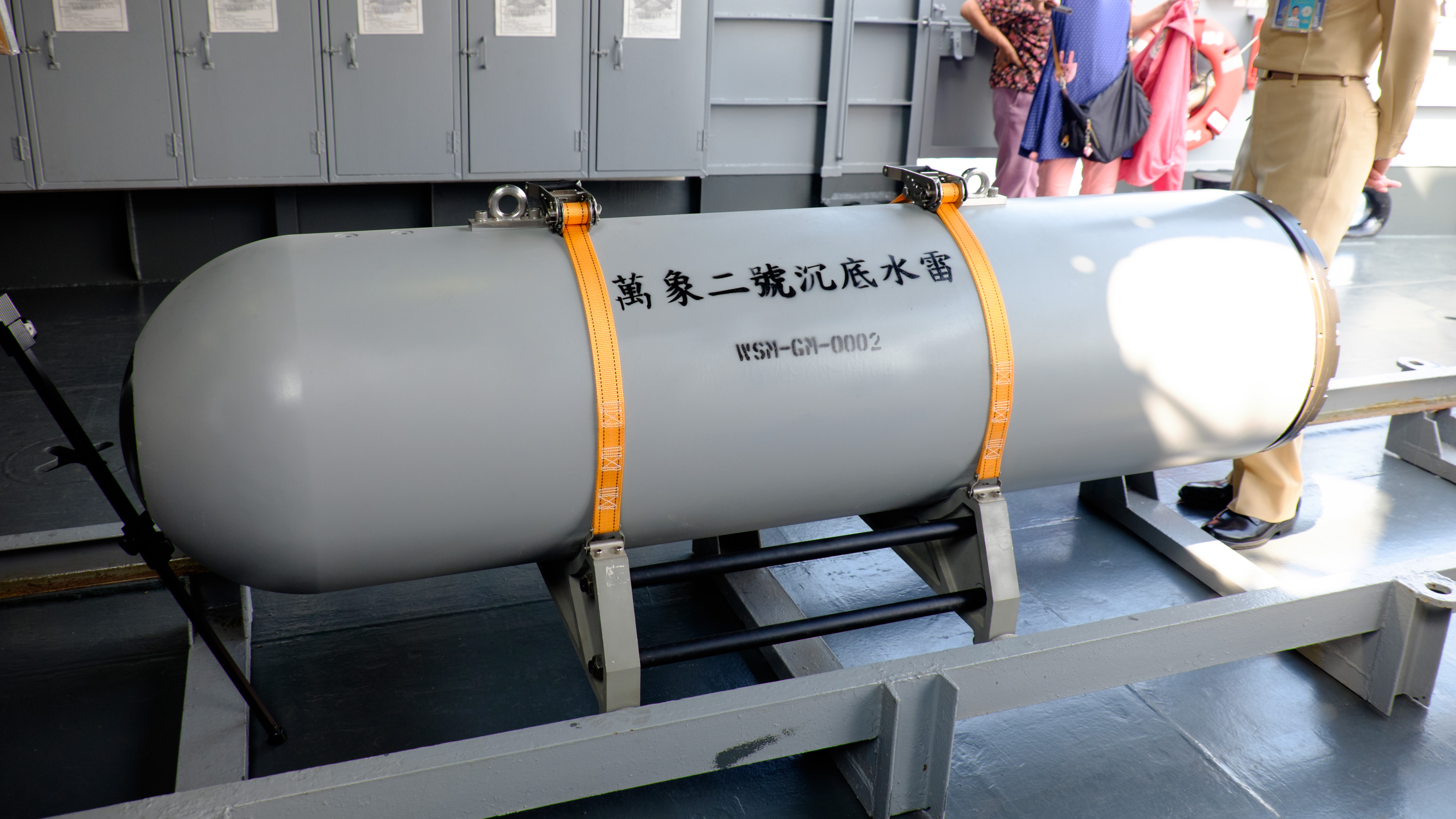
No.2 Wan Xiang Bottom Mine

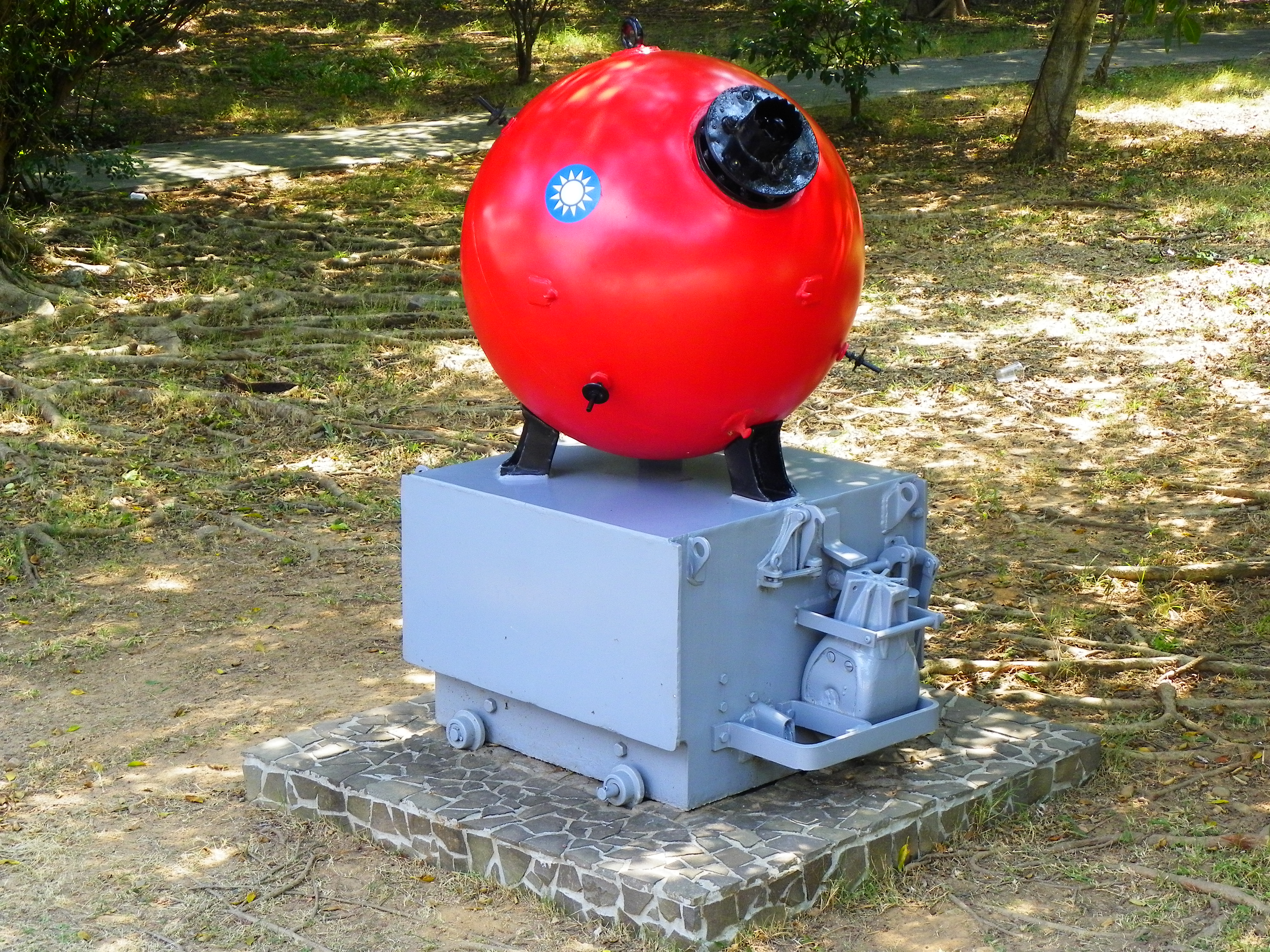
MK.6 Mine

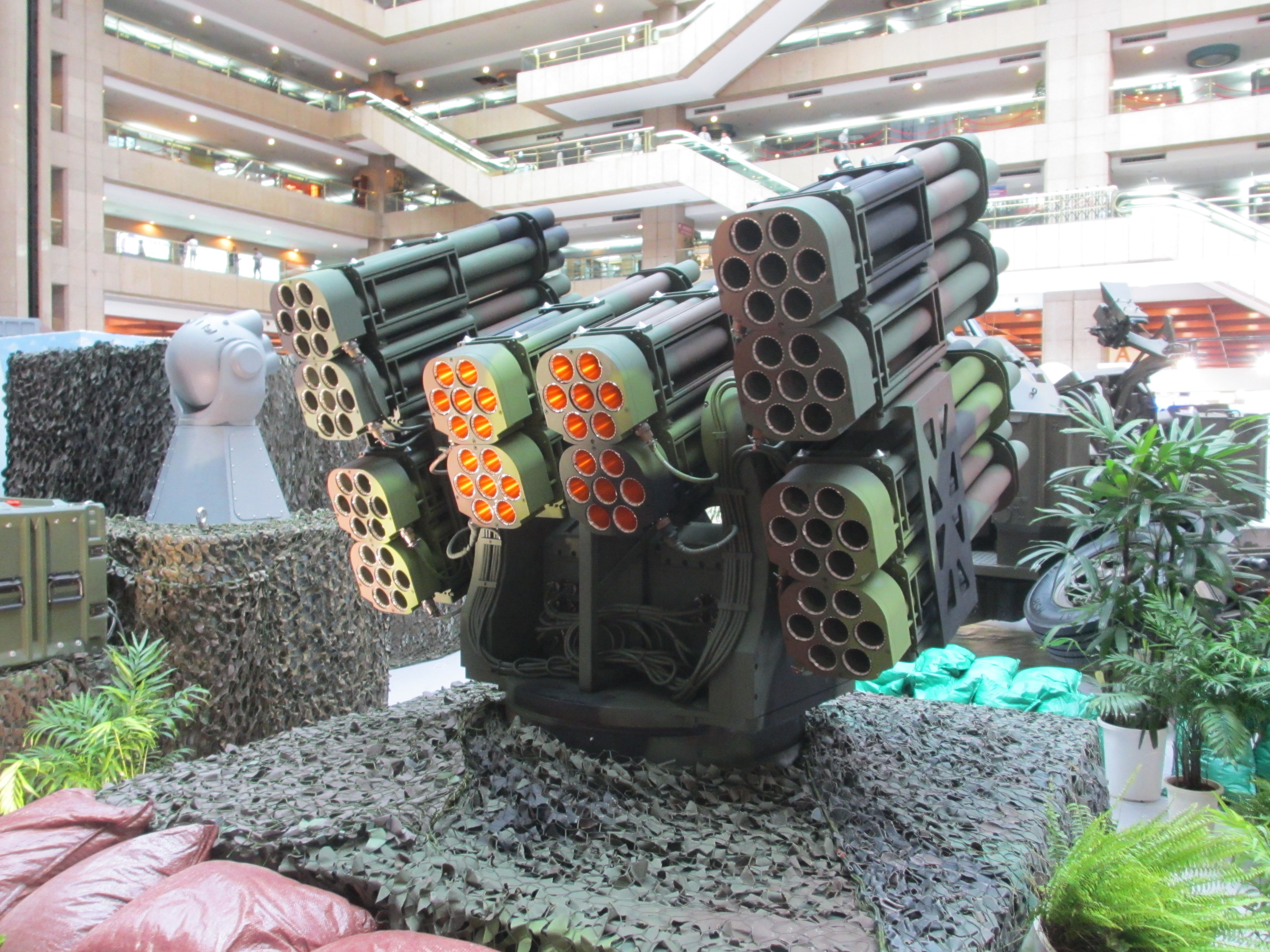
Coastal defense variant of the NCSIST 2.75in rockets remote weapon station

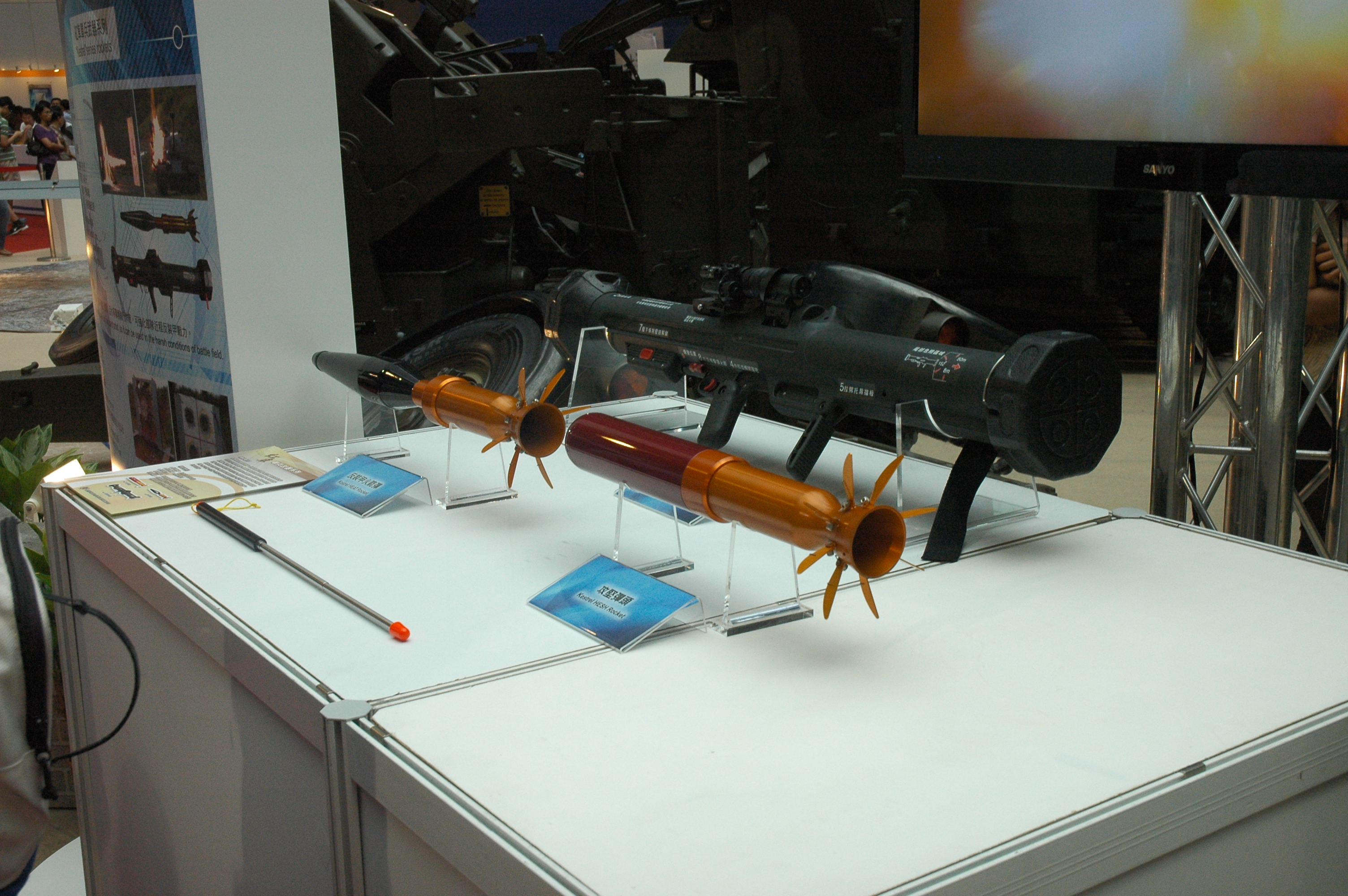
Kestrel anti tank rocket

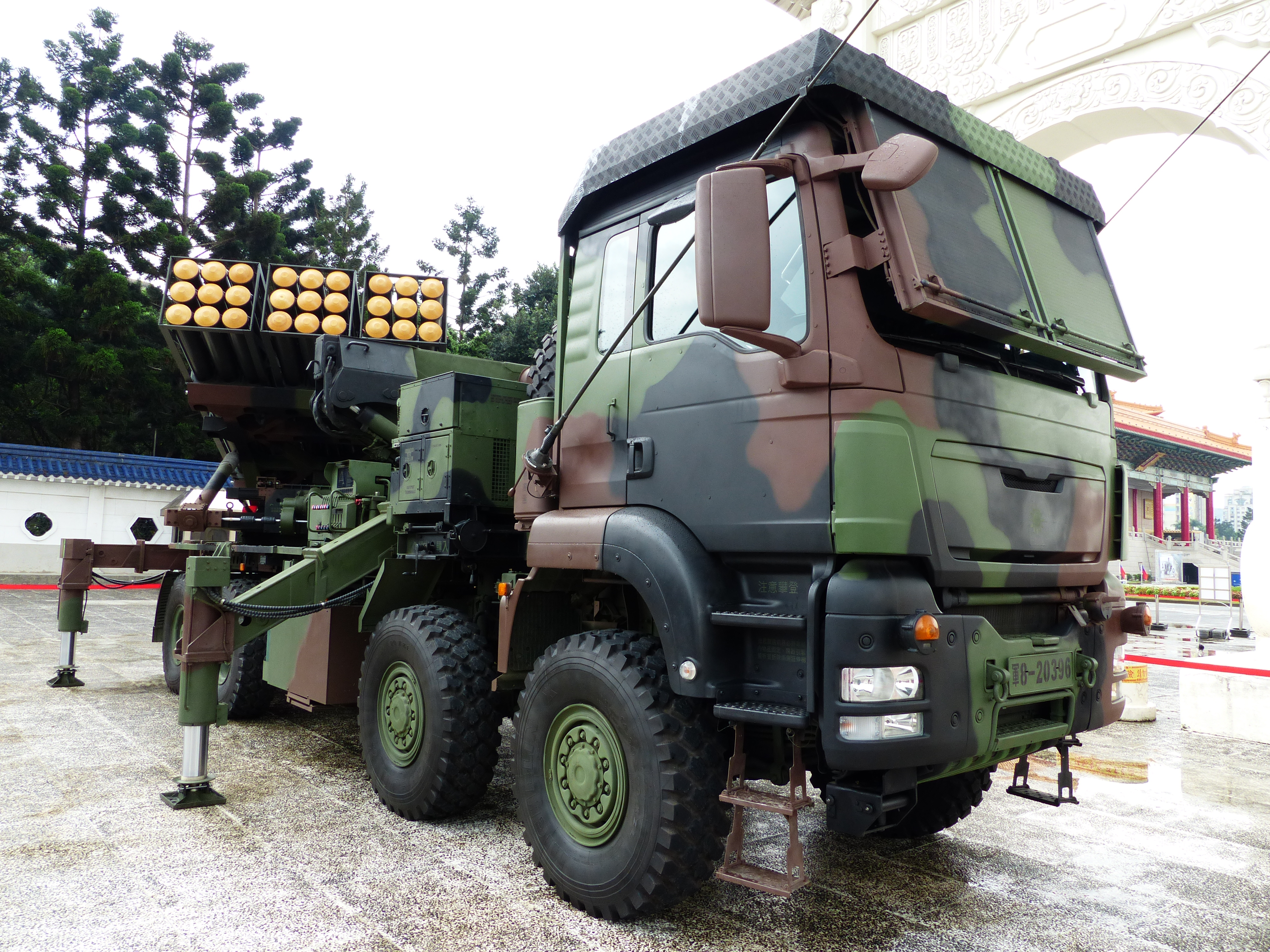
Thunderbolt-2000 MLRS Display at CKS Memorial Hall

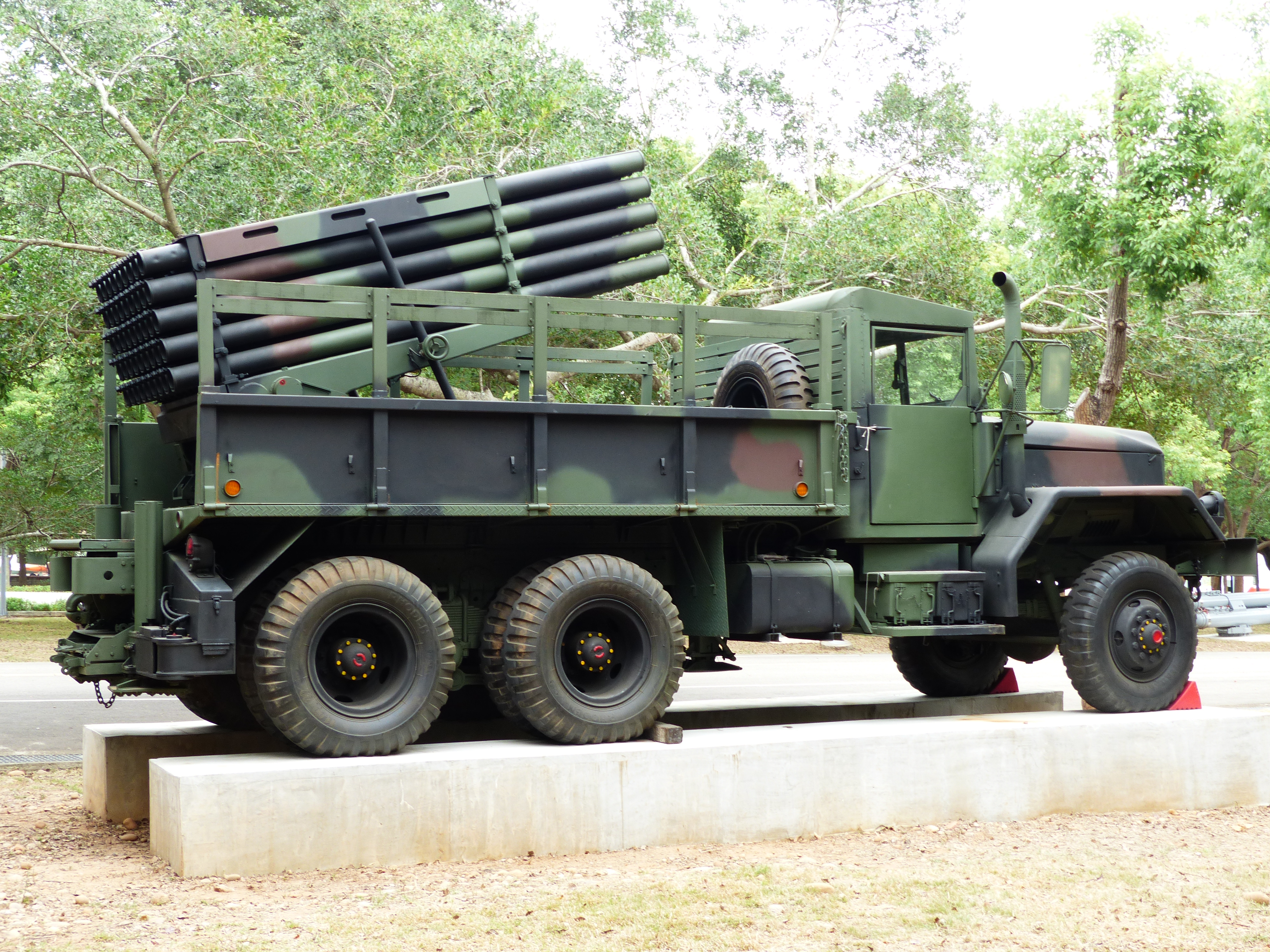
Kung Feng VI multiple launch rocket system

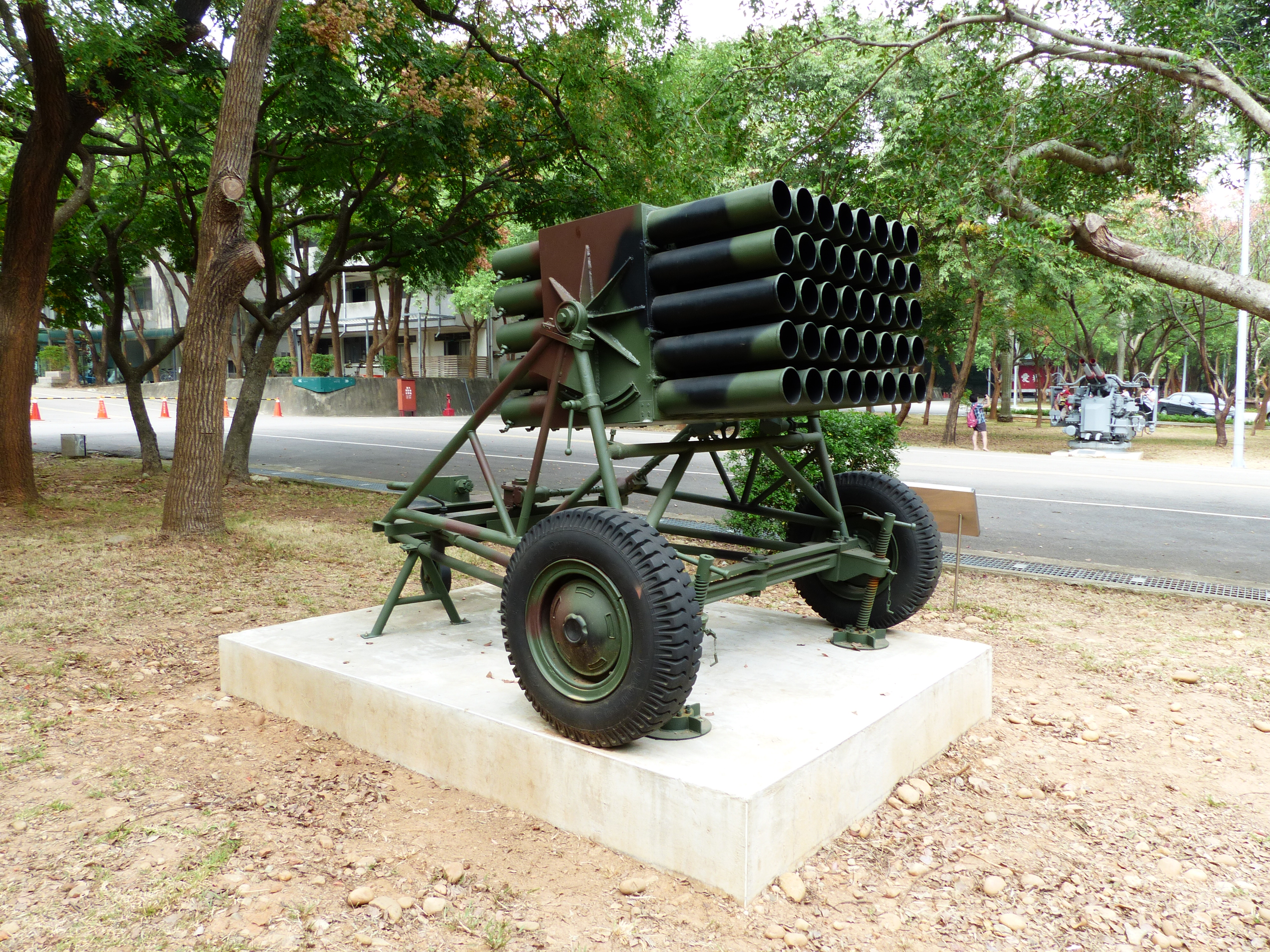
Kung Feng IV multiple launch rocket system

== Civilian and non-weapon systems ==
- Sensor system for the Resource Prospector lunar rover mission. Cancelled in 2018. The instruments will be flown aboard the Commercial Lunar Payload Services missions in the 2020s.
- SG100 Cloud Computer for the International Space Station designed and manufactured in collaboration with Academia Sinica and National Central University under contract for NASA. It was launched to the space station in 2017.
- High speed rail simulator developed with Taiwan High Speed Rail. Based on aircraft simulator technology the system can simulate natural disasters such as typhoons and earthquakes.
- Civilian air traffic control radar: NCSIST has partnered with British firm Easat Radar Systems to pursue dual use projects using NCSIST's proprietary radar technology.
- Major components for the European Extremely Large Telescope (E-ELT), first prototype segments delivered in 2020.
- The Band-1 sensor for the Atacama Large Millimeter/submillimeter Array (ALMA)
- Powered exoskeleton, initially for military use
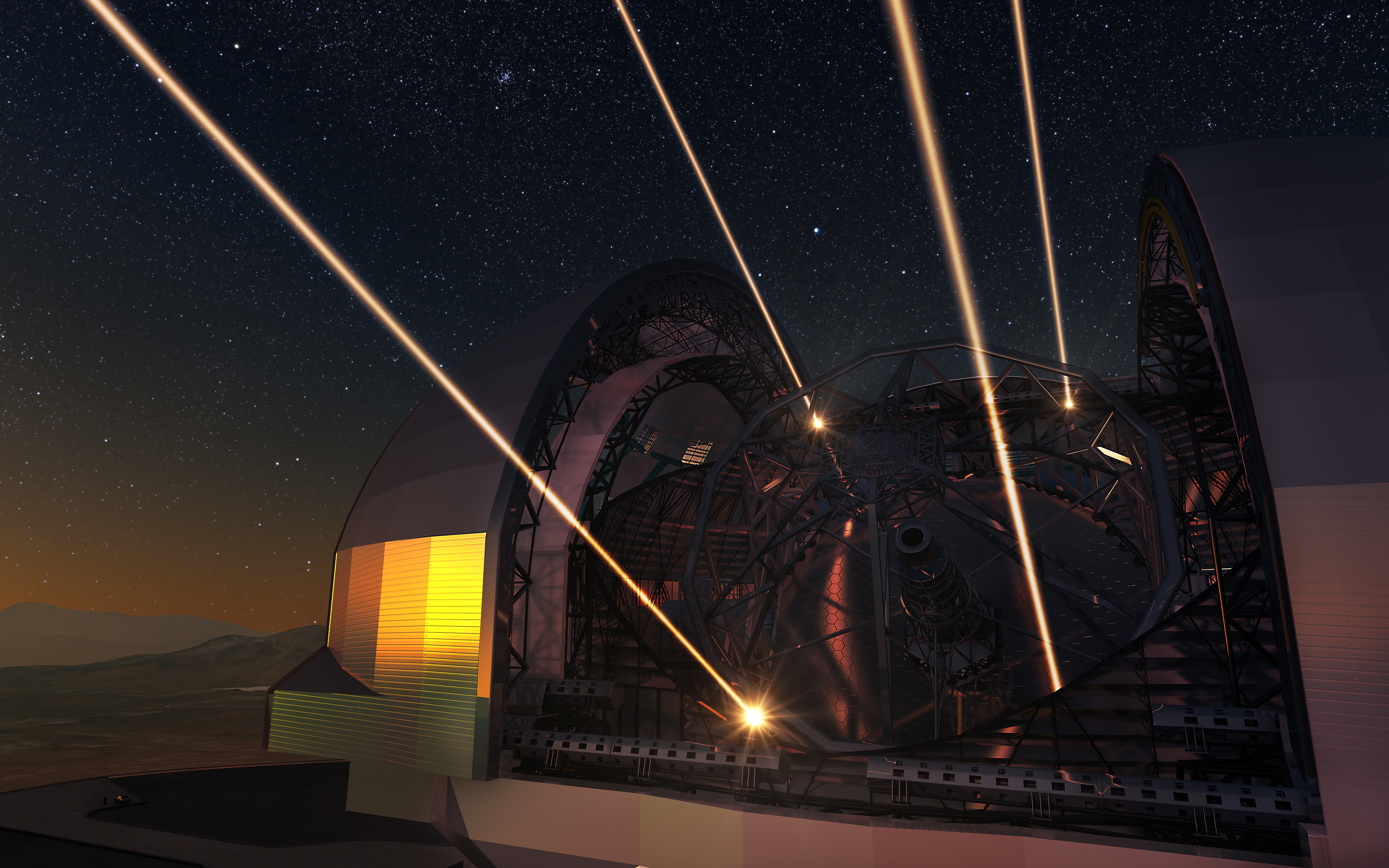
Artist's impression of the European Extremely Large Telescope deploying lasers for adaptive optics

== Organization ==
The institute is divided into six research divisions and five centers. Research divisions pursue both project oriented and basic scientific research.

=== Research divisions ===
- Aeronautical Systems
- Missile and Rocket Systems
- Information and Communications
- Chemical Systems
- Materials and Electro-Optics
- Electronic Systems

=== Centers ===
- System Development
- System Manufacturing
- Systems Sustainment
- Integrated Logistical Support
- Dual-Use Technology Development

=== Locations ===
NCSIST facilities are located in Taoyuan (four facilities), New Taipei City, Taichung City, Kaohsiung, and Pingtung County.

In 2022 a locally designed propellant factory at the NCSIST's Jiupeng complex in Pingtung was completed. The facility allows for increased production of missiles and rockets.

== See also ==
- Automotive Research & Testing Center
- Industrial Technology Research Institute
- National Space Organization
- List of companies of Taiwan
- Defense industry of Taiwan

=== Similar organizations ===
- Agency for Defense Development - South Korea
- Defense Advanced Research Projects Agency - United States
- Defence Industry Agency - Turkey
- Defence Research and Development Organisation - India
- Defence Technology Institute - Thailand
- Military Institute of Armament Technology - Poland
- Rafael Advanced Defense Systems - Israel
- Swedish Defence Research Agency - Sweden
