= Hakka people =

Ethnic group native to southeastern China and Taiwan

Hakka
客家 Hak-kâ 客家人
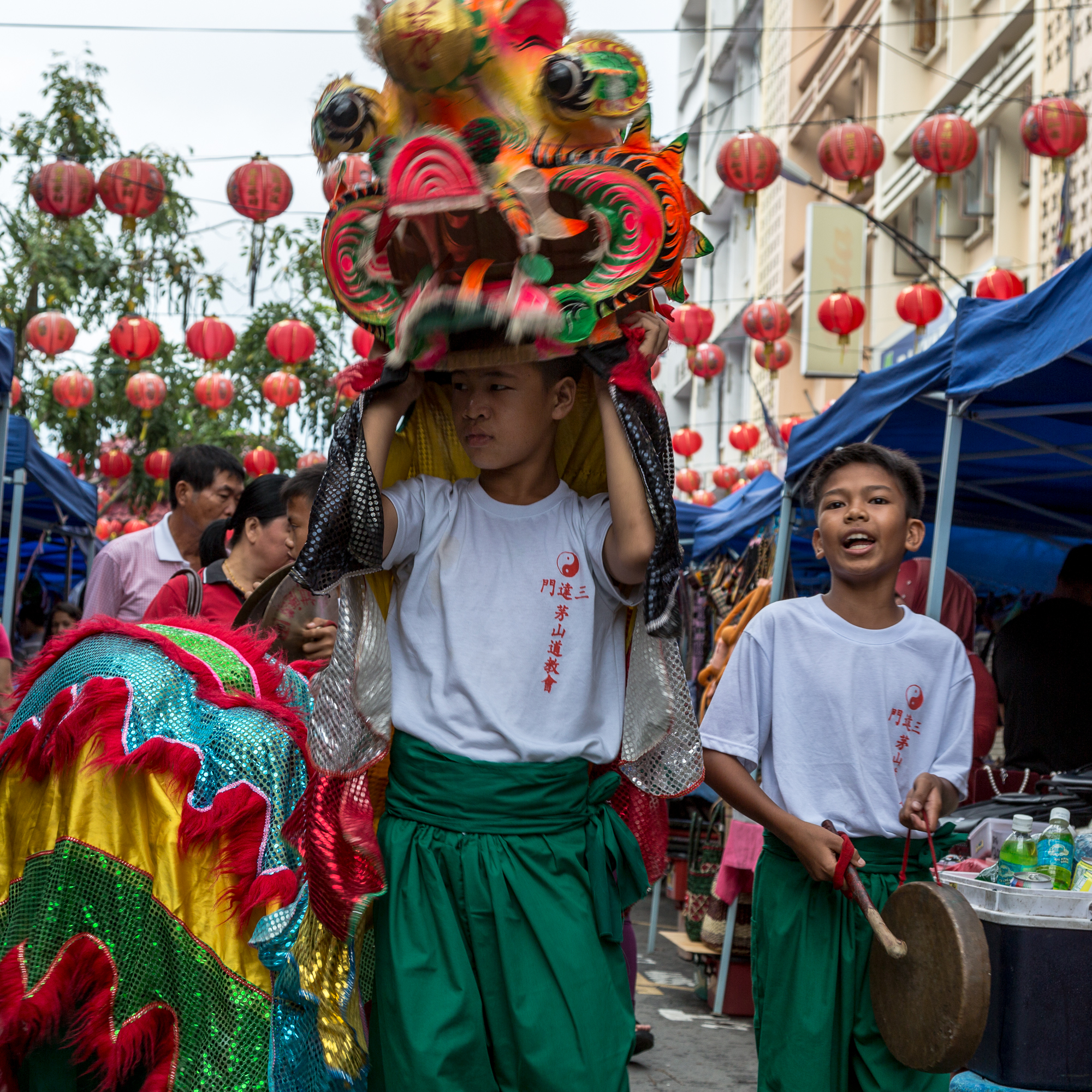
- Hakka dancers performing Qilin dance

Total population
- 80 million

Regions with significant populations
- China, Taiwan, Southeast Asia, Australia, Europe, Americas

Languages
- Hakka; Standard Chinese; English, Hokkien, Cantonese and other languages of their countries of residence

Religion
- Chinese folk religion, Confucianism, Taoism, Mahayana Buddhism, Christianity, Theravada Buddhism, Islam

Related ethnic groups
- Gan, She, Yao

Hakka people

Chinese name
- Chinese: 客家
- Literal meaning: guest families
Transcriptions
Standard Mandarin
- Hanyu Pinyin: Kèjiā
- Bopomofo: ㄎㄜˋ ㄐㄧㄚ
- Wade–Giles: K'o^{4}-chia^{1}
- Tongyong Pinyin: Kè-jia
- IPA: [kʰɤ̂.tɕjá]
Gan
- Romanization: Kak6 Ga1
Hakka
- Romanization: Hag^{2}-ga^{24}
Yue: Cantonese
- Yale Romanization: Haak-gāa
- Jyutping: Haak3 gaa1
- IPA: [hak̚˧ ka˥]
Southern Min
- Tâi-lô: Kheh-ka

Vietnamese name
- Vietnamese: người Khách Gia, người Hẹ

The Hakka (Chinese: 客家), also referred to as the Hakka Chinese or Hakka-speaking Chinese, are a Han Chinese sub-ethnic group whose principal settlements and ancestral homes are dispersed widely across the provinces of southern China and who speak a language that is closely related to Gan, a Chinese language spoken in Jiangxi province. They are differentiated from other southern Han Chinese by their dispersed nature and tendency to occupy marginal lands and remote hilly areas. The Chinese characters for Hakka (客家) literally mean "guest families".

The Hakka have settled throughout China and their presence is especially prominent in the landlocked border regions of Guangdong, Fujian and Jiangxi.

Substantial numbers of Hakka Chinese have migrated overseas to various countries around the world. Primarily, Hakka Chinese migrated to Malaysia, Taiwan, Singapore, Indonesia, and Vietnam. Others went further still to North and South America, the Caribbean, Mauritius, and India. Indeed, many cities around the world like Kolkata and Toronto have significant Hakka populations today, and many of those feature local Hakka organizations.

== Origin and identity ==
=== Migrations ===
Historical Hakka migrations

The Hakka, a group of nomadic peoples originating from the North, arrived in southern China much later than other southern Han Chinese populations. These earlier waves of southern Han Chinese colonists settled fertile lowlands on the coasts and rivers, assimilated many non-Han locals and expelled others like the Tanka, and formed distinctive cultural identities and dialects. Consequently, the Hakka were forced to locate their settlements on marginal territories and relatively infertile land.

Lo Hsiang-lin, a researcher in Hakka language and culture, argued that the Hakka mainly comprise descendants of Central Plains Chinese refugees fleeing social unrest, upheaval, and invasions. However, the Hakka were different in being late arrivals, moving from Central China into Southern China when the earlier groups of Han Chinese settlers in the south had already developed distinctive local identities and languages. Their migration path was also different, and they entered Guangdong, Guangxi and Fujian via Jiangxi province, instead of traversing Hunan or moving along the Fujian coast.

=== Genetic findings ===
Studies show extensive unidirectional gene flow from the Hakka people to surrounding Han Chinese populations in the south resulting in a very close relationship. According to a 2009 study published in the American Journal of Human Genetics, the Hakka people are principally of Han Chinese descent, exhibiting an average genetic difference of 0.32% with other tested Han Chinese persons. Nonetheless, compared with other southern Han Chinese groups, the Hakka genetic profile exhibits a slight skew towards northern Han people.

=== Cultural identity ===
The Hakka identify as Han Chinese and genetic studies show they are principally of Han ancestry, despite a recorded history of intermarriage with minority groups such as the Yao and the She. Furthermore, the Hakka language belongs to the Sinitic group of languages, being linguistically proximate to the Gan dialect of Jiangxi. The Hakka also exhibit traditional Confucian values, such as a respect for family, ancestor veneration, and a commitment to both learning and the ideals of a Confucian gentleman. Finally, they carry Han Chinese surnames and use Han Chinese naming conventions. Lingnan Hakka place names indicate a long history of the Hakka being Han Chinese. Like the Cantonese, they fiercely insisted on their Han identities and were principal movers of the Anti-Qing movement.

However, the Hakka differed in their lifestyles and their preferred mode of habitation - living in large communal fortress-like buildings (known as tulou) instead of residing in courtyard houses (or siheyuan). They also settled in marginal or hardscrabble hill land avoided by other Han Chinese subgroups, and in this regard, were considered similar to non-Han Indigenous peoples. They also exhibited gender egalitarianism to a greater degree than other southern Chinese. In fact, the Hakka Chinese, from southern China, did not bind their feet because their women had more social freedom, sometimes traveled, and needed to work.

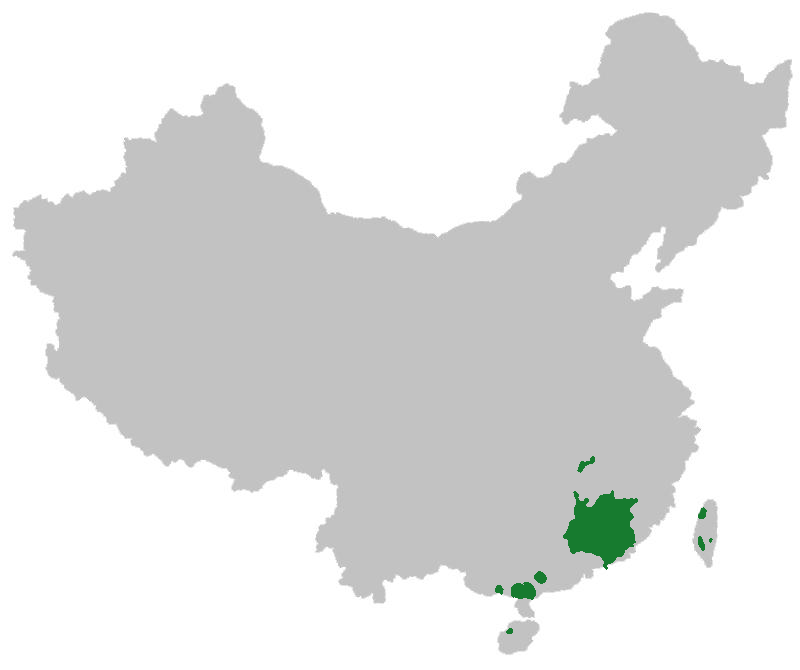
Hakka language distribution in China

Unlike other Han Chinese groups, the Hakka people are not named after a geographical region, e.g. a province, county or city. The Hakka people generally have a distinct identity from the Cantonese people, even though 60% of Hakka people in China reside in Guangdong province, and 95% of overseas Hakka people's ancestral homes are in Guangdong. Hakka people from Chaoshan, Guangzhou, and Fujian may identify only as Chaoshanese, Cantonese, and Hokkien.

=== Distant origins ===
It is commonly held that the Hakka people are a subgroup of Han Chinese that originated in the central plains. To trace their origins, a number of theories so far have been brought forth among anthropologists, linguists and historians:

1. the Hakka people are Han Chinese originating solely from the Central Plain;
2. the Hakka people are northern Han Chinese from the Central Plain with some inflow of Han Chinese from the south;
3. the Hakka people are southern Han Chinese with some inflow of northern Han Chinese from the Central Plain.

The theories indicating a descent from both northern and southern Han are the most likely and are together supported by multiple scientific studies into the genetics. Furthermore, research into the mitochondrial DNA of the Hakka indicates that the majority of their matrilineal gene pool consists of lineages prevalent in the southern Han. Clyde Kiang stated that the Hakka people's origins may also be linked with ancient neighbors of the Han, the Dongyi and Xiongnu people. However, this is disputed by many scholars and Kiang's theories are considered to be false.

Hakka Chinese scientist and researcher Dr. Siu-Leung Lee stated in the book by Chung Yoon-Ngan, The Hakka Chinese: Their Origin, Folk Songs And Nursery Rhymes, that the potential Hakka origins from the Northern Han and Xiongnu and that of the indigenous Southern She and Yue tribes, "are all correct, yet none alone explain the origin of the Hakka", pointing out that the problem with DNA profiling on limited numbers of people within population pools cannot correctly ascertain who is really the Southern Chinese, because many Southern Chinese are also from Northern Asia; Hakka or non-Hakka. It is known that the earliest major waves of Hakka migration began due to the attacks of the two aforementioned tribes during the Jin dynasty (266–420).

=== Definitional problems and disambiguation ===
The study of this population group is complicated by linguistic uncertainty and nomenclatural ambiguity in the historical record. The term Hakka (客家) is sometimes broadly used to refer to other southern Han Chinese groups during their southward migration. Imperial census statistics did not distinguish what varieties of Chinese the population spoke. Some family genealogies also employ the term Hakka (客家) to refer to their southward migration, even though they belonged to the earlier groups of Han Chinese settlers and did not speak a Gan-affiliated language. These clans would be properly regarded as belonging to local dialect groups due to the timing of their arrival, the language they spoke, the customs they practiced, and the route of their traversal. These families were not part of the groups of settlers today associated with the Hakka, who arrived in southern China at a much later date through Jiangxi province and who spoke a Gan-affiliated language.

For example, the study by Lo Hsiang-lin, K'o-chia Yen-chiu Tao-Liu / An Introduction to the Study of the Hakka people (Hsin-Ning & Singapore, 1933) used genealogical sources of family clans from various southern counties, leading to the inclusion of native southern Han Chinese families into the Hakka category.

== Language ==
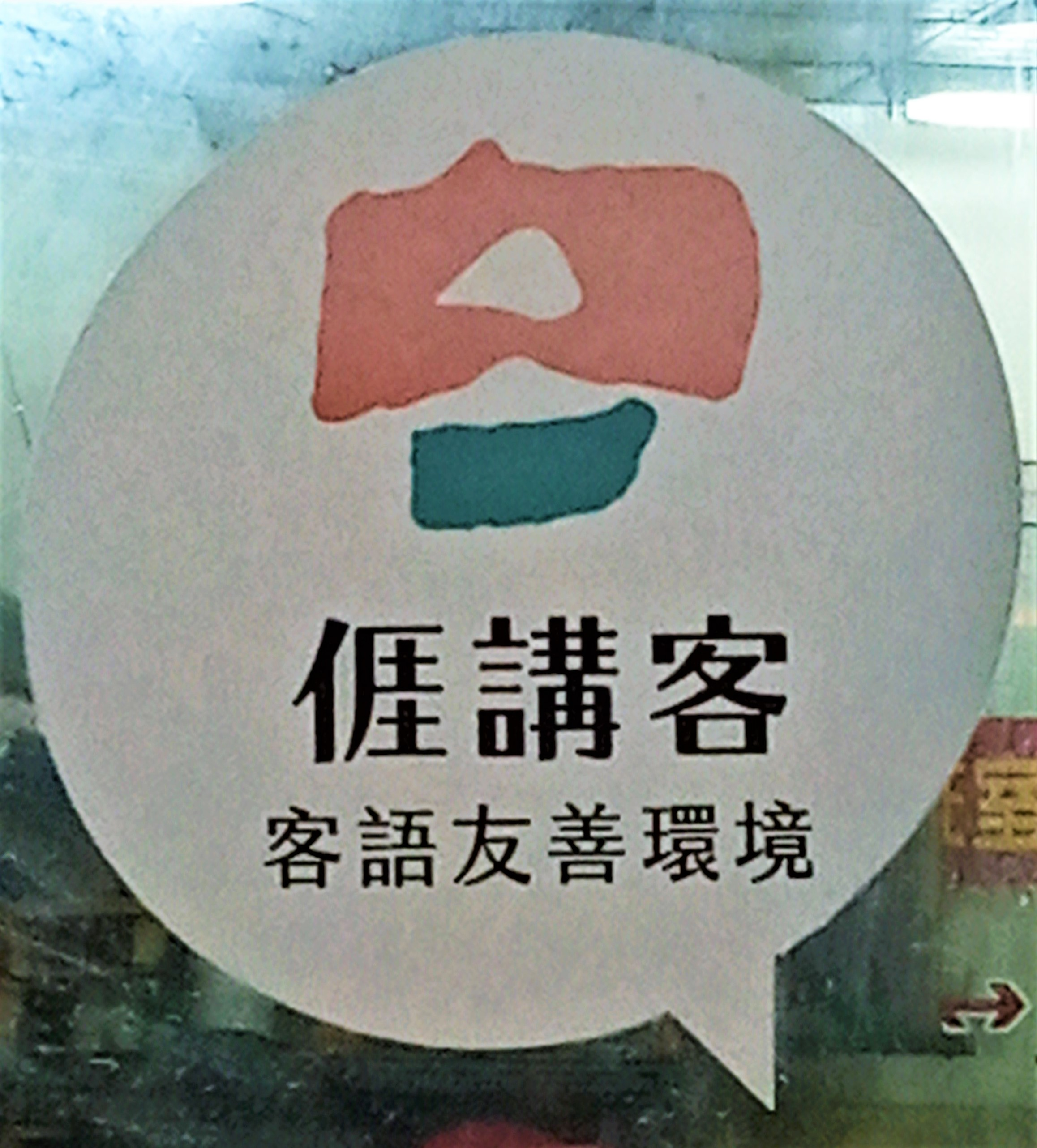
Hakka Chinese sign

Hakka Chinese is the native Chinese variety of the Hakka people. Hakka Chinese is the closest Chinese variety to Gan Chinese in terms of phonetics, with academics considering the late Old Gan together with Hakka Chinese and the Tongtai dialect of Jianghuai Mandarin to have been the lingua franca of the Southern dynasties. Northern Hakka varieties have partial mutual intelligibility with southern Gan. Accordingly, Hakka is sometimes classified as a variety of Gan. Some studies posit that Hakka people and Gan people have close genetic relations and shared areal features.

In Taiwan, the Ministry of Education named "Taiwanese Hakka" as one of the languages of Taiwan.

== Culture ==
Hakka culture has been largely shaped by the new environment, which they had to alter many aspects of their culture to adapt, which helped influence their architecture and cuisine. When the Hakka were forcibly displaced due to agricultural land theft, or expanded according to some into areas with pre-existing populations in the South, there was often little agricultural land left for them to farm. Multiple displacements forced the once nomadic people to increasingly thrive on the agricultural lands with poor soil, slopes, and erosion. As a result, many Hakka men turned towards careers in the military or in public service.

=== Architecture ===
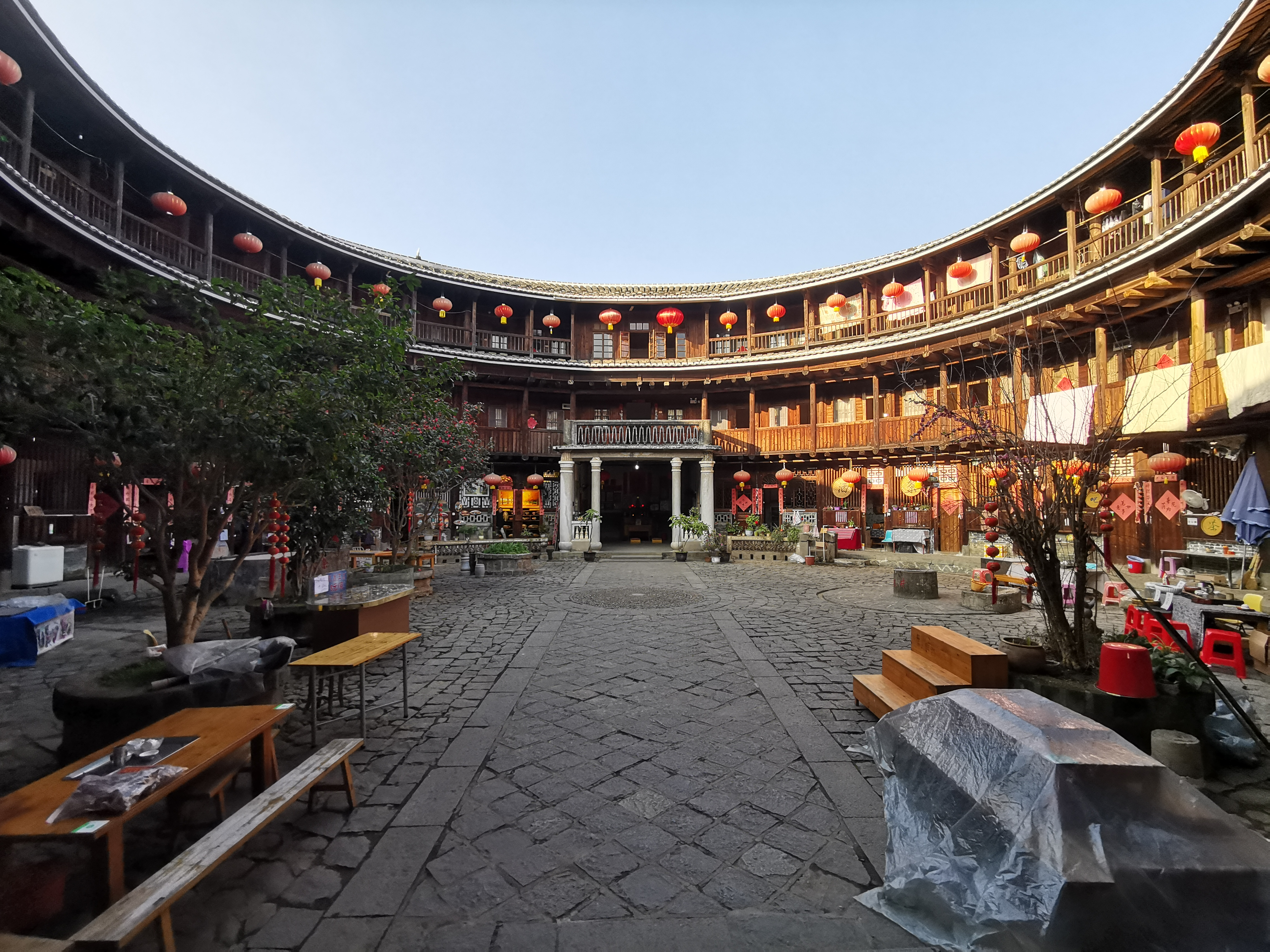
Tianluokeng Tulou cluster in Hukeng, Fujian

Hakka people built several types of tulou and peasant fortified villages in the mountainous rural parts of far western Fujian and adjacent southern Jiangxi and northern Guangdong regions. A representative sample of Fujian tulou (consisting of 10 buildings or building groups) in Fujian was inscribed in 2008 as a UNESCO World Heritage Site.

Another very popular architectural style in northern east Guangdong, such as Xingning and Meixian, is Wrapped Dragon Village (Chinese: 圍龍屋; pinyin: wéilóngwū).

=== Cuisine ===
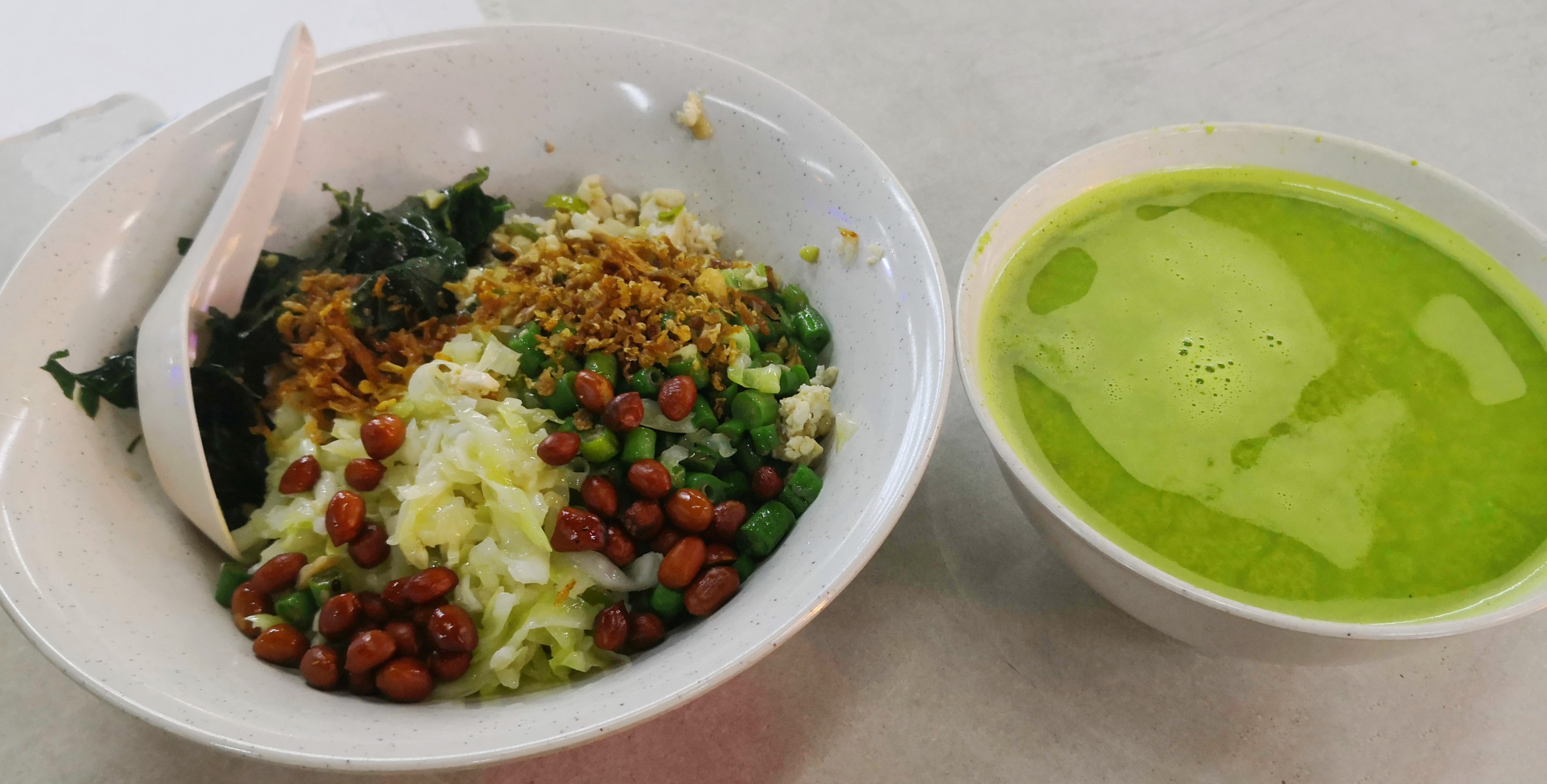
Lei cha, a Hakka tea-based soup made with green tea, basil, coriander and mugwort

Hakka cuisine is known for the use of preserved meats and tofu, as well as stewed and braised dishes. Some of the popular dishes are Yong Tau Foo and Lei Cha. These dishes are popular in Taiwan, Malaysia, Indonesia, Thailand, and Singapore. The taste profile is generally light, tending even towards blandness, with a preference for allowing the taste of the ingredients, especially the herbs, to emerge through any seasoning.

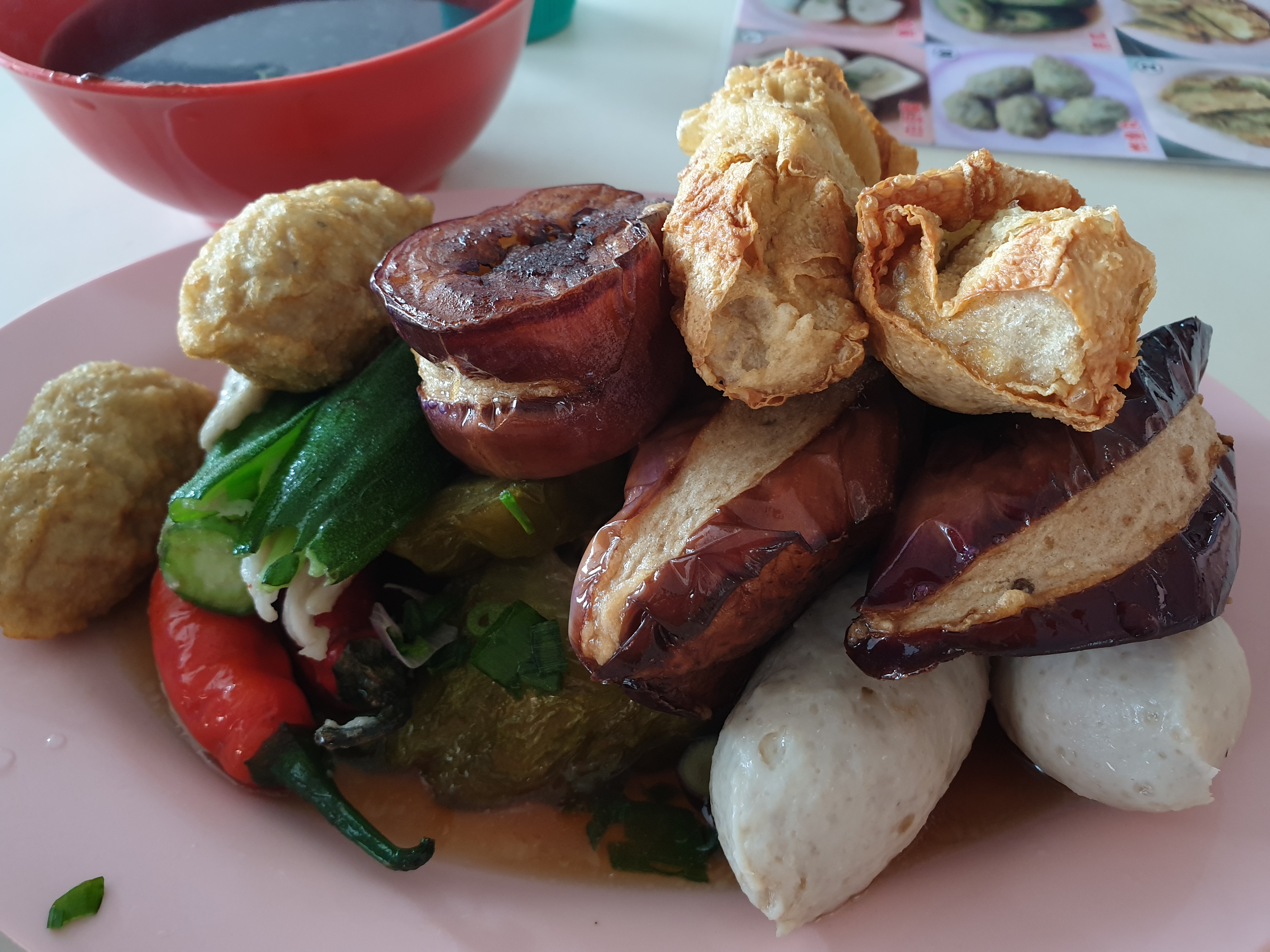
Yong tau foo in Malaysia, brought over by Hakka immigrants

Lei cha is a traditional Southern Chinese tea-based beverage or rice gruel that forms a part of Hakka cuisine. Ingredients include green tea, basil, sawtooth coriander, mugwort, and a kind of herb known as "Fu Yip Sum". It is generally regarded as laborious and difficult to make. Usually eaten with side dishes.

haYong tau foo is a Hakka Chinese food consisting primarily of tofu that has been filled with either a ground meat mixture or fish paste. It can be eaten dry with sauce or served in a soup base.

Suanpanzi is another popular Hakka dish which literally means "abacus seeds". It consists of mainly yam or tapioca beaten into the shape of abacus beads. The dish is served with minced pork or chicken and with light seasoning.

=== Music ===
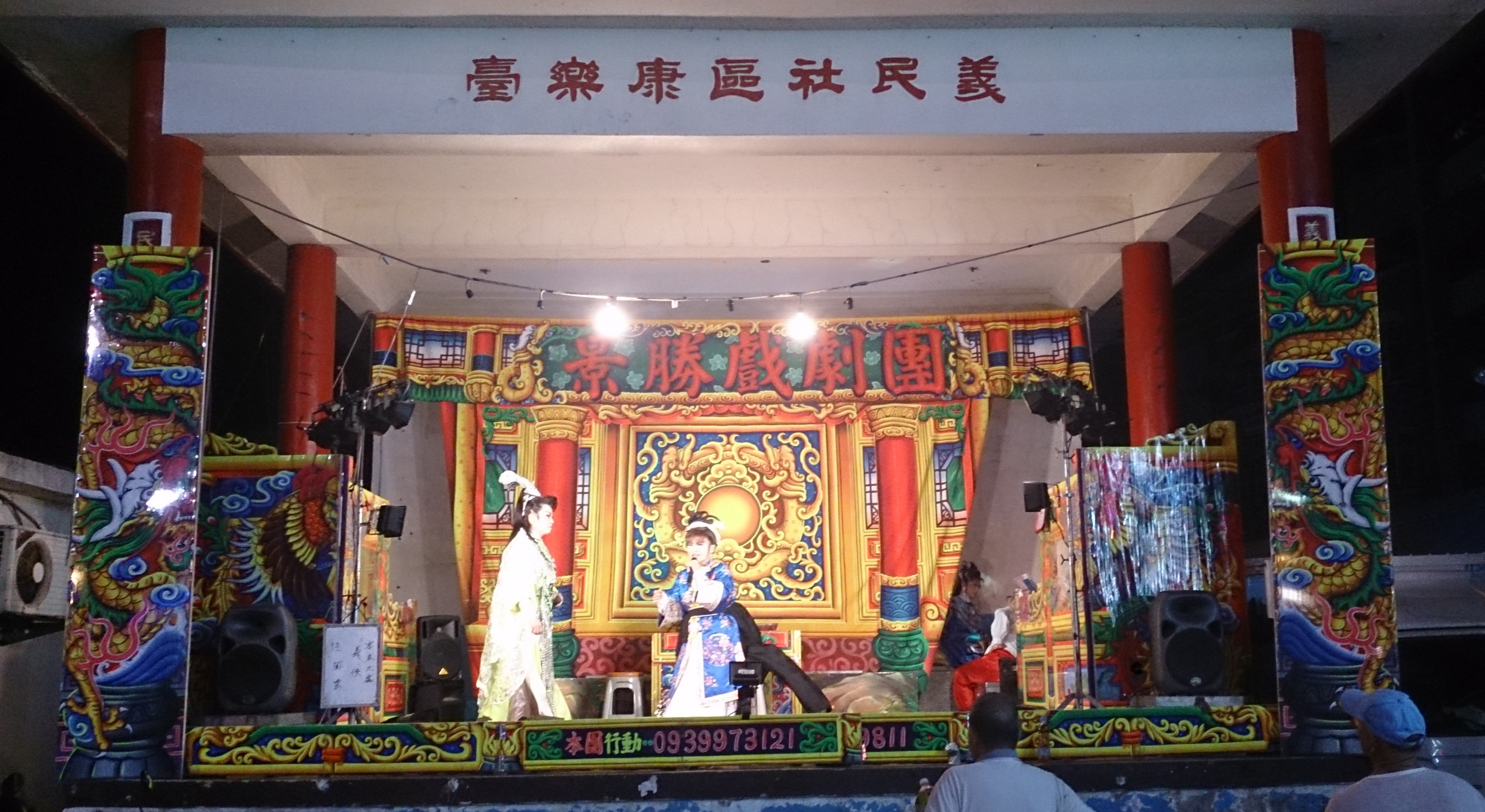
Taiwanese Hakka opera at the Ghost Festival

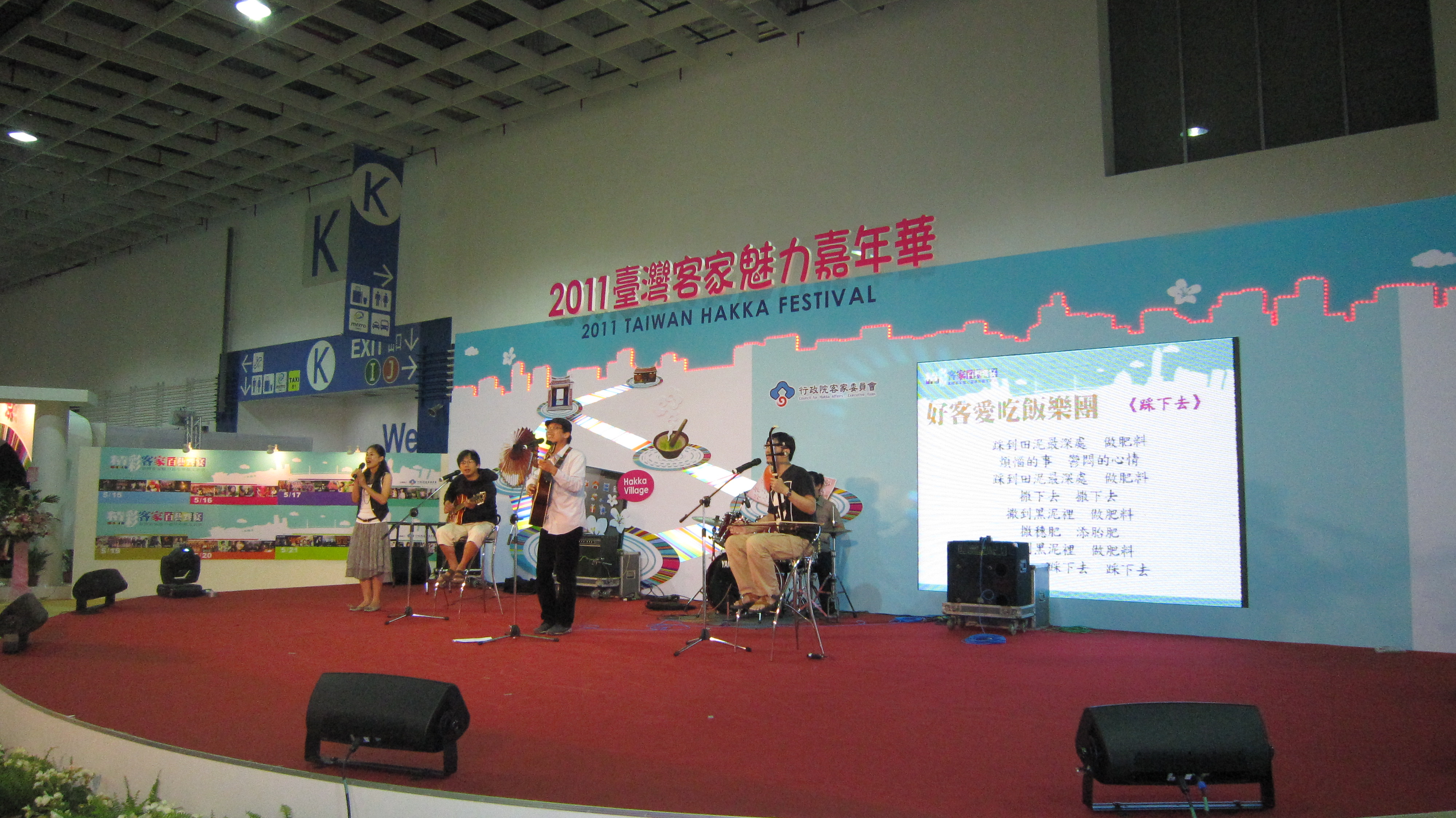
Hakkapop festival

==== Hill song ====
Hakka hill songs are traditionally used by hillside farmers in parts of Taiwan and China, mainly for entertainment in the farming fields and courting practices. They are characterized by the strong, resonating melody and voice, which echo around hills and can be heard for up to a mile around the area. Hill songs can be considered a form of communication, as their participants often use them to communicate love songs or news.

==== Hakkapop ====
Hakkapop is a genre of Hakka pop music made primarily in China, Taiwan, Malaysia and Indonesia.

==== Hakka Eight Sounds ====
Hakka Eight Sounds is an instrument ensemble that commonly performs at communal events. The name Eight Sounds comes from the eight materials used to construct instruments outlined in the Zhou Rites, an ancient Chinese classification system. The materials include “metal, stone, earth, leather, silk, wood, gourd, and bamboo”. Such a name reflects the ensemble's historical connection to traditional Chinese musical culture.

In Taiwanese Eight Sounds, the ensembles tend to contain a combination of various traditional Chinese musical instruments. These Chinese musical instruments can be generally divided into three main groups: wind, string, and percussion instruments. The specific combination of instruments varies depending on both the region of where it is being played as well as the group that is in charge of playing it. The wind instruments commonly include the suona, a double reed wind instrument that leads the ensemble and plays the main melody. Other wind instruments include the xiao (簫), a vertical bamboo flute, and the guan (管), a double-reed wind instrument. While the suona creates loud piercing sounds, the other wind instruments contribute softer tones. The string instruments include the erhu (二胡), panghu (梆胡), and erxian (二線). They work to produce warm and expressive bright tones that complement the melody. The percussion instruments usually includes the drums and the cymbals. The gongs make loud crashes, while the drums produce deep booming beats. Together, they provide the rhythmic foundation for the ensemble. Overall, the three instrument groups work together to create the distinctive sound of Hakka Bayin. While the suona tends to create the main melody, the percussion establish the rhytmic foundation, and the string and bamboo wind instruments provide additional melodic phrases that help enrich the overall musical arrangement.

Regional variation developed as the tradition spread across Taiwan. Southern Hakka Eight Sounds retained a more distinct Hakka style, while northern ensembles incorporated Beiguan (北管) tunes into the wind repertoire and Beiguan opera melodies into the string ensemble. This was partly practical: the Eight Sounds repertoire was limited, and temple fairs required bands to play Beiguan pieces, including the opening ''banxian'' music, so learning both widened an ensemble's repertoire and work opportunities.It was also musically feasible because the suona techniques involved were similar

Taiwanese Eight Sounds ensembles typically perform at Hakka weddings, religious and temple rituals, and at funerals. Prior to the 1970s, Eight Sounds ensembles played for joyous occasions. However, westernization and new technology caused a significant decline in Eight Sounds performances. In an attempt to survive, the ensembles began playing at funerals. Government policy contributed as well: the 1952 Custom Improvement Movement limited temples to one festival per month and theatrical performances to two days per occasion, and encouraged modest weddings and funerals, reducing the occasions that called for live music. Overall, Eight Sounds is still in decline and its performer base is aging and shrinking.

Despite these trends, there have been some cases where Westernization and modernization increased Hakka Eight Sounds performances. One example is the Kaohsiung Meinong District's protest of a Taiwanese government policy to construct a reservoir dam in the 1990s. In this case, young emigrants returned to Meinong to help locals protest by combining Meinong Hakka mountain songs with Hakka Eight Sounds to clash with rock - a nod to the discrepancy between Meinong's past rural role as a tobacco producer versus the government's intentions for it to become an industrialization center. These new developments did not stop in the 21st century. As Meinong children began to come of age in the 2010s, they wanted to continue advocating for the Meinong community, but did not have the cultural knowledge to do so. To curb this deficit, several local elementary schools created opportunities for their students to sing songs and record albums about Meinong culture, often using music from other genres. The combination of Meinong instrumentation with music from outside cultures while singing in Hakka allows for cultural exchange within the Meinong community and increased opportunities for performances in the future.

In 2010, the Ministry of Culture designated the Chen Family Beiguan Bayin Group as a preservation group, with training programmes running through 2018 and subsidies for larger ensembles. As a result, support for the tradition has shifted partly from paid community performances to public funding, and some performances are now cultural demonstrations rather than part of everyday ritual.

Historically, Hakka women did not bind their feet when the practice was commonplace in other parts of China. Hakka women are known for their independent nature and willingness to engage in hard work typically reserved for men in other dialect groups.

This may have been driven by historical necessity rather than cultural differences, since the Hakka employed marginal hill lands which were less fertile than the river valleys occupied by other Han subgroups, such as the Cantonese, the Teochew, and the Hoklo.

=== Media ===
In 1950, China’s Central People's Broadcasting Station recruited its first Hakka broadcaster, Zhang Guohua, based on a radius of two kilometers from the Meixian government. On April 10, 1950, the Voice of Hakka (客家之聲) started broadcasting. It broadcast nine hours of Hakka Chinese programs every day through shortwave radio and online radio, targeting countries and regions where Hakka people gather, such as Japan, Indonesia, Mauritius, Reunion Island, Australia, Hong Kong and Taiwan.

In 1988, Meizhou Television Station (梅州電視臺) was founded. In 1994, Hakka Public Channel, also known as Meizhou TV-2 started broadcasting. Hakka Chinese began to appear in television programs. In 2021, it was renamed Hakka Life Channel (客家生活頻道).

In 1991, Meizhou People's Broadcasting Station (梅州人民廣播電臺), also known as Meizhou Wired Broadcasting Station (梅州有線廣播電臺) officially started broadcasting. Meizhou Radio News: FM94.8 or urban FM101.9. Meizhou Radio Traffic Channel: FM105.8 MHz. Meizhou Radio Private Car Channel: FM94.0 or urban FM103.9. Hakka Chinese continues to be used in news, radio dramas, talk shows, entertainment, and cultural programs.

In 1999, 3CW Chinese Radio Australia (3CW澳大利亞中文廣播電臺) was launched. It used Mandarin, Cantonese and Hakka.

In 2001, Meizhou Television Station merged with Meizhou People's Broadcasting Station and was renamed Meizhou Radio and Television Station (MRT, 梅州廣播電視臺). In 2004, the station had officially completed its establishment.

In 2003, Taiwan Broadcasting System (TBS, 臺灣公共廣播電視集團) established a Hakka satellite cable channel "Hakka TV". In Taiwan, there are seven Hakka Chinese radio channels.

In 2005, Meixian Radio and Television Station (梅縣廣播電視臺) was reorganized after the separation of the National Cultural System Reform Bureau. It is a public institution under the jurisdiction of the Meixian County Party Committee and County Government. The channel can be watched in Meizhou and the surrounding area with an audience of over 4 million people.

In 2012, Voice of Hong Kong (香港之聲) started broadcasting. Hakka Chinese is used on Sihai Kejia Channel.

In 2019, Shenzhou Easy Radio (神州之聲) added a Hakka Chinese radio break which broadcasts to the southeast coast of mainland China, Taiwan, Southeast Asia, the South Pacific and Japan. On Radio The Greater Bay (大灣區之聲), Sihai Kejia Channel has also joined.

In 2023, The Xuexi Qiangguo (學習強國) Platform under the supervision of the Publicity Department of the Chinese Communist Party added automatic broadcasting in Hakka Chinese.

== Religion ==
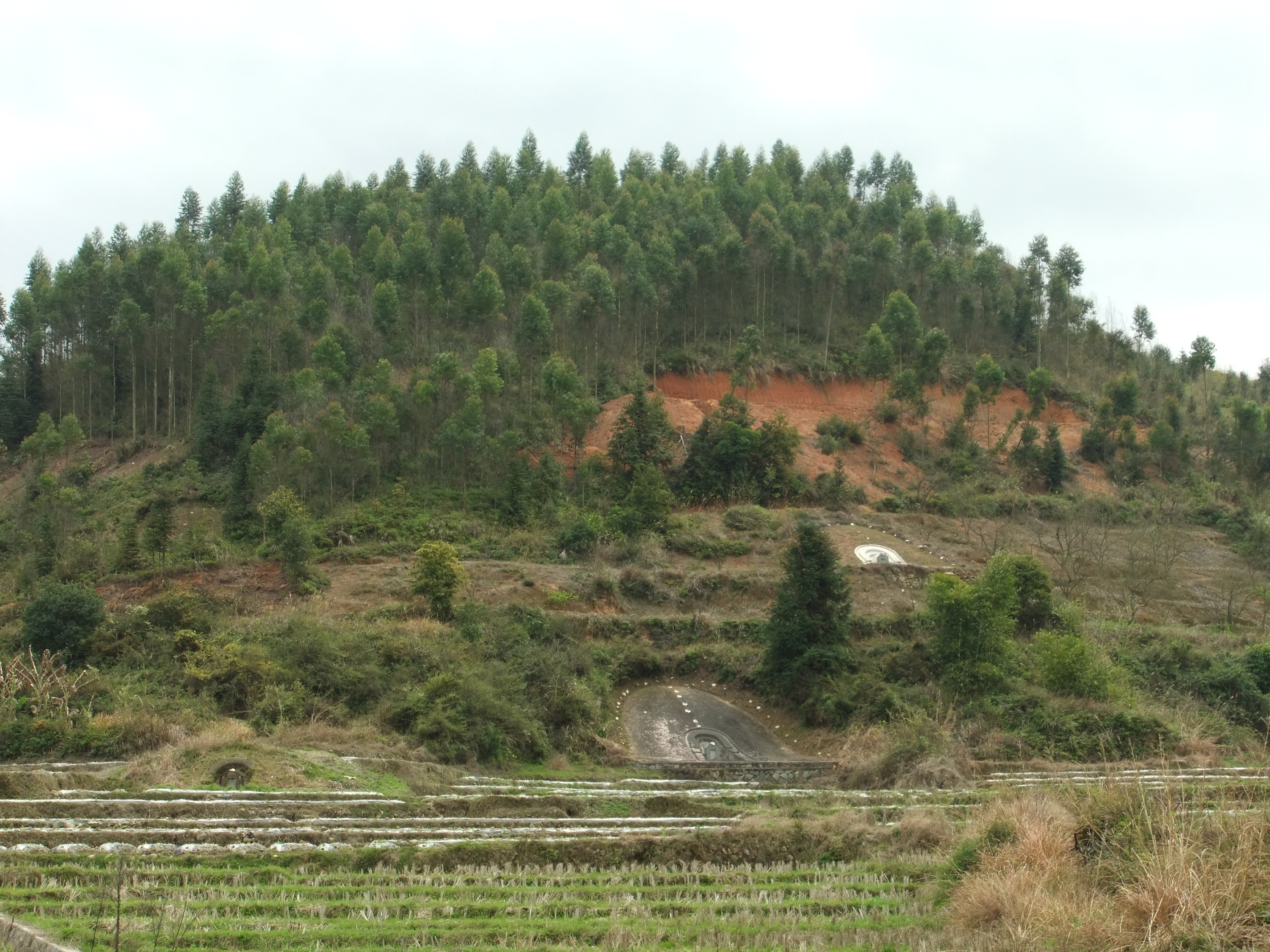
Typical traditional hillside tombs IJ Hukeng, Fujian

The religious practices of Hakka people are largely similar to those of other Han Chinese. Ancestor veneration is the primary form of religious expression. One distinctively Hakka religious practice involves the worship of dragon deities.

== Discrimination ==
=== Imperial era - Qing dynasty ===
People of Hakka ancestry comprised the notable mainstay of the Taiping Heavenly Kingdom, although other dialect groups also enlisted. The leader of the Xiang Army, Zeng Guofan, had a special contempt for Hakka women, referring to them as "hillbilly witches".

In retaliation for killing three Hunanese officers, the Xiang Army exterminated the entire Hakka population of Wukeng and Chixi during military counter-attacks on the Hakka people in the year 1888. The army also massacred tens of thousands of other Hakka people in Guanghai, a region of Taishan, Guangdong. Many of the killings in Guanghai took place in the Dalongdong area.

The Taiping rebellion caused millions of casualties on both sides. In retaliation, after defeating the Taiping Heavenly Kingdom, the Xiang Army targeted Hakka villages and is estimated to have killed ~30,000 Hakka people every day during the height of the retaliation.

=== Discrimination against Hakka by the Cantonese ===
Cantonese people have had a history of friction with Hakka, despite both of them being Han subgroups speaking varieties of Chinese, one from Middle Chinese, the other from Old Chinese (but with a few mutually intelligible words). Some Cantonese have regarded the Hakka as displaying non-Han habits and as opportunists intruding on Cantonese territory.

==== Mass killings of Hakka people in China ====
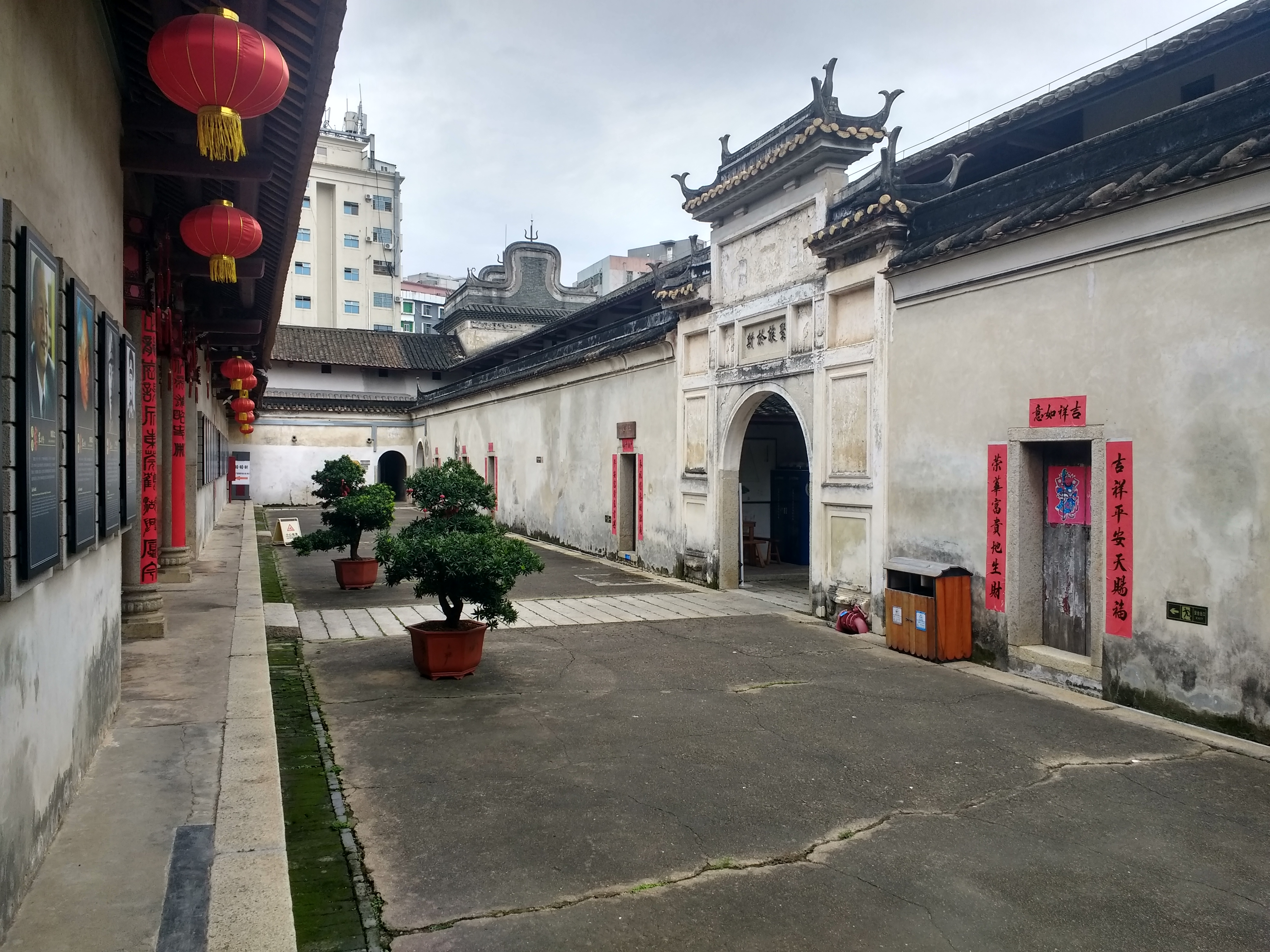
Hehu New Residence in the Longgang Museum of Hakka Culture in Shenzhen, Guangdong

The Red Turban rebels, who were mostly of Cantonese ancestry, carried out a genocidal campaign against the Hakka people during a revolt (1854–1856) against the Qing dynasty. The Cantonese Red Turbans killed 13 Hakka village chiefs and 7,630 other Hakka people while on their way to Heshan, and after conquering it, they killed another 1,320 Hakka people.

The bloody Punti–Hakka Clan Wars involved reciprocal massacres by both groups, but the Hakka bore the brunt of the casualties. This war eventually killed some 500,000 Hakka people (or quite possibly even more). During these killings, the Cantonese generally collaborated with the Xiang people, since both dialect groups had an axe to grind against the Hakka.

In retaliation for a Hakka massacre of Cantonese people, Cantonese peasants butchered 500 Hakka people in a village located in the rural Enping county forcing the surviving Hakka people to flee, but these refugees, who numbered some 4,000 Hakka, were later all caught and killed by Cantonese peasants, who spared neither women nor child. Government officials mobilized officers and men from the local Cantonese peasants to regain the Guanghai area which was occupied by the Hakka people. The number of Hakka people killed was tens of thousands in the Dalongdong area of Guanghai alone.

==== Discrimination and hatred of Hakka outside Guangdong ====
The Cantonese murdered more than 70 Hakka fellow provincials in Shanghai under the justification of a Hakka conspiracy that the Jiaying group was surrendering the city to foreign control. On 27 August 1925, villages in a county belonging to the Hakka minority were attacked; Chiang's Punti (Cantonese) men and soldiers did not hesitate to rape their women and pillage their homes.

Inter-ethnic hatred between the two groups also rose to a boil in Malaysia. Memories of conflict and old grudges sparked another round of conflict between the Hakka people and Cantonese in Perak, Malaya, leading to the Larut Wars.

Upon arriving in Madagascar, the Cantonese colluded to prevent any Hakka migration to Madagascar.

==== By Guangxi people ====
More than 100,000 Hakka people were slaughtered by the locals in Guangxi province during another clan war. In October 1850, the Cantonese and Hakka people were hacking and killing each other for over 40 days in Guigang.

=== Attacks against Hakka by the Lingao people ===
Between 1925 and 1926, thousands were killed and wounded when the ethnic hatred of the Hakka people by the natives of Lingao turned violent in northwestern Hainan.

== Geographic distribution ==
=== Hakka in mainland China ===
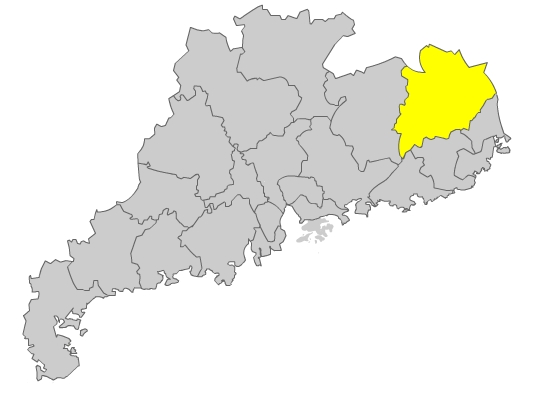
Meizhou Prefecture (in yellow) in Guangdong province, where Xingning and Meixian are located

Hakka populations are found in 13 out of the 27 provinces and autonomous regions of mainland China.

==== Guangdong ====
Hakka people who live in Guangdong comprise about 60% of the total Hakka population. Worldwide, over 95% of the overseas-descended Hakka people came from this Guangdong region, usually from Meizhou and Heyuan as well as other towns such as Shenzhen, Jieyang, Dongguan and Huizhou. Hakka people live mostly in the northeast part of the province, particularly in the so-called Xing-Mei (Xingning–Meixian) area. Unlike their kin in Fujian, Hakka in the Xingning and Meixian area developed a non-fortress-like unique architectural style, most notably the weilongwu (圍龍屋; wéilóngwū or Hakka: Wui Lung Wuk) and sijiaolou (四角樓; sìjǐaolóu or Hakka: Si Kok Liu).

==== Fujian ====
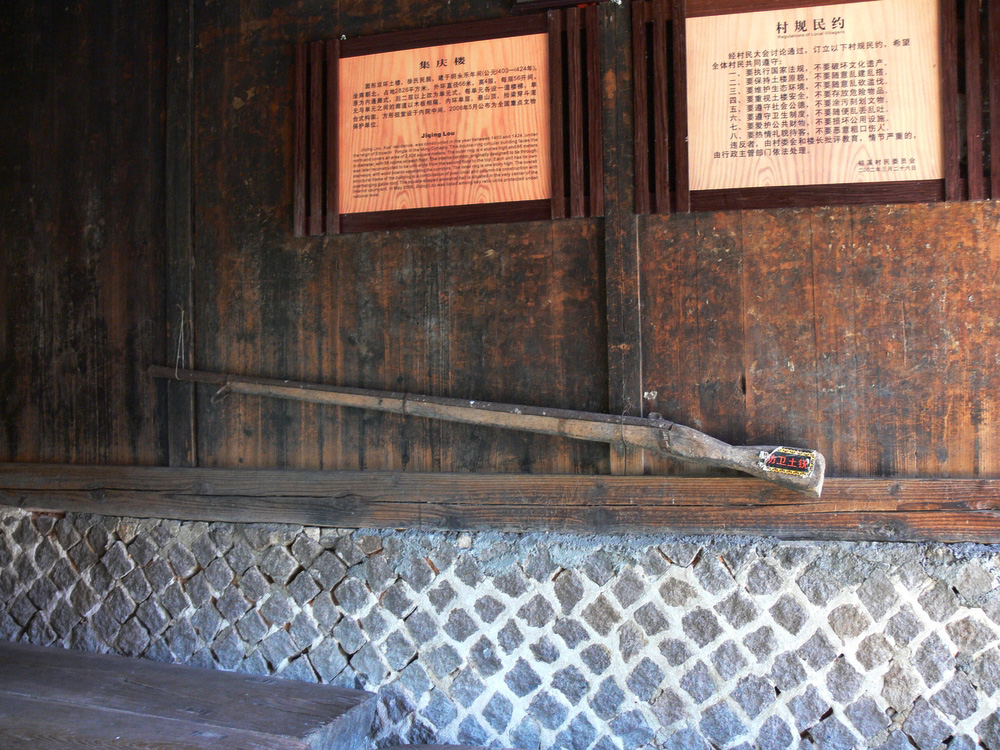
A musket in a Hakka Fujian tulou

Tradition states that the early Hakka ancestors traveling from north China entered Fujian first, then by way of the Ting River they traveled to Guangdong and other parts of China, as well as overseas. Thus, the Ting River is also regarded as the Hakka Mother River.

The Hakka people who settled in the mountainous region of south-western Fujian province developed a unique form of architecture known as the tulou (土樓), literally meaning earthen structures. The tulou are round or square and were designed as a combined large fortress and multi-apartment building complex. The structures typically had only one entrance-way, with no windows at ground level. Each floor served a different function: the first floor contained a well and livestock, the second food storage, and the third and higher floors living spaces. Tulou were built to withstand attack from bandits and marauders.

Today, Western Fujian is inhabited by 3 million Hakka people, scattered around villages in 10 counties (county-level 'cities' and districts) in Longyan and Sanming prefectures, 98% of whom are Hakka people living in Changting, Liancheng, Shanghang, Wuping, Yongding, Ninghua, Qingliu and Mingxi counties.

==== Jiangxi ====
Jiangxi contains the second largest Hakka community. Nearly all of southern Jiangxi province is Hakka to this day, especially in Ganzhou. In the Song dynasty, a large number of Han Chinese migrated to the delta area as the Court moved southward due to invasions by northern minorities. They lived in Jiangxi and intermixed with the She and Yao minorities. Ganzhou was the place that the Hakka had settled before migrating to western Fujian and eastern Guangdong. During the early Qing dynasty, there was a massive depopulation in southern Jiangxi due to pestilence and war. However, western Fujian and eastern Guangdong suffered a population explosion at the same time. Some edicts were issued to block the coastal areas, ordering coastal residents to move to the inland. The population pressure and the sharp contradiction of the land redistribution drove some residents to leave. Some of them moved back to southern Jiangxi, integrating with other Hakka people who had already lived there for generations. Thus, the modern Jiangxi Hakka community was finally formed.

==== Sichuan ====
The Kangxi Emperor (r. 1662–1722), after a tour of the land, decided the province of Sichuan had to be repopulated after the devastation caused by Zhang Xianzhong. Seeing the Hakka living in poverty in the coastal regions in Guangdong province, the emperor encouraged the Hakka people in the south to migrate to Sichuan province. He offered financial assistance to those willing to resettle in Sichuan: eight ounces of silver per man and four ounces per woman or child.

Sichuan was originally the home of the Deng lineage. One member was hired as an official in Guangdong during the Ming dynasty. However, during the Qing plan to increase Sichuan's population in 1671, members of the lineage returned to Sichuan. Deng Xiaoping was born in Sichuan.

==== Hunan ====
Hakka people are mainly concentrated in villages in the counties of Liuyang and Liling.

==== Henan ====
As with those in Sichuan, many Hakka emigrated to Xinyang Prefecture (now southern Henan province), where Li Zicheng carried out a massacre in Guangzhou (now Huangchuan) on 17 January 1636.

=== Hakka in Hong Kong ===
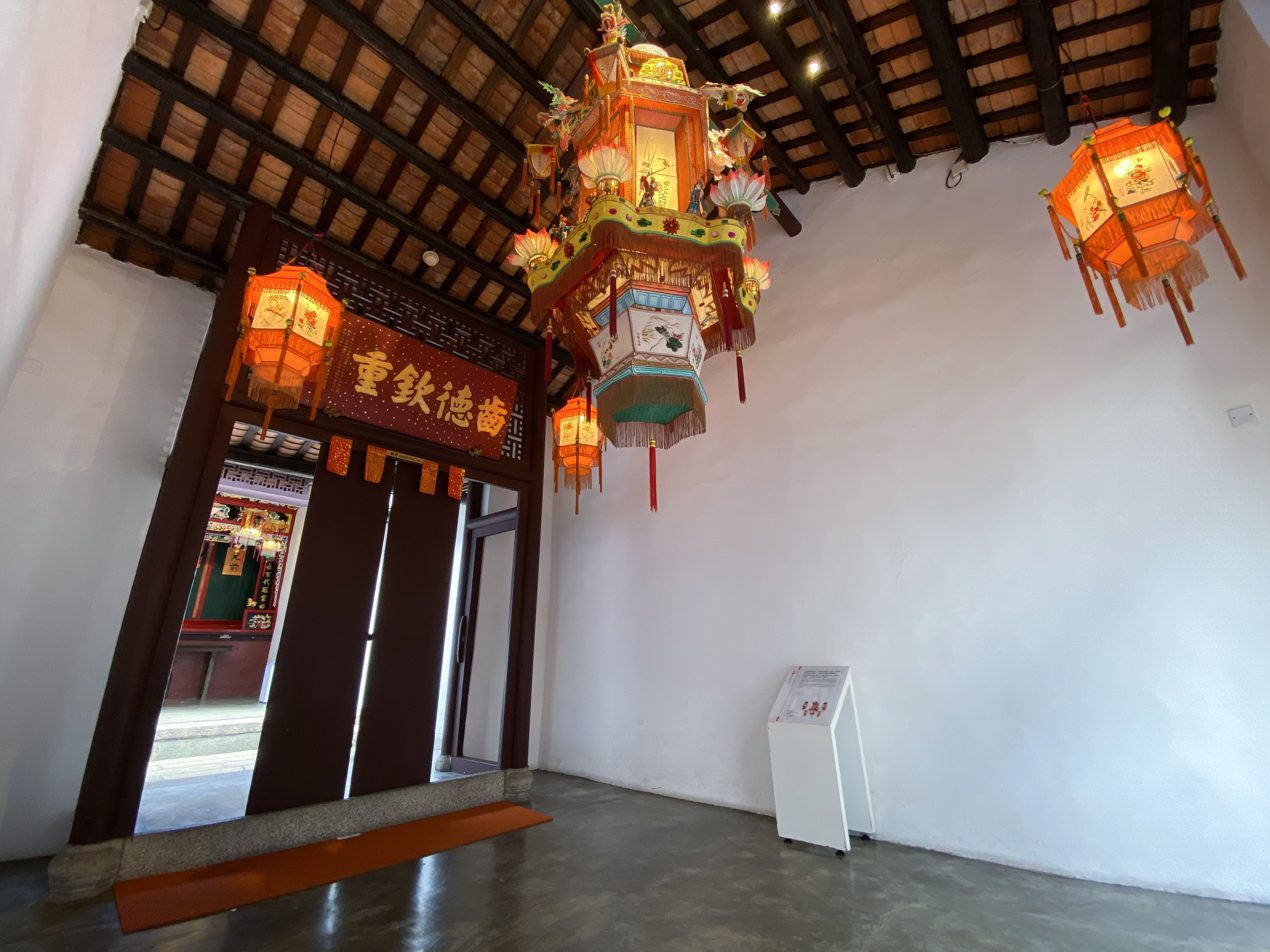
Sam Tung Uk Museum

During the 15th century to 19th century, Hong Kong was in the imperial district of Xin'an (now Shenzhen) County. The 1819 gazetteer lists 570 Punti and 270 Hakka contemporary settlements in the whole district. However, the area covered by Xin'an county is greater than what was to become the British imperial enclave of Hong Kong by 1898. Although there had been settlers originating from the mainland proper even before the Tang dynasty, historical records of those people are non-extant. Only evidence of settlement from archaeological sources can be found. The New Territories lowland areas had been settled originally by several clan lineages in Kam Tin, Sheung Shui, Fanling, Yuen Long, Lin Ma Hang and Tai Po and hence were termed the Punti before the arrival of the Hakka, and fishing families of the Tanka and Hoklo groups to the area. Since the prime farming land had already been farmed, the Hakka land dwellers settled in the less accessible and more hilly areas. Hakka settlements can be found widely distributed around the Punti areas, but in smaller communities. Many are found on coastal areas in inlets and bays surrounded by hills.

Hakka-speaking communities are thought to have arrived in the Hong Kong area after the rescinding of the coastal evacuation order in 1688, such as the Hakka speaking Lee clan lineage of Wo Hang, one of whose ancestors is recorded as arriving in the area in 1688.

As the strong Punti lineages dominated most of the north western New Territories, Hakka communities began to organise local alliances of lineage communities such as the Sha Tau Kok Alliance of Ten or Shap Yeuk as Patrick Hase writes. Hakka villages from Wo Hang to the west and Yantian to the east of Sha Tau Kok came to use it as a local market town and it became the center of Hakka dominance. Further, the Shap Yeuk's land reclamation project transforming marshland to arable farmland with the creation of dykes and levees to prevent storm flooding during the early 19th century shows an example of how local cooperation and the growing affluence of the landed lineages in the Alliance of Ten provided the strong cultural, socioeconomic Hakka influence on the area.

Farming and cultivation have been the traditional occupations of Hakka families from imperial times up until the 1970s. Farming was mostly done by Hakka women while their menfolk sought labouring jobs in the towns and cities. Many men entered indentured labour abroad as was common from the end of the 19th century to the Second World War. Post-war, men took the opportunity to seek work in Britain and other countries, later sending for their families to join them once they sent enough money back to cover travel costs.

As post-war education became available to all children in Hong Kong, a new educated class of Hakka became more mobile in their careers. Many moved to the government-planned new towns which sprung up from the 1960s. The rural Hakka population began to decline as people moved abroad, and away to work in the urban areas. By the end of the 1970s, agriculture was firmly in decline in Hakka villages. Today, there are still Hakka villages around Hong Kong, but being remote, many of their inhabitants have moved to the post-war new towns like Sheung Shui, Tai Po, Sha Tin and further afield.

=== Hakka in Taiwan ===
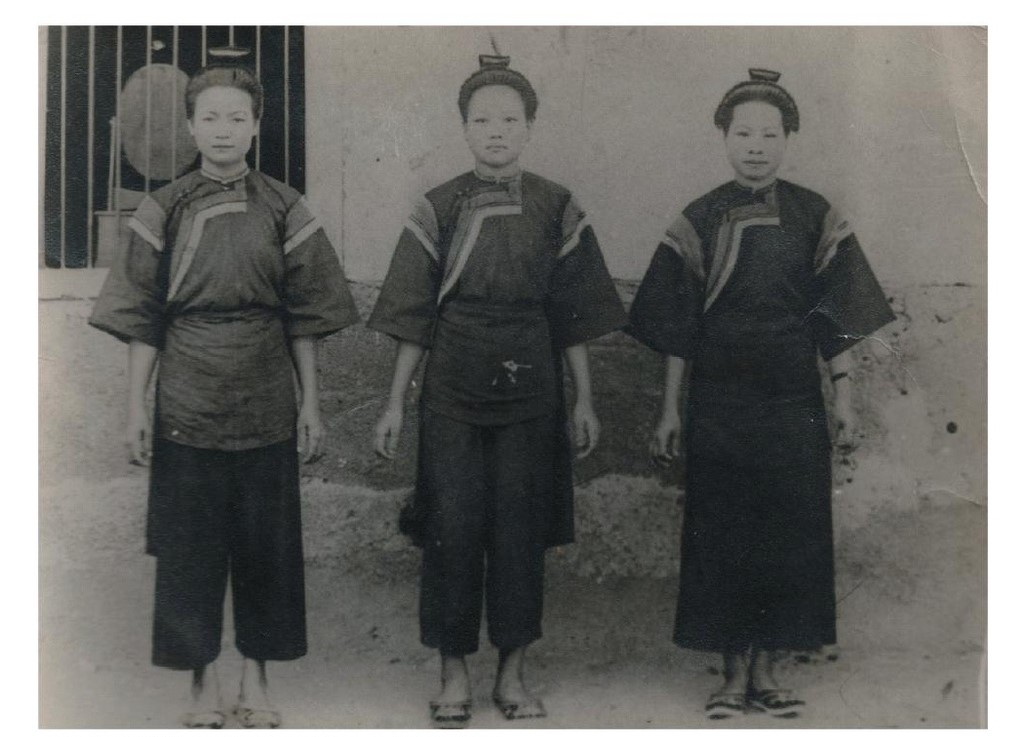
Hakka women in traditional attire in Kaohsiung, Taiwan, pre-1945

The Hakka population in Taiwan is around 4.6 million people today. Hakka comprise about 15 to 20% of Taiwanese people and form the second-largest ethnic group in the country. They are descended largely from Hakka who migrated from southern and northern Guangdong and western Fujian. The early Hakka immigrants were the island's first agriculturalists and formed the nucleus of the Chinese population, numbering tens of thousands at the time. They resided in "savage border districts, where land could be had for the taking, and where a certain freedom from official oppression was ensured." Back then, the Hakka on Taiwan had gained a reputation with the authorities of being turbulent and lawless.

In the past the Hakka in Taiwan owned matchlock muskets. Han people traded and sold matchlock muskets to the Taiwanese Indigenous peoples. The Indigenous peoples used their matchlock muskets to defeat the Americans in the Formosa Expedition. During the Sino-French War the Hakka and Indigenous peoples used their matchlock muskets against the French in the Keelung Campaign and Battle of Tamsui.

Liu Mingchuan took measures to reinforce Tamsui: in the river, nine torpedo mines were planted, the entrance was blocked with ballast boats filled with stone which were sunk on 3 September, matchlock-armed 'Hakka hill people' were used to reinforce the mainland Chinese battalion, and around the British Consulate and Customs House at the Red Fort hilltop, Shanghai Arsenal manufactured Krupp guns were used to form an additional battery.

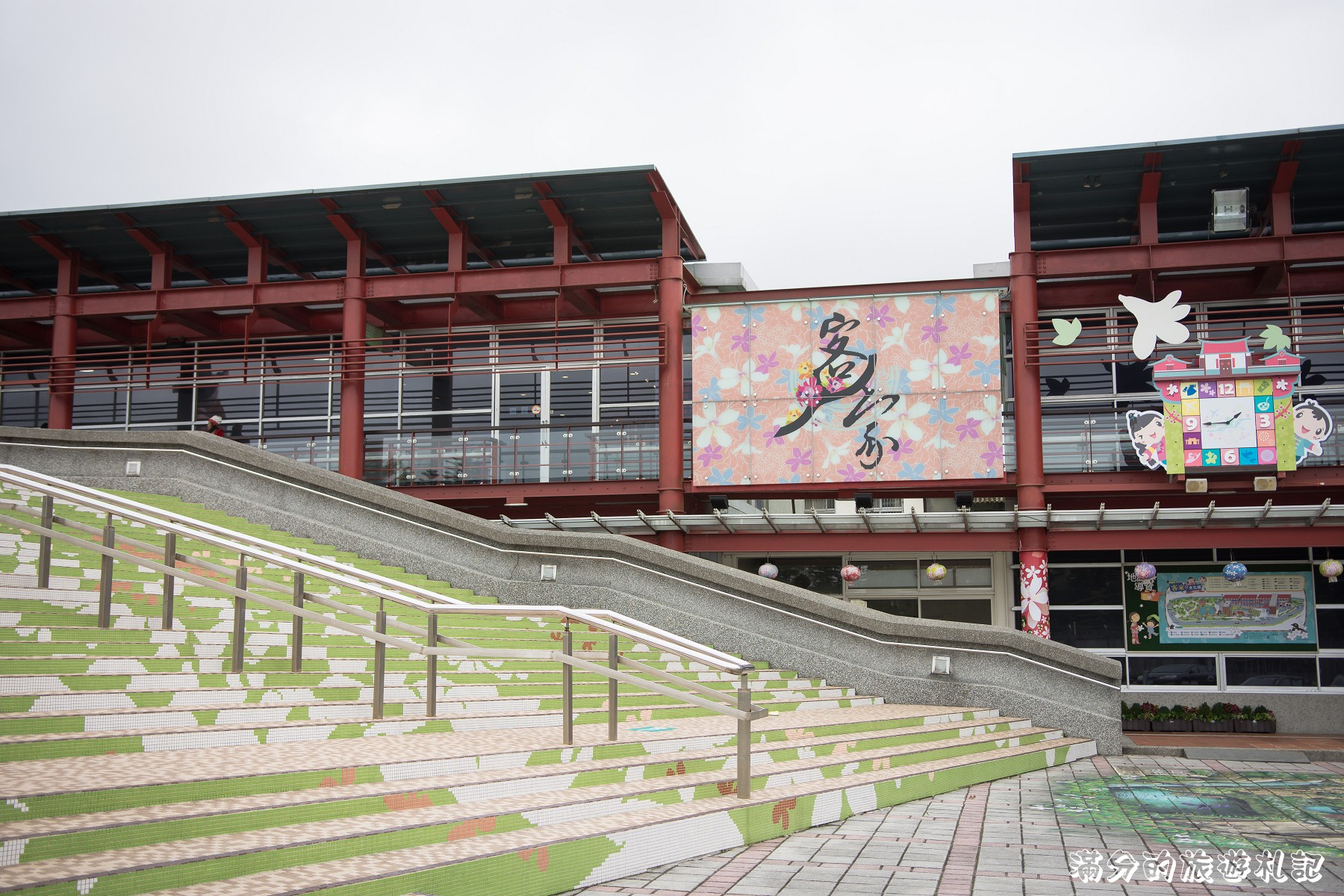
Taoyuan Hakka Culture Hall, Taiwan

Lin Ch'ao-tung (林朝棟) was the leader of the Hakka militia recruited by Liu Ming-ch'uan.

The Hakka used their matchlock muskets to resist the Japanese invasion of Taiwan. Hakka people and Indigenous peoples conducted an insurgency against Japanese rule, rising up against the Japanese in the Beipu uprising.

Taiwan's Hakka population concentrates in Hsinchu and Hsinchu County, Miaoli County and around Zhongli District in Taoyuan City and Meinong District in Kaohsiung and in Pingtung County, with smaller presences in Hualien County and Taitung County. In recent decades, many Hakka have moved to the largest metropolitan areas, including Taipei and Taichung.

On 28 December 1988, 14,000 Hakka protestors took to the streets in Taipei to demand the Nationalist government to "return our mother tongue", carrying portraits of Sun Yat-sen. The movement was later termed "1228 Return Our Mother Tongue Movement".

Hakka-related affairs in Taiwan are regulated by the Hakka Affairs Council. Hakka-related tourist attractions in Taiwan are Dongshih Hakka Cultural Park, Hakka Round House, Kaohsiung Hakka Cultural Museum, Meinong Hakka Culture Museum, New Taipei City Hakka Museum, Taipei Hakka Culture Hall and Taoyuan Hakka Culture Hall.

=== Hakka diaspora ===
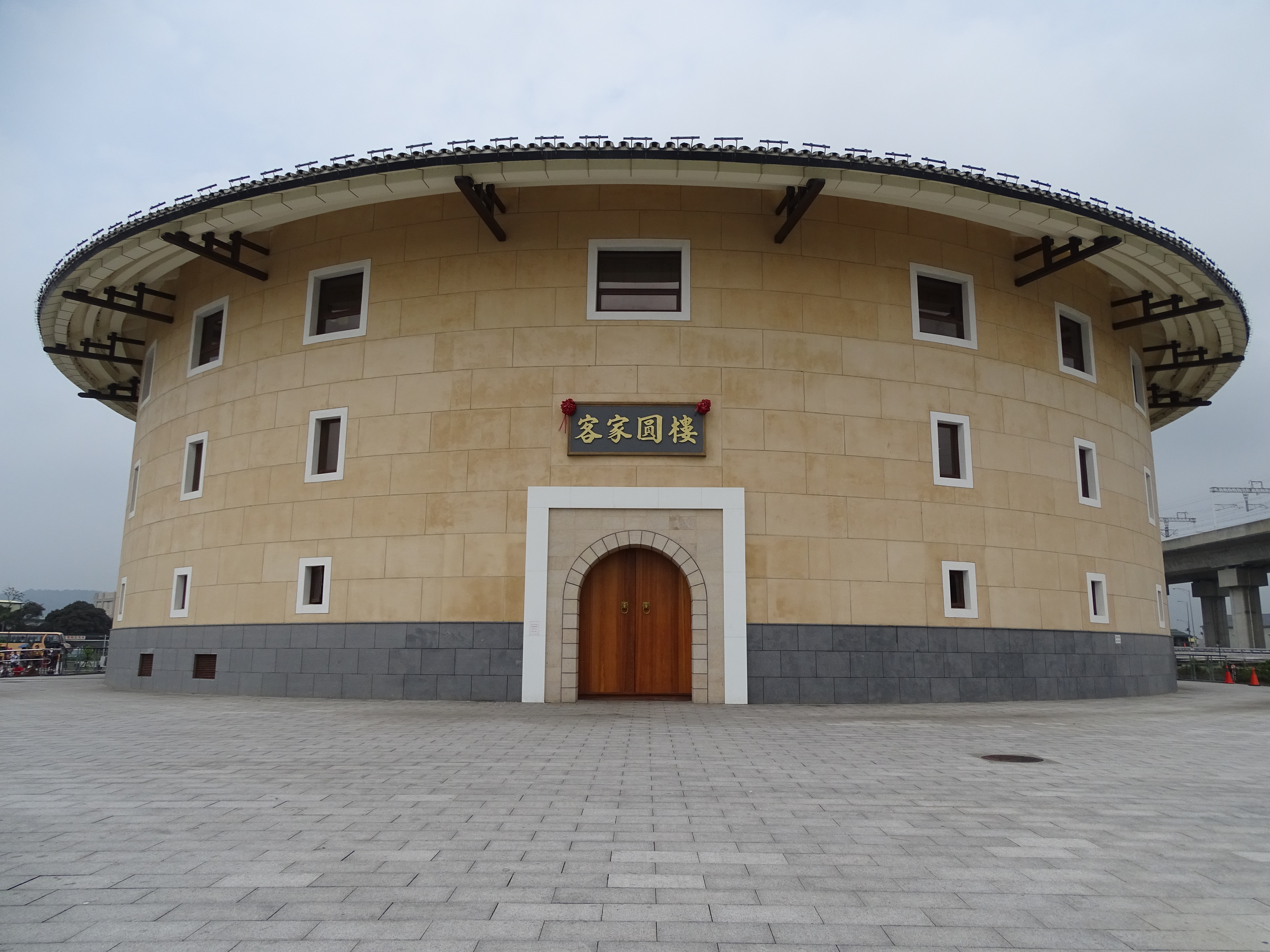
Hakka Round House in Miaoli County, Taiwan

=== Southeast Asia ===
==== Vietnam ====
There are two groups of Hakka in Vietnam. One is known as Ngái people and lives along the border with China in Northern Vietnam. Another group is Chinese immigrants to Southern Vietnam, known as Người Hẹ, and is located around Ho Chi Minh City and Vũng Tàu.

==== Cambodia ====
About 65% of the Hakka trace their roots back to Meizhou and Heyuan prefectures in Guangdong Province. About 70% of the Hakka people are found in Phnom Penh where they dominate professions in the field of Traditional Chinese Medicine and shoemaking. Hakka people are also found in Takéo Province, Stung Treng and Rattanakiri, consisting of vegetable growers and rubber plantation workers. Hakka communities in the provinces migrated to Cambodia through Tonkin and Cochinchina in the 18th and 19th centuries.

==== Thailand ====
There are no records as to when Hakka descendants arrived in Thailand. In 1901, Yu Cipeng, a Hakka member of The League Society of China came to visit Thailand and found that the establishment of many varied organizations among the Hakka was not good for unity. He tried to bring the two parties together and persuaded them to dissolve the associations in order to set up a new united one. In 1909, The Hakka Society of Siam was established and Chao Phraya Yommarat (Pan Sukhum), then interior minister, was invited to preside over the opening ceremony for the establishment of the society's nameplate, located in front of the Chinese shrine "Lee Tee Biao". Yang Liqing was its first president.

==== Singapore ====
In 2010, 232,914 people in Singapore reported Hakka ancestry. Singapore's most prominent Hakka is its founding prime minister, Lee Kuan Yew.

==== Malaysia ====
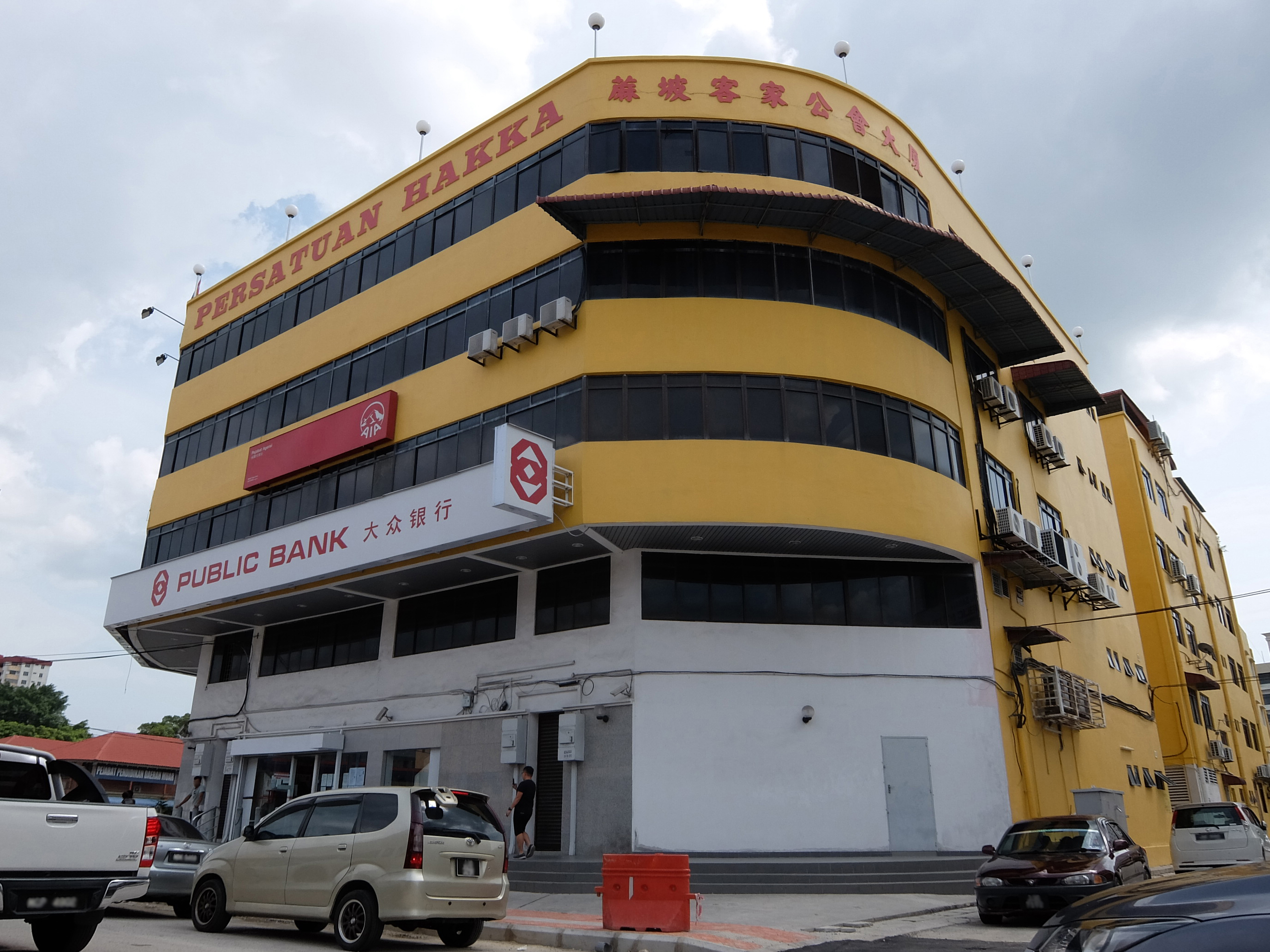
Muar Hakka Association in Johor, Malaysia

Hakka people form the second largest subgroup of the ethnic Chinese population of Malaysia, particularly in the peninsula, with several prominent Hakka figures emerging during colonial British rule. There are 1,729,000 people of Hakka ancestry in Malaysia as of 2016. Chung Keng Quee, "Captain China" of Perak and Penang, was the founder of the mining town of Taiping, the leader of the Hai San, a millionaire philanthropist and an innovator in the mining of tin, having been respected by both Chinese and European communities in the early colonial settlement. Another notable Hakka was Yap Ah Loy, who founded Kuala Lumpur and was a Kapitan Cina of the settlement from 1868 to 1885, bringing significant economic contributions and was also an influential figure among the ethnic Chinese.

In the district of Jelebu, Negeri Sembilan, Hakka people make up more than 90% of the Chinese subgroup, with the dialect itself acting as a lingua franca there. This has contributed greatly to the fact that the place is commonly known among Hakka Chinese as "Hakka Village". The greatest concentration of Hakka people in central peninsular Malaysia is in Ipoh, Perak and in Kuala Lumpur and its satellite cities in Selangor. Concentrations of Hakka people in Ipoh and surrounding areas are particularly high. The Hakka people in the Kinta Valley came mainly from the Jiaying Prefecture or Meixian, while those in Kuala Lumpur are mainly of Huizhou origin.

A large number of Hakka people are also found in Sarawak, particularly in the cities of Kuching and Miri, where there is a notable population of Hakka people who speak the "Ho Poh" variant of Hakka.

In Sabah, most of the ethnic Chinese are of Hakka descent. In the 1990s, the Hakka people formed around 57% of the total ethnic Chinese population in Sabah. Hakka is the lingua franca among the Chinese in Sabah to such an extent that Chinese of other subgroups who migrate to Sabah from other states in Malaysia and elsewhere usually learn the Hakka dialect, with varying degrees of fluency.

In 1882 the North Borneo Chartered Company opted to bring in Hakka labourers from Longchuan County, Guangdong. The first batch of 96 Hakka people brought to Sabah landed in Kudat on 4 April 1883 under the leadership of Luo Daifeng (Hakka: Lo Tai Fung). In the following decades Hakka immigrants settled throughout the state, with their main population centres in Kota Kinabalu (then known as Jesselton) and its surroundings (in the districts of Tuaran, Penampang, Ranau, Papar, Kota Belud and to a lesser extent in Kota Marudu), with a significant minority residing in Sandakan (mainly ex-Taiping revolutionists) and other large but smaller minority populations in other towns and districts, most notably in Tawau, Tenom, Kuala Penyu, Pitas, Tambunan, Lahad Datu, Semporna, Kunak, Sipitang, Beaufort, Keningau and Kudat. The British felt the development of North Borneo was too slow and in 1920 they decided to encourage Hakka immigration into Sabah. In 1901, the total Chinese population in Sabah was 13,897; by 1911, it had risen 100% to 27801. Hakka immigration began to taper off during World War 2 and declined to a negligible level in the late 1940s.

==== Indonesia ====
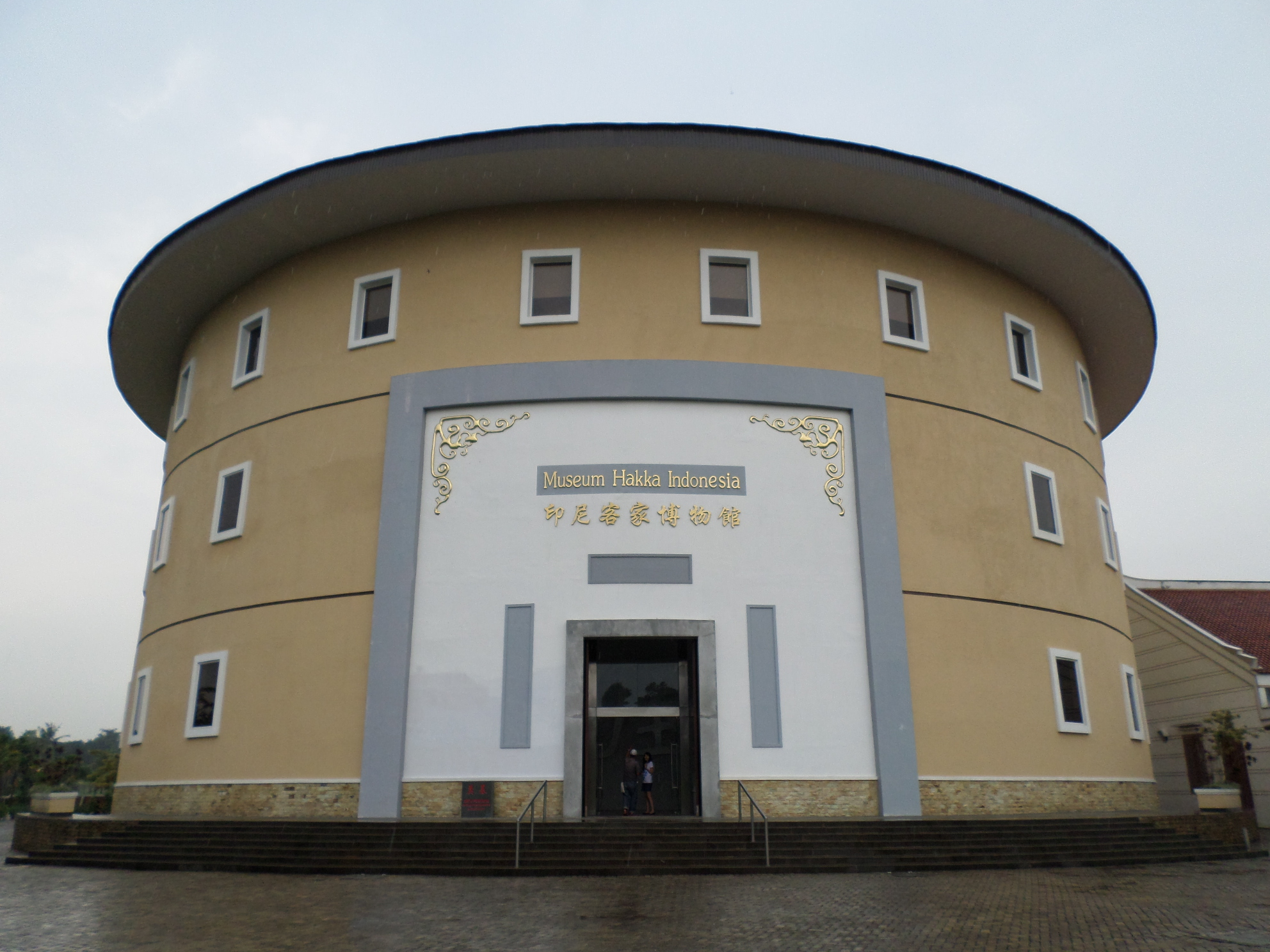
Indonesian Hakka Museum in Jakarta

Migration of Hakka people to Indonesia happened in several waves. The first wave landed in Riau Islands such as in Bangka Island and Belitung as tin miners in the 18th century. The second group of colonies were established along the Kapuas River in Borneo in the 19th century, predecessors to early Singapore residents. In the early 20th century, new arrivals joined their compatriots as traders, merchants and labourers in major cities such as Jakarta, Surabaya, Bandung, Medan, etc.

Some research shows that the establishment of the Silk Road created commercial trade for the Hakka people in the south or along the way, and created conditions for overseas migration. The book "An Overview of Hakka Migration History: Where are you from?" published by My China Roots & CBA Jamaica mentions that Hakka people traded with caravans, stayed overseas to facilitate business, and their descendants became immigrants; places such as Indonesia, Kolkata, Toronto, and Jamaica still retain a long history of Hakka culture and organization.

In Indonesia, Malaysia and Singapore, Hakka people are sometimes known as Khek, from the Hokkien pronunciation kheh. However, the use of the word 'Khek' is limited mainly to areas where the local Chinese population is mainly of Hokkien origin. In places where other Chinese subgroups predominate, the term 'Hakka' is still the more commonly used.

===== Bangka (in Indonesia) =====
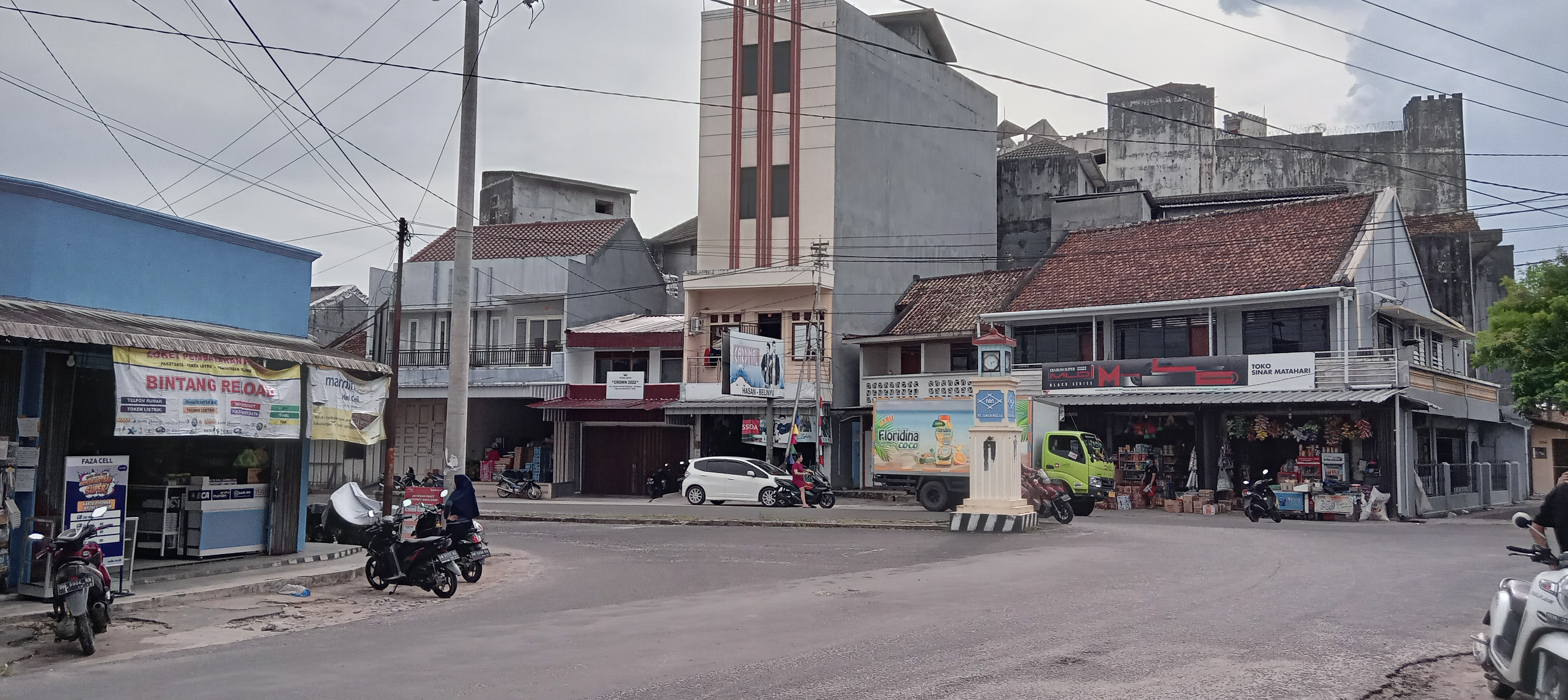
Belinyu, a little Hakka town in northern part of Bangka Island.

Hakka also live in Indonesia's largest tin producing islands of Bangka Belitung Islands province. They are the second largest ethnic group after Malays. The Hakka population in the province is also the second largest in Indonesia after West Kalimantan's and one of the highest percentages of Chinese living in Indonesia.

The first group of Hakka in Bangka and Belitung reached the islands in the 18th century from Guangdong. Many of them worked as tin mining labourers. Since then, they have remained on the island along with the native Malay. Their situation was much different from those of Chinese and native populations of other regions, where legal cultural conflicts were prevalent from the 1960s until 1999, after which Indonesian Chinese finally regained their cultural freedoms. Here they lived together peacefully and still practiced their customs and cultural festivals, while in other regions they were strictly banned by government legislation prior to 1999. Hakka on the island of Bangka spoke Hopo dialect mixed with Malay, especially in younger generations. Hakka spoken in Belinyu area in Bangka is considered to be standard.

===== West Kalimantan (in Indonesia) =====
Hakka people in Pontianak live alongside Teochew-speaking Chinese. While the Teochews are dominant in the centre of Pontianak, the Hakka are more dominant in small towns along the Kapuas River in the regencies of Sanggau, Sekadau and Sintang. Their Hakka dialect is originally Hopo, which was influenced by Teochew dialect and also has vocabulary from the local Malay and Dayak tribes. The Hakka were instrumental in the Lanfang Republic.

The Hakka in this region are descendants of gold prospectors who migrated from China in the late 19th century.

The Hakka in Singkawang and the surrounding regencies of Sambas, Bengkayang, Ketapang and Landak speak a different standard of Hakka dialect to the Hakka people along the Kapuas River. Originally West Borneo had diverse Hakka origins, but during the 19th century, a large number of people came from Jiexi, so many Hakka people in the region speak Hopo mixed with Wuhua and Huilai accents that eventually formed the dialect of Singkawang Hakka.

===== Jakarta (in Indonesia) =====
Hakka people in Jakarta mainly have roots from Meizhou, who came in the 19th century. Secondary migration of the Hakka people from other provinces like Bangka Belitung Islands and West Borneo came later.

==== Timor-Leste ====
There was already a relatively large and vibrant Hakka community in East Timor before the 1975 Indonesian invasion. According to an estimate by the local Chinese Timorese association, the Hakka population of Portuguese Timor in 1975 was estimated to be around 25,000 (including a small minority of other Chinese ethnicities from Macau, which like East Timor was a Portuguese colony). According to a book source, an estimated 700 Hakka were killed within the first week of invasion in Dili alone. No clear numbers had been recorded since many Hakka had already escaped to neighbouring Australia. The recent re-establishment of Hakka associations in the country registered approximately 2,400 Hakka remaining, organised into some 400 families, including part-Timorese ones.

The Timorese Hakka diaspora can currently be found in Darwin, Brisbane, Sydney and Melbourne in Australia; in Portugal; in Macau; and in other parts of the world in smaller numbers. They often are highly educated and many continue their education in either Taiwan or the People's Republic of China, while a majority of the younger generation prefer to study in Australia. The Australian government took some years to assess their claims to be genuine refugees and not illegal immigrants, as partially related to the political situation in East Timor at the time. As Asian countries were neither willing to accept them as residents nor grant them political asylum to the Timorese in general, they were forced to live as stateless persons for some time. Despite this condition, many Hakka had become successful, establishing restaurant chains, shops, supermarkets and import operations in Australia. Since the independence of Timor-Leste in 2000, some Hakka families have returned and invested in businesses in the newborn nation.

=== South Asia ===
==== India ====
There used to be 1500 Hakka people largely at Tangra, Kolkata and Bombay, arriving after the great British Raj violence and chaos.

However, from the 1960s, after armed fighting broke out, there has been a steady migration to other countries, which accelerated in the succeeding decades. The majority moved to Britain and Canada, while others went to the United States, Australia, Taiwan, Austria and Sweden. The predominant dialect of Hakka in these communities is Meixian.

Hakka people are the largest Chinese community in India after Chinese Cantonese people of Indian ancestry. Yap Kon Chung, the Hakka ambassador, protected and helped the Chinese residents in India during the time he held office in Kolkata until the late 2000s. Specifically, during the Sino-Indian war of 1962, oppression of Sino-Indian residents accused of Anti-Indian sentiment by Indian people was escalated. Yap then made appeals to Prime Minister Nehru to bridge a bond between the Indian and Chinese people. During his office, he was also the principal at a highly regarded school as well as a political facilitator who helped many families migrate to other countries such as Britain, Canada, the United States and parts of Europe, until he himself migrated to Toronto, Canada to join his family. Yap died surrounded by family on 18 April 2014, at the age of 97.

=== Africa ===
==== South Africa ====
Most Hakka people are from the Meixian area.

==== Mauritius ====
The vast majority of Mauritian Chinese people are Hakka. Most Mauritian Hakka people who emigrated to Mauritius in the mid-1940s came from Northeastern Guangdong, especially from the Meizhou or Meixian region.

In 2008, the total population of Sino-Mauritian, consisting of Hakka and Cantonese, is around 35,000. As of 2025, local sources estamate that number has fallen to approximately 10,000.

==== Réunion ====
Many Chinese people in Réunion are of Hakka origin. They either came to Réunion as indentured workers or as voluntary migrants.

=== Americas ===
==== United States ====
Hakka from all over the world have also migrated to the US. The New England Hakka Association reminds its members not to forget their roots; an example is the blog “Searching for My Hakka Roots” by Ying Han Brach. Another group is the Hakka Association of New York, which aims to promote Hakka culture across the five boroughs of New York City. In the mid-1970s, the Hakka Benevolent Association in San Francisco was founded by Tu Chung. The association has strong community ties and offers scholarships to their young members. There are significant Hakka American communities in San Francisco, San Jose, Seattle and Los Angeles.

There are around 20,000 Taiwanese Hakka people in the United States.

==== Canada ====
There are several Hakka communities across Canada, such as the Hakka Heritage Alliance.

==== Jamaica ====
Most Chinese Jamaican people are Hakka, coming mainly from Dongguan, Huiyang and Bao'an counties of Guangdong Province. Nearly 5,000 Hakka people arrived in Jamaica in three major voyages between 1854 and 1884. Substantial migration of Jamaican Hakka people to the US and Canada also occurred during the 1960s and 1970s.

==== Suriname ====
Chinese people in Suriname are homogeneous as a group and the great majority can trace their roots to Huidong'an (惠东安). A notable Hakka person is President Henk Chin A Sen.

==== Guyana ====
Chinese people are a small minority at Guyana. Guyana's most prominent Hakka Chinese person is its first president, Arthur Chung.

=== Oceania ===
==== Australia ====
Hakka people first arrived in Australia in the 1880s. Hakka arrivals were halted along with other Chinese immigrants during the White Australia policy era from 1901 to 1973 and resumed thereafter. Some estimate that there are now 100,000 Hakka people in Australia.

==== New Zealand ====
There are people of Hakka descent in New Zealand.

==== Tahiti ====
Hakka people first arrived in Papara, Tahiti in 1865.

== Population ==
At a 1994 seminar of the World Hakka Association held in Meixian, statistics showed that there were 6,562,429 Hakka people living abroad.

In 2000, the worldwide population of Hakka was estimated at 36,059,500 and in 2010 it was estimated at 40,745,200.

Another estimate is that approximately 36 million Hakka people are scattered throughout the world. More than 31 million live in over 200 cities and counties spread throughout five provinces of China (Guangdong, Jiangxi, Guangxi, Fujian, Hunan) as well as Hong Kong.

Region	Hakka	Chinese	Total	Percentage	Majority	Source
Taiwan	4,202,000	22,813,000	23,374,000	18.4%	Second largest	Hakka Affairs Council, Taiwan, 2014
Hong Kong	1,250,000 est	6,643,000	7,300,000	18.8%	Second largest	Prof Lau Yee Cheung, Chinese University of Hong Kong, 2010
Singapore	232,914	2,794,000	3,771,700	8.3%	Fourth largest	Singapore census, 2010
Malaysia	1,650,000	6,550,000	30,116,000	25.2%	Second largest	Malaysia census, 2015
Thailand	1,502,846	9,392,792	67,091,371	16.0%	Second largest	The World Factbook, 2012

== Hakkaology ==
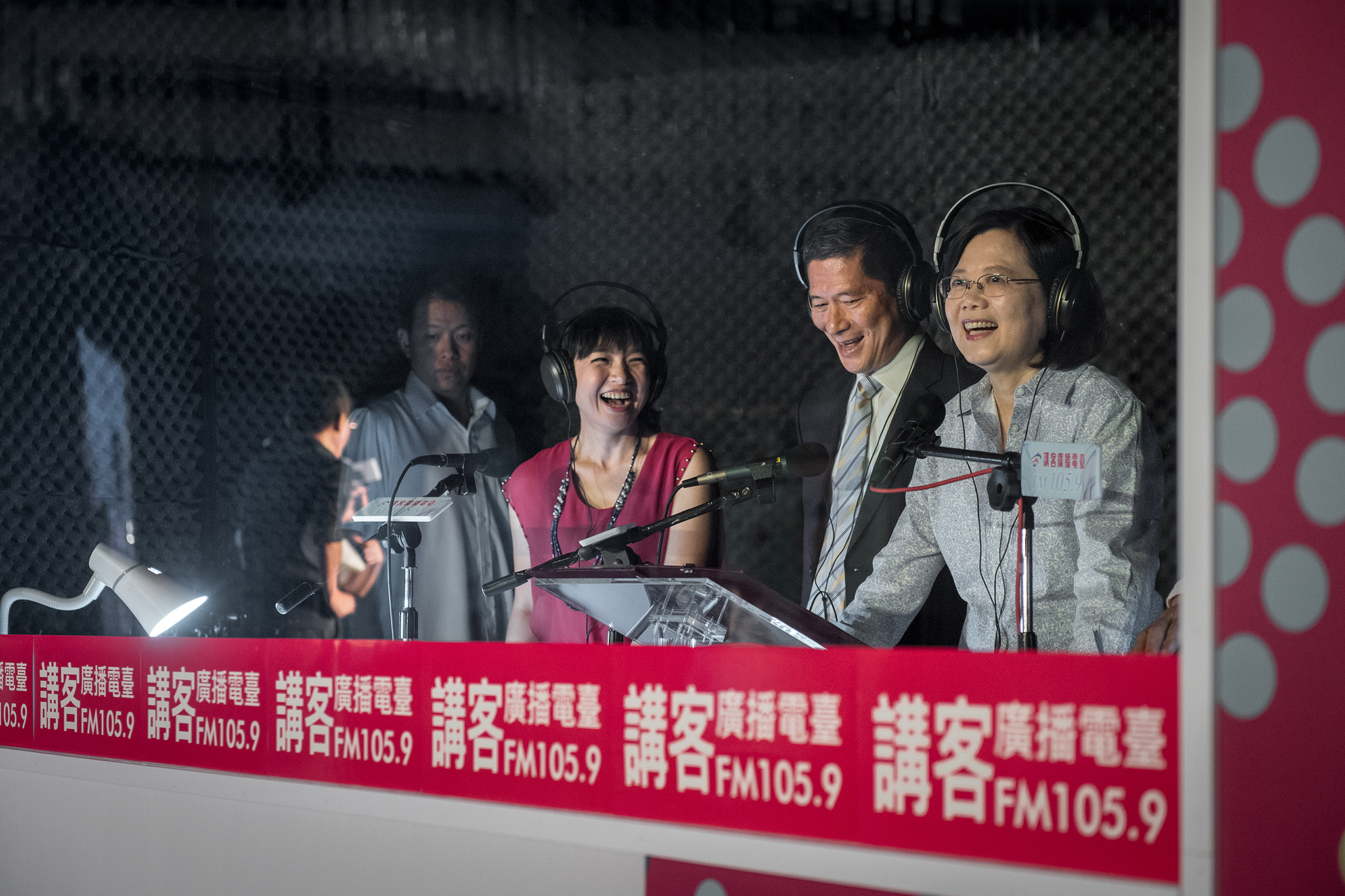
Tsai Ing-wen, President of Taiwan of Hakka descent, attended the "Lecturer Hakka Language Radio Broadcasting", to give a speech

Hakkaology (客家學) is the academic study of the Hakka people and their culture. It encompasses their origins, identity, language, traits, architecture, customs, food, literature, history, politics, economics, diaspora and genealogical records.

The study of the Hakka people first drew attention to Chinese and foreign scholars, adventurers, missionaries, travellers and authors of the Taiping Heavenly Kingdom era. Ernest John Eitel, a prominent German missionary, was one of those who took a great interest in this area. Theodore Hamberg, who also wrote an early English-language account of the Taiping Rebellion, is also considered a forefather of Hakka studies in the West.

Many foreign scholars admired the Hakka people. Prominent sinologist Victor Purcell stated that the Hakka people “have a stubbornness of disposition that distinguishes them from their fellow Chinese”.

== Political and military leadership ==
It has been often commented that the Hakka people have significantly influenced the course of modern Chinese and overseas Chinese history, particularly as a source of revolutionary, political, and military leaders, as well as presidents and prime ministers.

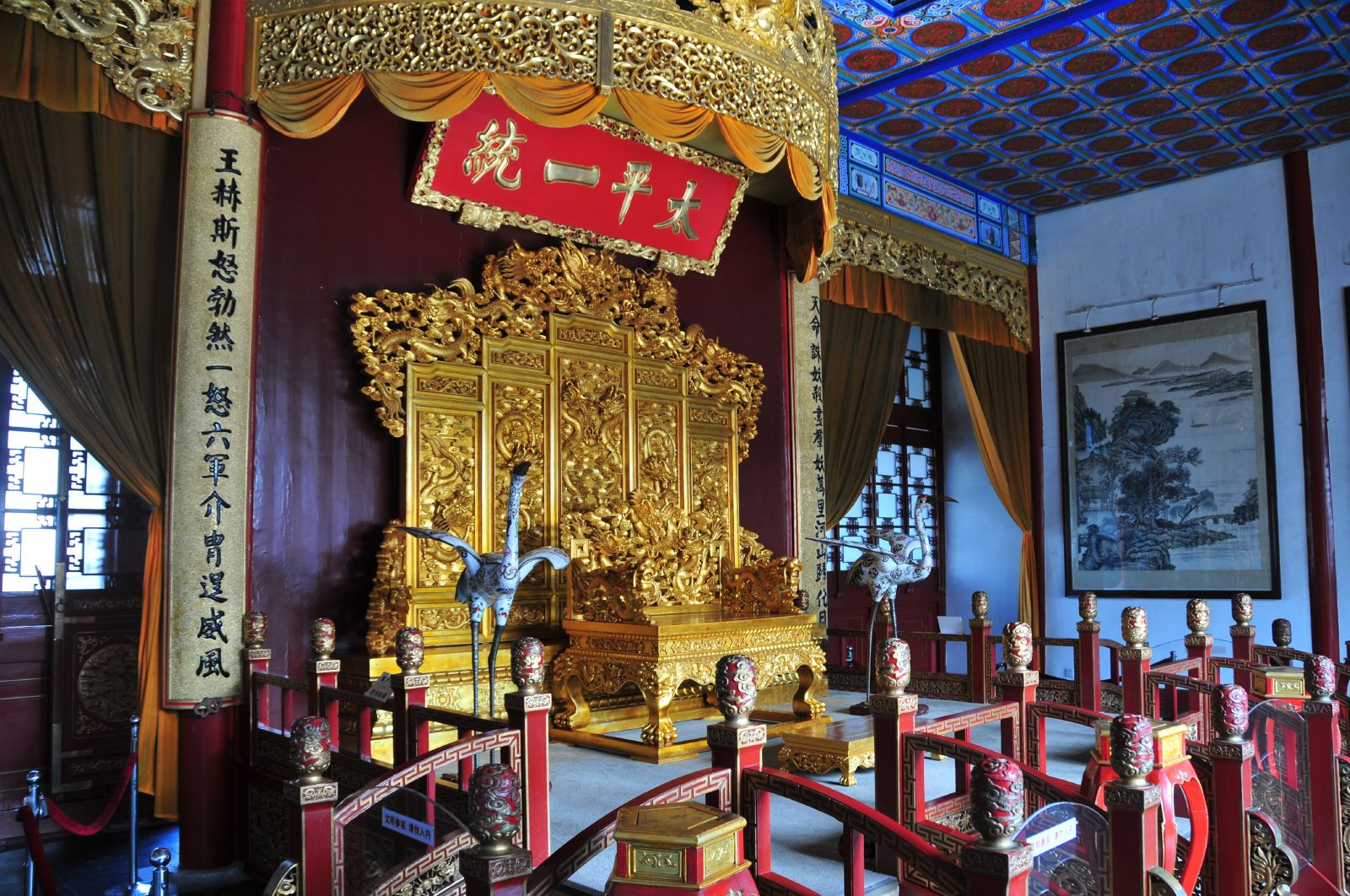

Hakka people started and formed the backbone of the Taiping Heavenly Kingdom, the largest uprising in the modern history of China. The uprising, also known as Jintian Uprising, originated at the Hakka village of Jintian in Guiping, Guangxi province. It was led by the failed Qing scholar, Hong Xiuquan, who was influenced by Protestant missionaries. Hong's charisma tapped into a consciousness of national dissent which he identified with his personal interpretations of the Christian message. His following, who were initially Hakka peasants from Guangxi, grew across the southern provinces.

The Taiping army captured towns and cities from the defenders, killing all Manchu children by smashing their heads with rocks. Four of the six top Taiping leaders were Hakka: Hong Xiuquan, Feng Yunshan, Yang Xiuqing and Shi Dakai. Hong Rengan, the Premier of the Kingdom, was the first person in China to advocate a federal government and reform. The kingdom lasted from 1851 to 1864.

Hakka people continued to play leading roles during the Xinhai Revolution that overthrew the Qing dynasty and the republican years of China. When Sun Yat-sen was a child, he used to listen to an old Taiping soldier telling them stories about the heroics of the Taipings. This influenced Sun, and he would one day proclaim that he shall be the second Hong Xiuquan. Sun was to become the father of modern China in the minds of many, and several of his contemporaries were fellow Hakka people.

Zheng Shiliang, a medical student and classmate of Sun, led the Huizhou Uprising (惠州起義) in 1900. Huizhou is an area in Guangdong province where most of the population are Hakka. Deng Zhiyu led the Huizhou Qinühu Uprising (惠州七女湖起義) in 1907. The Four Martyrs of Honghuagang (紅花崗四烈士) were all Hakka—one of which was Wen Shengcai, who assassinated the Manchu general, Fu Qi, in 1911.

Brothers Hsieh Yi-qiao and Hsieh Liang-mu raised the 100,000 Chinese Yuan needed for the Huanghuagang Uprising from the overseas Chinese community in Nanyang (Southeast Asia) in 1911. At least 27 of the 85 (initially 72 because only 72 bodies could be identified) martyrs of Huanghuagang were Hakka. Yao Yuping led the Guangdong Northern Expeditionary Force (廣東北伐軍) to successive victories against the Qing Army, which were vital in the successful defence of the Provisional Government in Nanjing and Puyi's prompt abdication.

Liao Zhongkai and Deng Keng were Sun Yat-sen's main advisors on financial and military matters respectively. A big majority of the soldiers in the Guangdong Army (粵軍) were Hakka.

In Nationalist China, Eugene Chen, of Hakka descent, was a significant foreign minister in the 1920s. Some of the most renowned Nationalist China generals: Chen Mingshu, Chen Jitang, Xue Yue, Zhang Fakui, and Luo Zhuoying amongst many others, were Hakka as well.

During the Chinese Civil War, Hakka-occupied Communist bases reached a peak of more than 30,000 square kilometres and a population that numbered more than three million, covering mostly Hakka areas of Jiangxi and Fujian provinces. The Hakka city of Ruijin was the capital of the rebellion.

When it was overrun in 1934 by the Nationalist army in the Fifth of its Encirclement campaigns, the Communists began their famous Long March with 86,000 soldiers, of which more than 70% were Hakka people. The Fifth Encirclement Campaign was led by Nationalist Hakka general, Xue Yue. During the retreat, the Communists managed to strike a deal with the Hakka warlord controlling Guangdong province, Chen Jitang, to let them pass through Guangdong without a fight. After the Communists took over all of mainland China and the People's Liberation Army established its rank structure from 1955 to 1964, the highest number of generals, totalling 54, came from the small Hakka county of Xingguo in Jiangxi province. The county had also previously produced 27 Nationalist generals. Xingguo county is thus popularly known as the Generals' County.

During the same period, there were 132 Hakka out of 325 generals in Jiangxi, 63 Hakka out of 83 generals in Fujian, and 8 Hakka out of 12 generals in Guangdong respectively, not mentioning those from Guangxi, Sichuan and Hunan. The number could have been significantly higher if the majority of the personnel who started the Long March had not perished before reaching its destination. Only less than 7,000 of the original 86,000 personnel had survived it.

Prominent Hakka communist leaders include: Marshal Zhu De, the founder of the Red Army, later known as the People's Liberation Army; Ye Ting, Commander-in-chief, New Fourth Army, one of the two main Chinese communist forces fighting the Japanese during the World War II (the other main communist force, Eighth Route Army, was commanded by Zhu De); Marshal Ye Jianying, governor of Guangdong; and Hu Yaobang, where the memorial for his funeral sparked off a pro-democracy movement which led to the Tiananmen Square protests in 1989. In Guangdong, China's most prosperous province, the "Hakka clique" (客家帮) has consistently dominated the provincial government. Guangdong's Hakka governors include Ye Jianying, Ding Sheng, Ye Xuanping and Huang Huahua.

Besides playing major roles in all the three major revolutions of China, Hakka people had also been prominently involved in many of the wars against foreign intrusion of China. During the First Opium War, Lai Enjue led the Qing navy against the British at the Battle of Kowloon in 1839 and Yan Botao commanded the coastal defence at the Battle of Amoy in 1841. Feng Zicai and Liu Yongfu were instrumental in the defeat of the French at the Battle of Bang Bo which led to the French Retreat from Lạng Sơn and the conclusion of the war in 1885. When the Japanese invaded Taiwan, the Hakka militia forces led by Qiu Fengjia, were able to put up a stiff resistance to the Japanese when the Qing army could not. During the Battle of Shanghai in the Second Sino-Japanese War in 1937, the heroism of Xie Jinyuan and his troops, known as the "Eight Hundred Warriors" (八百壯士) in Chinese history, gained international attention and lifted flagging Chinese morale in their successful Defence of Sihang Warehouse against the better equipped Japanese. However, in the ensuing Battle of Nanjing, seventeen Nationalist generals were killed in action, of which six were Hakka.

During the war against the Japanese, both the commander-in-chiefs of the two main Chinese communist forces, Eighth Route Army and New Fourth Army, are Hakka people: Zhu De and Ye Ting. On the Nationalist side, Xue Yue and Zhang Fakui were commander-in-chiefs for the 9th and 4th War Zones respectively. Called the "Patton of Asia" by the West and the "God of War" (戰神) by the Chinese, Xue was China's most outstanding general during the war, having won several major battles that killed hundreds of thousands of Japanese troops. Luo Zhuoying was the commander-in-chief for the 1st Route Expeditionary Forces, Burma (China's first participation of a war overseas), 1942.

During the Japanese occupation of Hong Kong from 1941 to 1945, the Dong River Column guerrilla force (東江縱隊) was a constant harassment to the Japanese troops. The force, whose members were mostly Hakka people and led by its commander Zeng Sheng, was highly successful due to its strong Hakka network. Noteworthy accomplishments of the partisan guerrilla force included the aiding of British and Commonwealth (British Raj Colonial rulers) prisoners of war to escape successfully from Japanese internment camps and the rescuing of twenty American pilots who parachuted into Hong Kong when they were shot down.

Overseas Hakka people have also been prominent politicians in the countries they had migrated to, many of which are leading political figures of the countries or the Chinese communities there. Since the 20th century, there have been 20 Hakka people who had become heads of state or heads of government in different countries.

The historical trajectory of the Hakka people has led some historians to draw parallels with that of other socioeconomically successful minority groups around the world, such as the Ashkenazi Jews and Irish Protestants, indicating that their patterns of culture and achievement may be closely linked to certain distinct historical experiences and sociocultural contexts.

== In popular culture ==
- The Guest People (Chinese: 客家之歌), a 1997 30-episode Singapore television drama about four young Hakka men who migrated from China to Singapore in the 1950s and were caught in the tumultuous anti-colonial period of the country's history. The Hakka-language version of the drama was broadcast in Taiwan. The drama was nominated for the Best Drama Series awards in the Asian Television Awards and the New York Television Festival, 1998.
- 1895 or Blue Brave: The Legend of Formosa 1895 (Chinese: 1895乙未), a 2008 Taiwan Hakka-language film about the Hakka militias fighting the Japanese during the Japanese invasion of Taiwan in 1895. The edited version for television won the Best Drama Series award in the Asian Television Awards, 2009.
- The Great Southern Migration (Chinese: 大南迁 or 葛藤凹), a 2012 32-episode China television drama about the Hakka people's migration to Southern China during the late Tang dynasty in the 9th century.
- Hakka Women (Chinese: 客家女人) or To Be or Not to Be (Chinese: 来生不做香港人), a 2014 25-episode Hong Kong television drama about the lives of two Hakka sisters separated when young, one in Hong Kong and the other in China.
- Gold Leaf (Chinese: 茶金), a 2021 Taiwanese period drama about the booming tea trade in Taiwan during the 1950 and a Hakka Taiwanese tea trader family owned tea exporting company.

== See also ==
- Hakka architecture
- Hakka cuisine
- Hakka hill songs
- Hakka language
- Hakka opera
- Larut War
- Lee Youn Chin
- Punti–Hakka Clan Wars
- Tea-picking opera
