= Taoyuan City Hakka Cultural Park =

Cultural center in Longtan, Taoyuan City, Taiwan

- 桃園市客家文化館
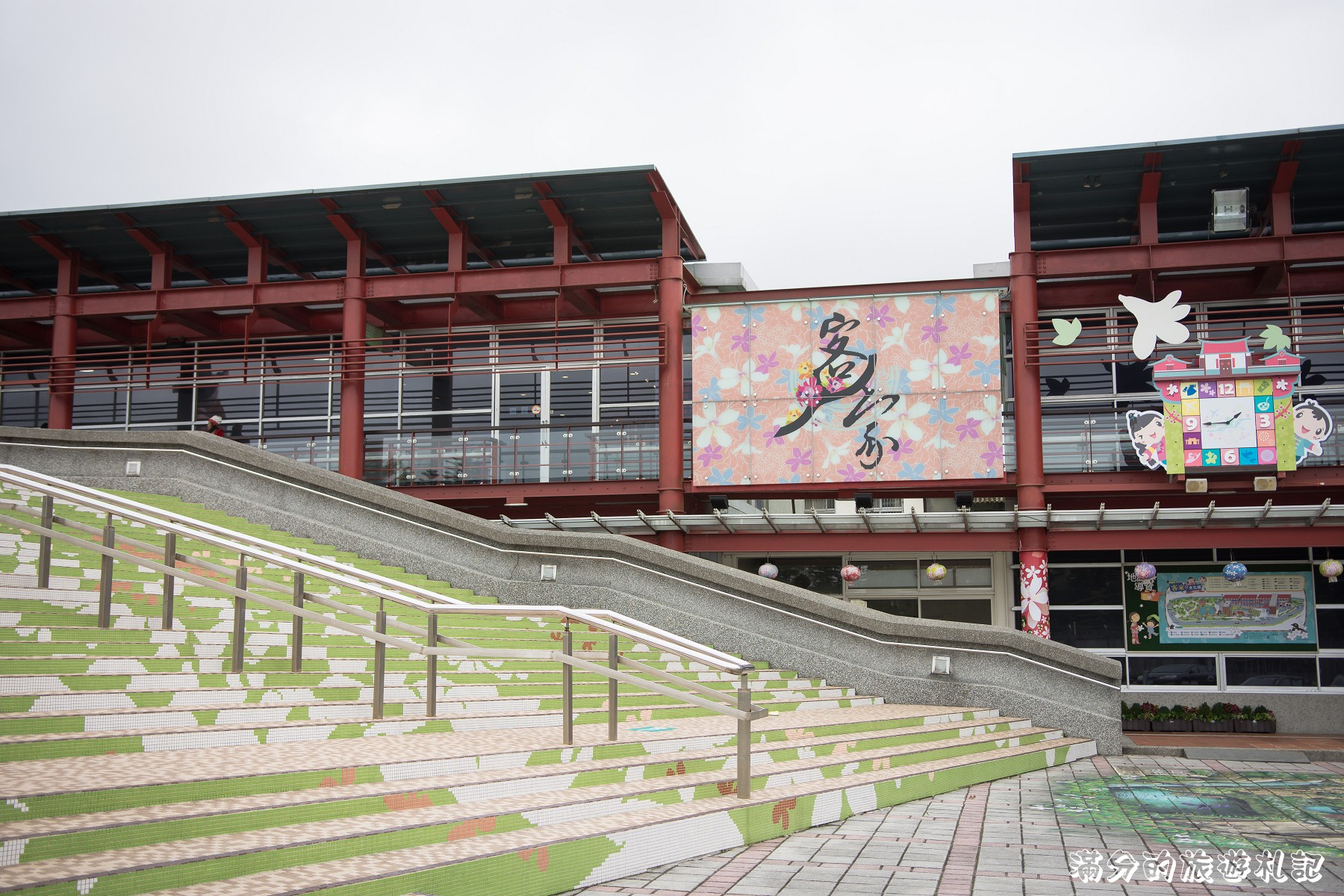
- Interactive map of the Taoyuan City Hakka Cultural Park area

General information
- Type: cultural center
- Location: Longtan, Taoyuan City, Taiwan
- Coordinates: 24°50′43.1″N 121°14′04.7″E
- Opened: 2007

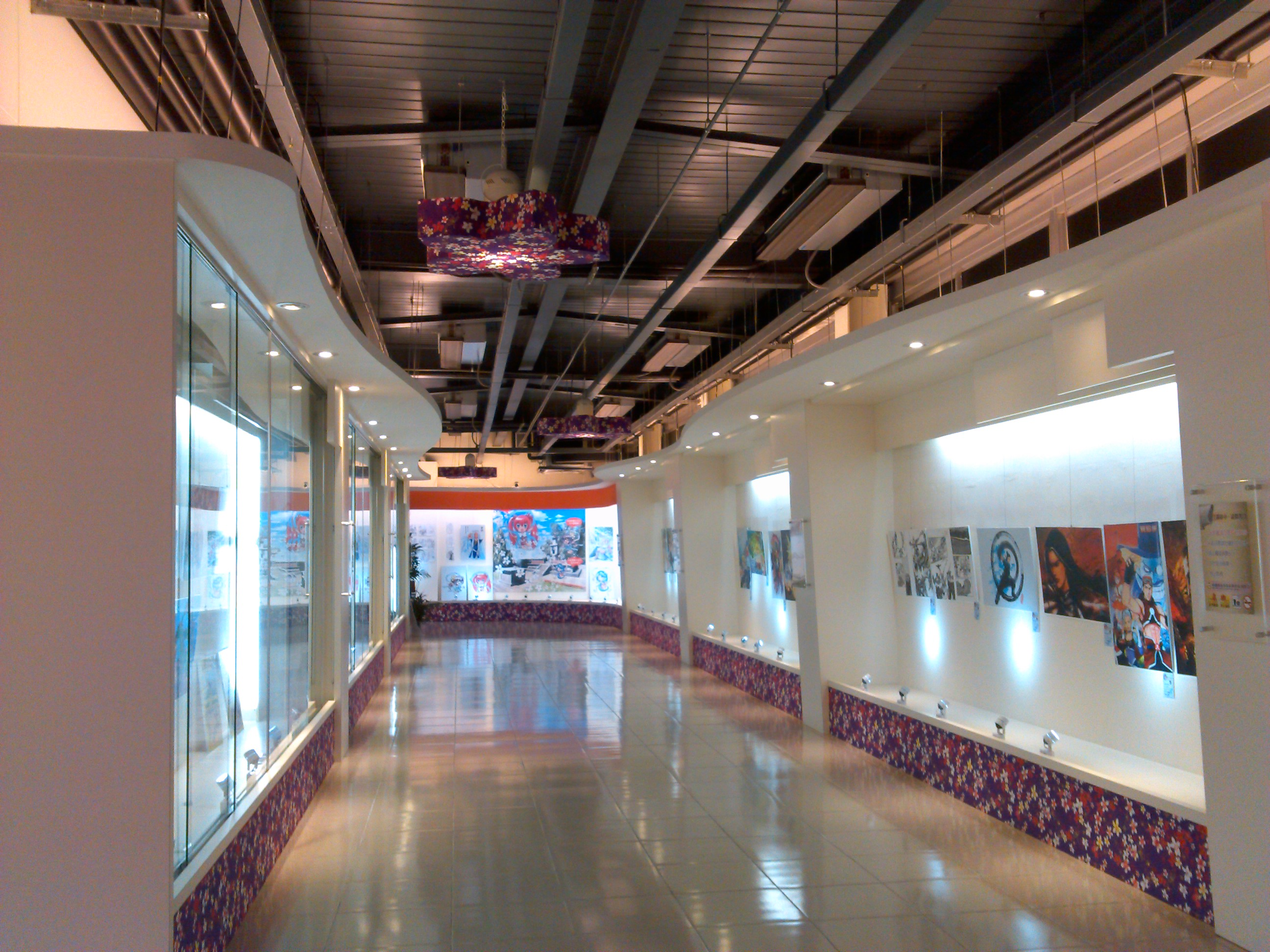
Exhibition hall

The Taoyuan City Hakka Cultural Park (traditional Chinese: 桃園市客家文化館; simplified Chinese: 桃园市客家文化馆; pinyin: Táoyuán Shì Kèjiā Wénhuàguǎn) is a Hakka cultural center in Longtan District, Taoyuan City, Taiwan.

== History ==
The hall was built in 2007.

== Exhibitions ==
The hall mainly displays the exhibition of Hakka culture, antiques and introduces all kinds of Hakka activities.

== Events ==
The hall regularly holds exhibitions, such as the 2016 Hakka Tung Blossom Festival in Taoyuan etc. The hall also holds various Hakka language-related events to promote the use of the language among youths and offer financial incentives to youths who wish to take the language test.

== See also ==
- List of museums in Taiwan
