= Lo Hsiang-lin =

Chinese academic (1906–1978)

Lo Hsiang-lin (羅香林)
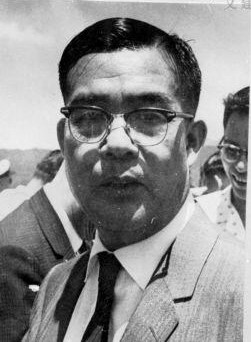
- Born: 19 October 1906; Ningxin, Xingning, Guangdong, Qing Dynasty
- Died: 20 April 1978 (aged 71); British Hong Kong
- Other name: Lò Hiông-lìm
- Occupations: Writer, researcher, linguist, lecturer
- Known for: Hakka Studies

Chinese name
- Simplified Chinese: 罗香林
- Traditional Chinese: 羅香林
Transcriptions
Standard Mandarin
- Hanyu Pinyin: Luó Xiānglín
- Wade–Giles: Lo Hsiang-lin

Lo Hsiang-lin (19 October 1906 – 20 April 1978) was one of the most renowned researchers in Hakka language and culture. His pioneering research in Hakka genealogy showed that the Hakka are Han Chinese.

== Background ==
Lo Hsiang-lin was born in Xingning, Guangdong in 1906 and died in 1978. He attended Xingmin middle school, Tsinghua University, and Yenching University. From 1956 to 1968 he was a professor in Hong Kong University's Chinese department. In 1969, he became the first director of the Research Institute of Chinese Literature and History, Chu Hai College.

== Hong Kong ==
In 1963, Lo Hsiang-lin was widely recognized for his depictions of Hong Kong as a center for cultural interchange between Eastern and Western civilizations, saying, "Friendship between nations, like friendship between persons, grows only where there is mutual respect and give and take."

== Family ==
His eldest son, Winston W. Lo(羅文) was a historian and sinologist who served as a professor at Florida State University.

== Publications ==
- Hong Kong in the Cultural Interchange of East and West (香港與中西文化之交流)
- History of Chinese Nationalities (民族生存論)
- Dr. Sun Yat-sen's Family Lineage (國父家世源流考)
- Introduction to Hakka Studies (客家研究導論)
- Study of Family Lineage in Hong Kong History (香港前代史)
- 客家源流考
