= Lee Youn Chin =

Chinese Hakka community leader in India (1906 - 1991)

- 李雲珍
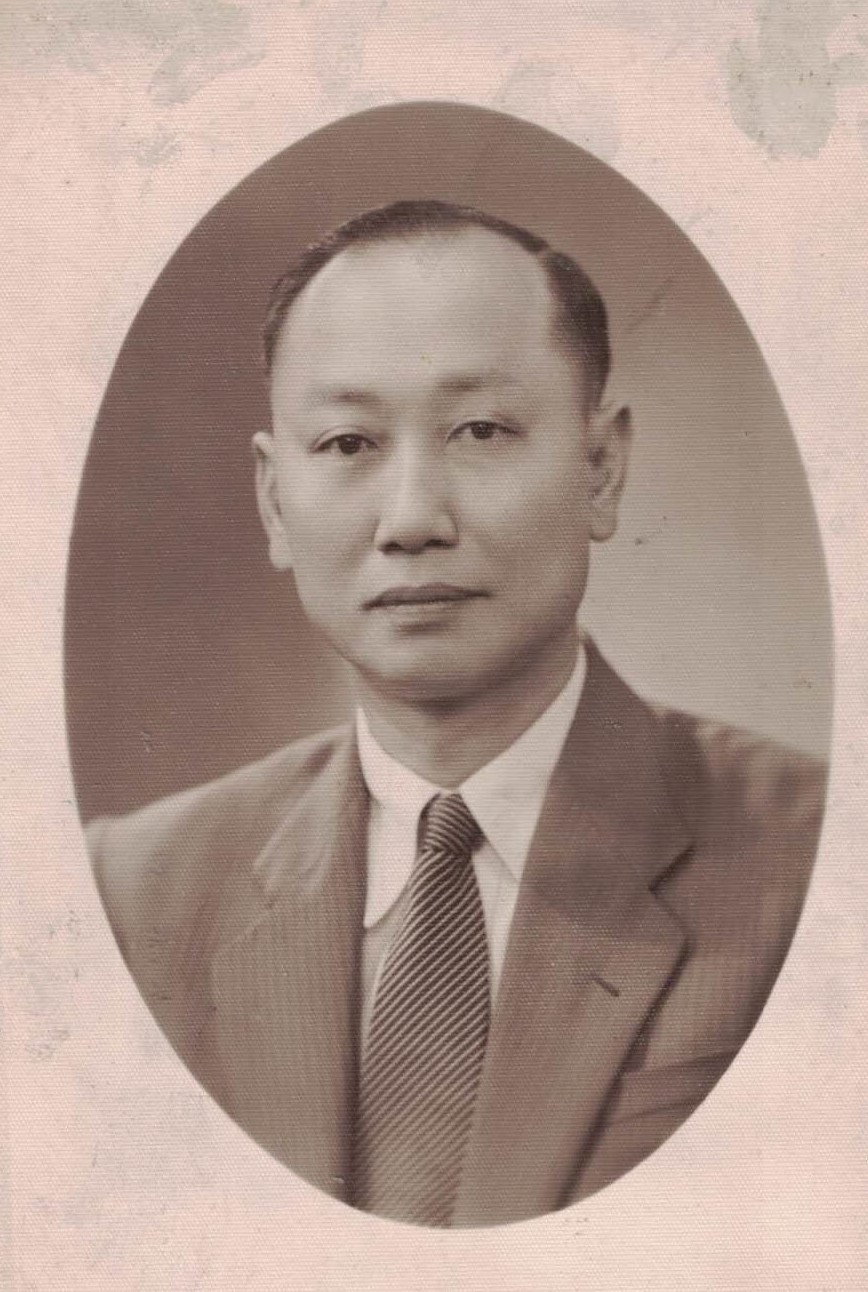
- Born: 1906; Guangdong, Qing Empire (present day China)
- Died: 1991/10/08; Kolkata, India
- Burial place: Chinese Cemetery, Kolkata, India
- Citizenship: Indian
- Years active: 1933–1989
- Board member of: The Chinese Tannery Owners Association The Overseas Chinese Commerce Association of India Overseas Chinese Commerce Journal 'Seong Pow' Pei May High School
- Spouse: Koo Tek Xiu
- Children: 10
- Parents: Lee Sie Xhien (father); Zhu Juying (mother)

Lee Youn Chin (Chinese: 李雲珍; pinyin: Lǐ Yúnzhēn; 1906–1991) was a Chinese Hakka community leader in India for over half a century. Lee was instrumental in founding the Chinese Tannery Owners Association of India, the newspaper Seong Pow (Overseas Chinese Commerce of India), and the new Pei May High School. These institutions for commerce, education, and journalism had a profound impact on the Hakka Chinese settlement in Kolkata, India.

== Personal life ==
Lee Youn Chin was born in 1906 in the Hakka village of Meixian, Guangdong, China. He was the fourth of five children of Lee Sie Xhien and Zhu Juying, with one older sister and four brothers. When Lee was six years old his father died, and he was raised by his mother and relatives. He completed high school and was encouraged to join the next wave of migrants to British India. At the age of 18, he emigrated to Kolkata. The Chinese people in India had earlier pioneers, but the first to arrive in Kolkata was Yang Tai Chow.

Lee had uncles already settled in Kolkata, who gave him shelter. At his uncle’s shoe shop, he worked and took on an apprenticeship. He saved money over a few years to visit China, where he married his wife, Koo Tek Xiu. He took her to India. They had a business selling products used in the leather industry. Lee prospered and also owned several shoe shops with his other relatives. He purchased a large plot of land and built his house, where he moved in with his ten children: seven daughters and three sons. He later expanded and established his company, the Lee Youn Chin Tannery, adjoining it. He was granted Indian citizenship under the British Raj.

Lee lived a long life of community involvement and service. He died in 1991 and was buried in Kolkata.

== Hakka community ==
Lee founded and was the chairman of the Chinese Tannery Owners Association, the Overseas Chinese Commerce Association of India, and the founder of the local Chinese-language newspaper Seong Pow (Overseas Chinese Commerce of India). When the small and old Pei May school needed more space, Lee built a new school on a large plot of land. Construction started in later 1940s, but was interrupted over payment issues. The association filed a case in court. Classes began in the 1950s in the new, but incomplete, building. After a period, another of the Association's English-speaking managers was assigned and a new builder was brought in to complete its construction. These institutions formed an integral part of the community, which flourished as the largest minority culture in Kolkata. There were 1,466 Chinese in Chinatown in 1901, and by 1936 there were 14,000. By the mid 1990s, the unofficial population count was estimated to be around 20,000.

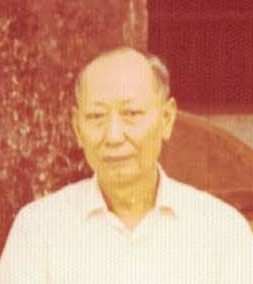
Lee Youn Chin

Tanneries were the largest businesses of the growing community, with smaller trades such as carpentry, shoe shops, restaurants, herbal stores, beauty parlors, and dentistry. Tangra or Dhapa, was located outside the city where the majority of the Chinese settled. Chinatown or Tiretta Bazaar was situated in the interior part of the city.

Working with him on the Chinese Tannery Owners Association board were:

Chen Zaan Xhen, Chung Yat Xheng, Lee Vaan Yao, Chung Lee Ming, Liu Sem Nyan, Chung Kwi Xheng, Lee Shie Yen and Liu Daou Nyan.

=== Chinese Tannery Owners Association of India ===
Lee leased the land and built the Chinese Tannery Owners Association. This association's initiatives included:

- Centralizing a tanner market for owners to benefit in the procurement sourcing of the highest market price for finished leather. The tannery owners contributed to the immense wealth of the West Bengal government in producing leather and leather products for export.
- Introducing recycling by reducing and recycling the collective byproduct wastage of hide shavings by curing it and selling it for profit. The community benefited from this recycling scheme.

=== Overseas Chinese Commerce Journal ===
He allocated space for The Overseas Chinese Commerce Association of India within the existing Chinese Tannery Owners Association where he:

- Launched the Overseas Chinese Commerce newspaper, a local Seong Pow news in Chinese. The paper disseminated community announcements and overseas news in 1969.
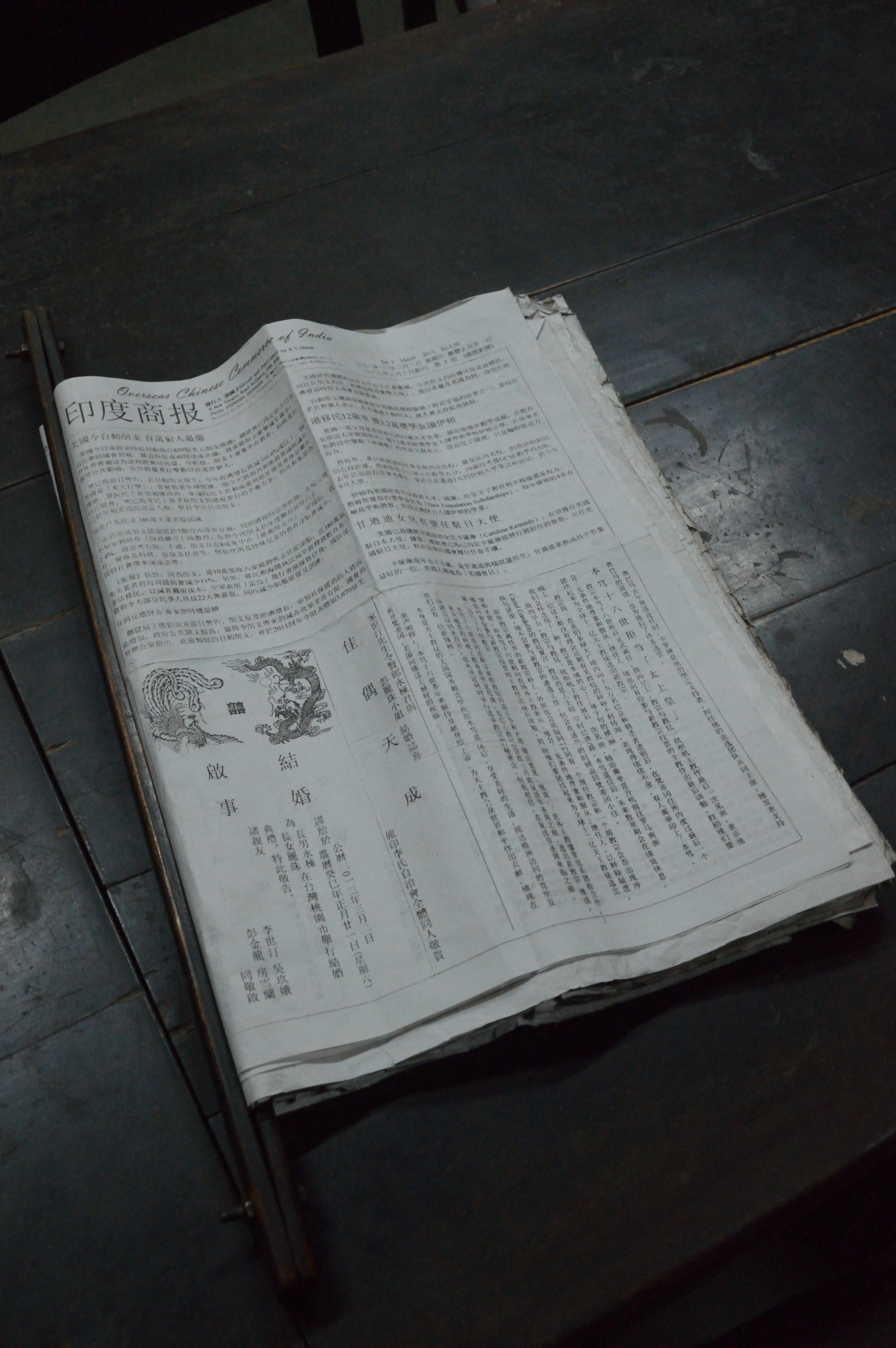
  Founded: The Overseas Chinese Commerce of India (1969). Photo courtesy of Biswarup Ganguly

This newspaper published the local news compared with a pro-Kuomintang newspaper, the Chinese Journal of India, and a few other journals that had existed before his arrival. The Overseas Chinese Commerce of India, or 'Seong Pow' newspaper, survived until its last publication with the death of its last editor, Kuo-Tsai Chang, in 2020.

==== Pei May High School ====
- He leased the land, built, and founded the new Pei May High School for the increasing younger generation. This school became the new grounds for a combined elementary and high school education. It was a Chinese medium school that also taught English. At its peak, the school had over a thousand students, but declined over the years until the school was closed in 2010.

Lee left behind a legacy of distinguished works as the Hakka community leader for over half a century. In his lifetime, the community grew to over 15,000 people.

=== Sino-Indian war repercussion on the community ===
When the Sino-Indian war broke out in 1962, the community went through an upheaval with their civil liberties and freedom violated. Lee, through his English-speaking son, had been helping the community with their application submission and follow-up years before the war broke out. His family and those who possessed Permanent Indian Residency papers were not detained. After the war, the community gathered themselves and set about to find their families and to restore their properties and businesses.

=== Environmental Plan for relocation of the community tanneries ===
Four years after his death, a directive on the community came by the order of the Supreme Court (1995) to relocate the Kolkata tanneries. This caused more of the Chinese community to leave India on their own, while others stayed and converted their tanneries into restaurants. The majority of the community immigrated to Canada.
