= Hakka opera =

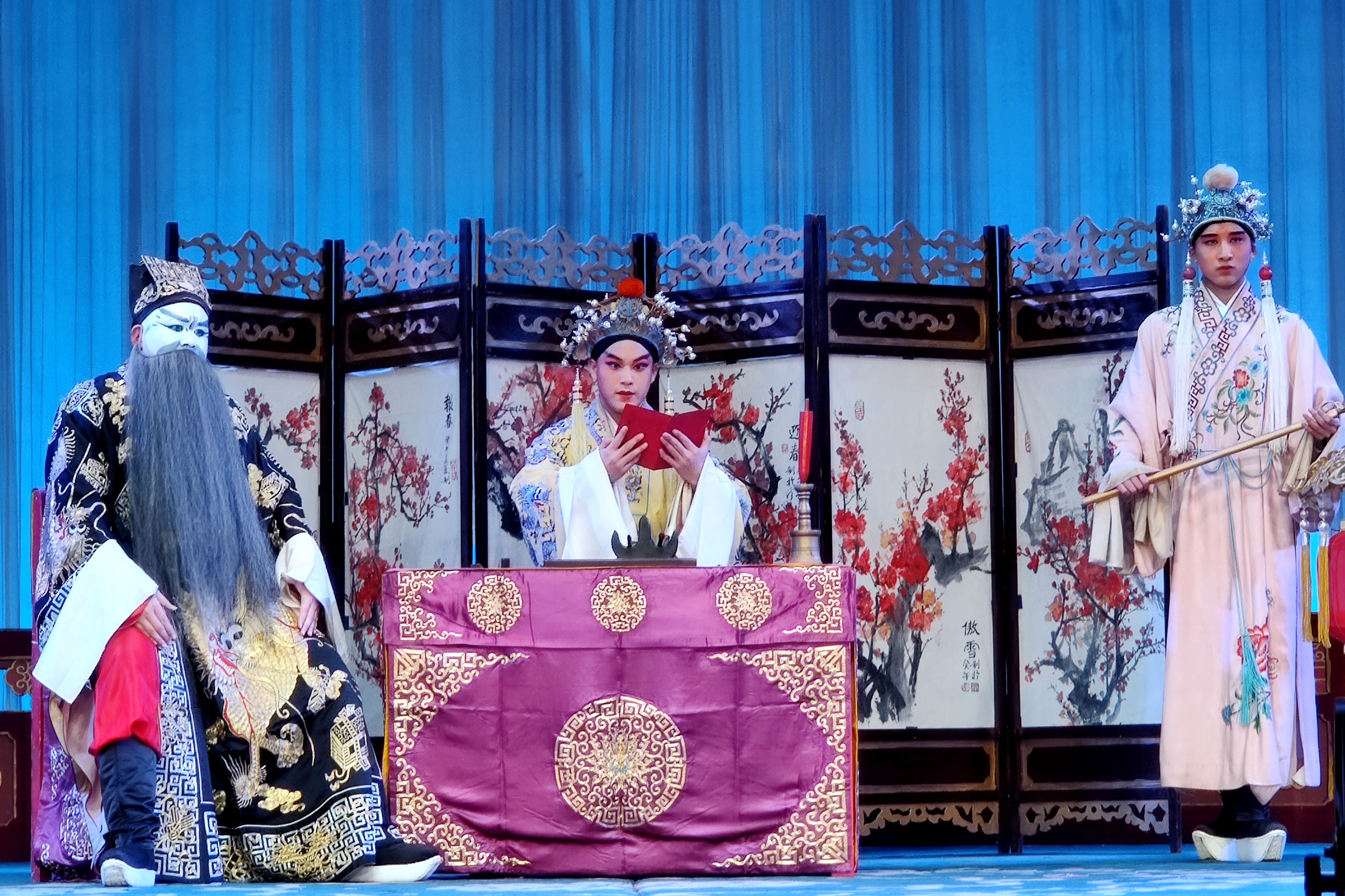

Hakka opera (traditional Chinese: 漢劇; simplified Chinese: 汉剧) also known as Han opera or Waijiang opera, is a variety of Chinese opera originating in eastern Guangdong province, China, during the Qing dynasty. It derives some elements from Peking opera and other Chinese opera styles. An example of a Hakka opera piece is "Baili Xi Recognizes His Wife" (百里奚認妻).
