= Sky Sword I =

- Type: Guided missile
- Place of origin: Taiwan

Service history
- In service: 1980s to present
- Used by: Republic of China Air Force and Republic of China Army

Production history
- Designed: Early 1980s
- Manufacturer: National Chung-Shan Institute of Science and Technology
- Variants: Antelope air defence system and Sea Oryx

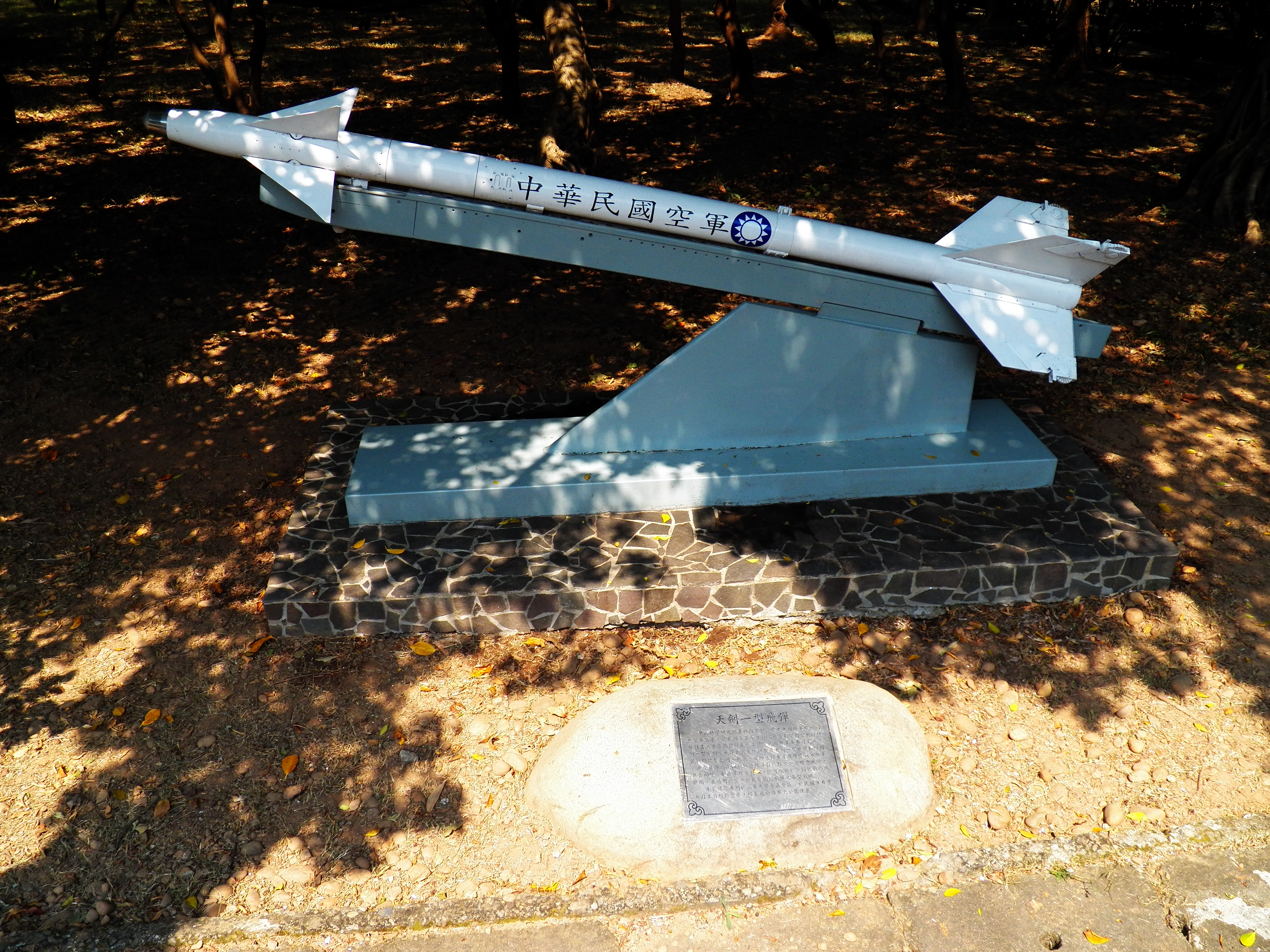
TC-1 Sky Sword I (air-to-air)

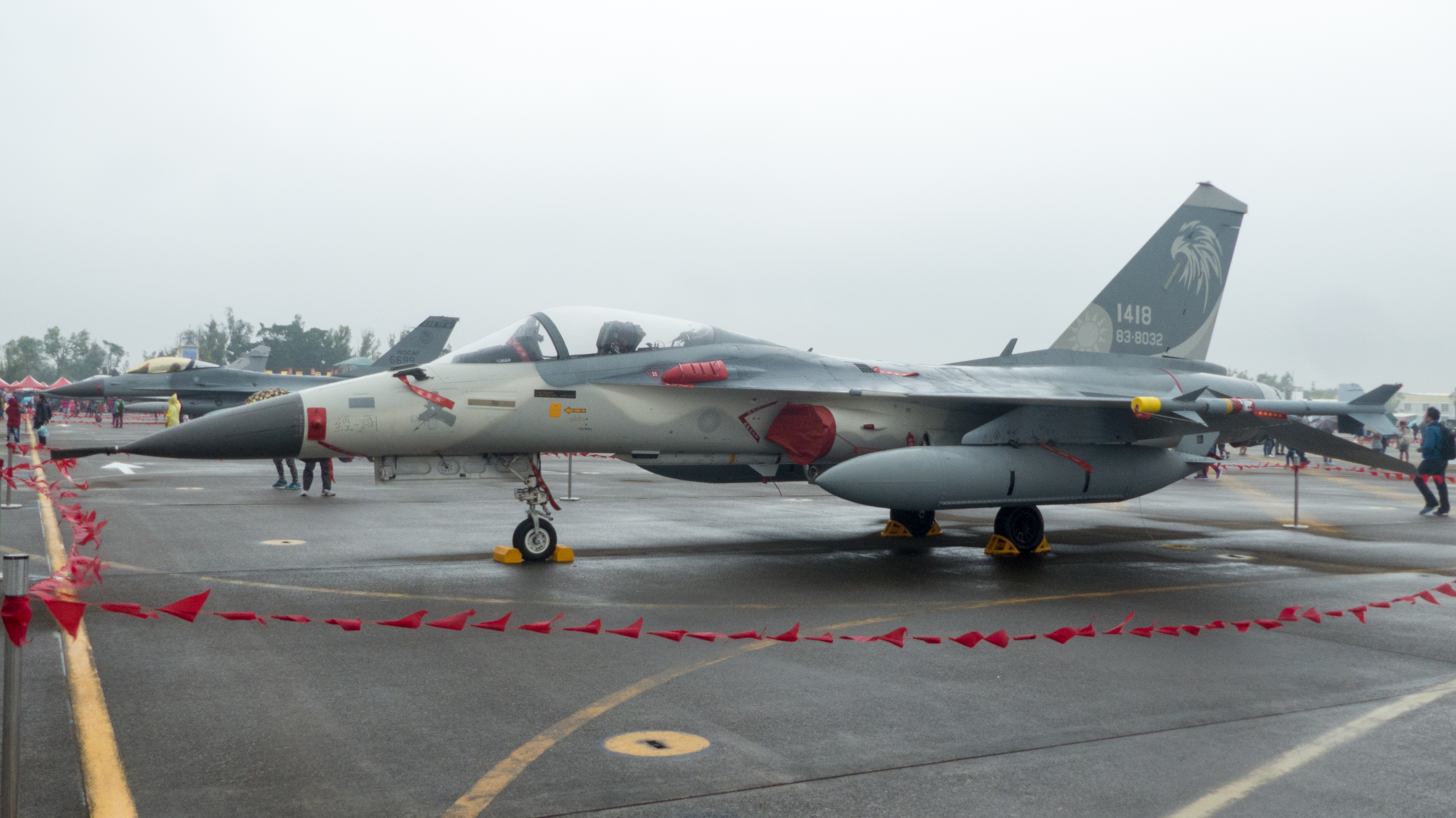
ROCAF F-CK-1A at Ching Chuan Kang Air Base with a TC-1 on the wingtip

The Sky Sword I, Tien Chien I, or TC-1 (Chinese: 天劍一; pinyin: Tiān Jiàn Yī; Wade–Giles: Tʻien^{¹} Chien^{⁴} I^{¹}) is a short range infrared guided air-to-air missile. The missile has fire and forget slave-by-radar capabilities. It consists of an infrared seeker, a high explosive warhead, a solid propellant motor and a guidance control unit. The seeker uses dual spectral IR and has a detection range of 18.5 km. The Sky Sword 1 is also used as a surface-to-air missile by the Antelope air defence system.

== Development ==
The Sky Sword 1 was developed in the mid-1980s and revealed in May 1986, as Taiwan's first indigenous air-to-air missile. The production of the missile started in 1991 and the air-to-air version entered ROCAF service in 1993. It bears a striking similarity to the American AIM-9 (also in Taiwanese service) and fulfills a similar role on the Indigenous Defense Fighter to the AIM-9 on the F-16. In 2017 NCSIST exhibited a variant of the TC-1 with a larger diameter motor.

== Service history ==
TC-1 missiles were employed during a 2019 training exercise off Taiwan’s east coast.

== Variants ==
=== TC-1L ===
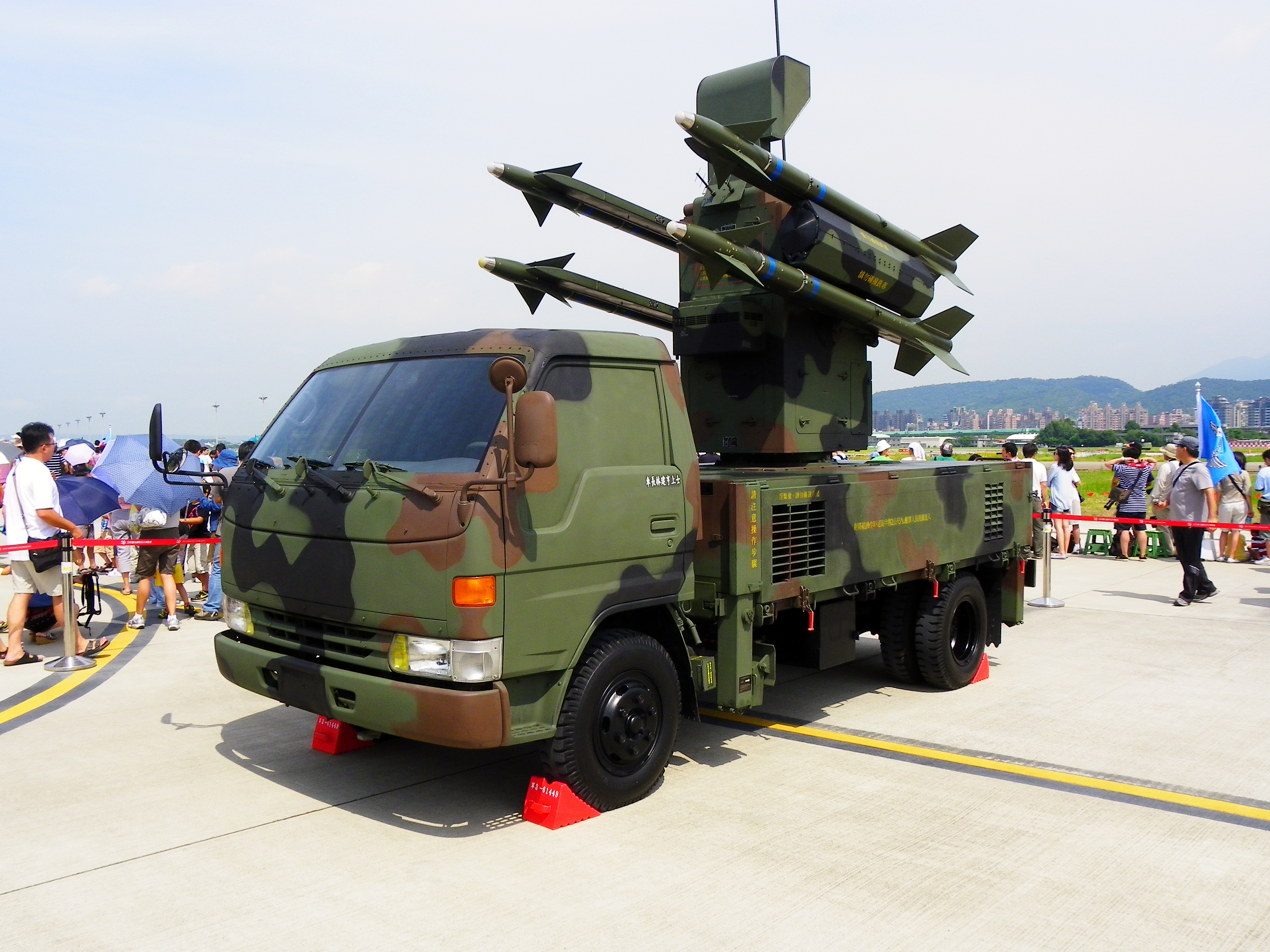
Antelope air defense system

The TC-1L is a ground-launched variant for use with the Antelope air defence system.

=== Sea TC-1 ===
Developed for use with the Sea Oryx system, the Sea TC-1 variant has an improved seeker, data-link, and rocket motor.

== See also ==
- Republic of China Air Force
- Sky Bow
- Sky Sword II

=== Similar weapons ===
- AIM-9 Sidewinder – (United States)
- RIM-116 Rolling Airframe Missile – (United States)
- AAM-3 – (Japan)
- AAM-5 – (Japan)
- R.550 Magic – (France)
- MICA – (France)
- MAA-1 Piranha – (Brazil)
- A-Darter – (South Africa)
- Fatter – (Iran)
- R-73 – (Soviet Union)
- PL-9 – (China)
- Python – (Israel)
