= Antelope air defence system =

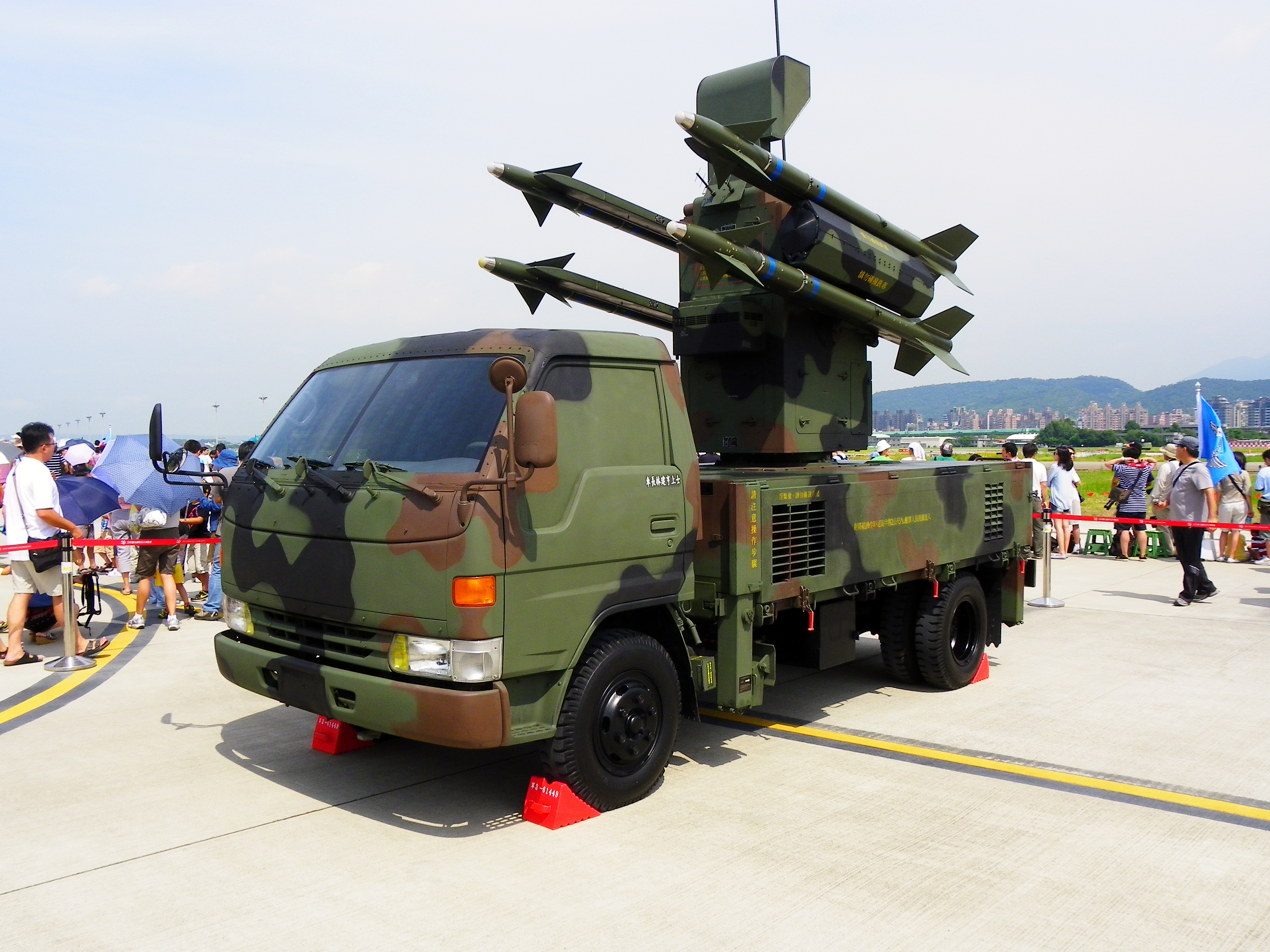
- Type: short range air defense (SHORAD)
- Place of origin: Taiwan

Service history
- Used by: Republic of China (Taiwan) Army

Production history
- Designer: National Chung-Shan Institute of Science and Technology (NCSIST)
- Designed: 1995
- Manufacturer: National Chung-Shan Institute of Science and Technology (NCSIST)
- Produced: In production

Specifications
- Traverse: 360 degrees
- Effective firing range: 9km
- Main armament: TC-1L

The Antelope air defense system (Chinese: 捷羚防空飛彈系統) is a Taiwanese short range ground-to-air anti-aircraft defense system in operation with the Republic of China Army.

== Description ==
The Antelope system employs a battery of four Sky Sword I (TC-1) missiles mounted atop a wheeled vehicle (such as a Toyota Dyna truck, like in the image or humvee). The system can either be employed as a stand-alone point defense system or as part of an integrated area air defense system.

The Antelope system collectively includes targeting, guidance, communications components as well as the missiles themselves. It was developed beginning in 1995 as an outgrowth of the Tien Chien-I missile development program. The precise operating range of the Antelope system is variously reported as 9 km, 18 km, and "4 miles". The system has a crew of two, one gunner and one observer. The system can be controlled from the truck's cabin or from a mobile control console that can be located up to 70m away from the vehicle to increase operator safety and survivability.

The Antelope system's TC-1L interceptors employ infrared guidance and the system is similar in design to the United States-made Chaparral system which historically was a mainstay of Taiwan's SHORAD network. It can be used to intercept low-flying helicopters, fighter aircraft, attack aircraft, and bombers. The system can engage targets on the move.

=== CS/MPQ-78 radar ===
The system's CS/MPQ-78 radar was developed in the early 1990s and is a 3D pulse doppler radar with full look down-shoot down capability. Max radar range is 46.3km and ceiling is 30,480m.

== See also ==
- Sea Oryx – (Taiwan)
- Sky Bow – (Taiwan)
- HQ-7 – (China)
- HQ-10 – (China)
- Azarakhsh - (Iran)
- Multi-Mission Launcher – (United States)
