= USS Dukes County =

World War II tank landing ship

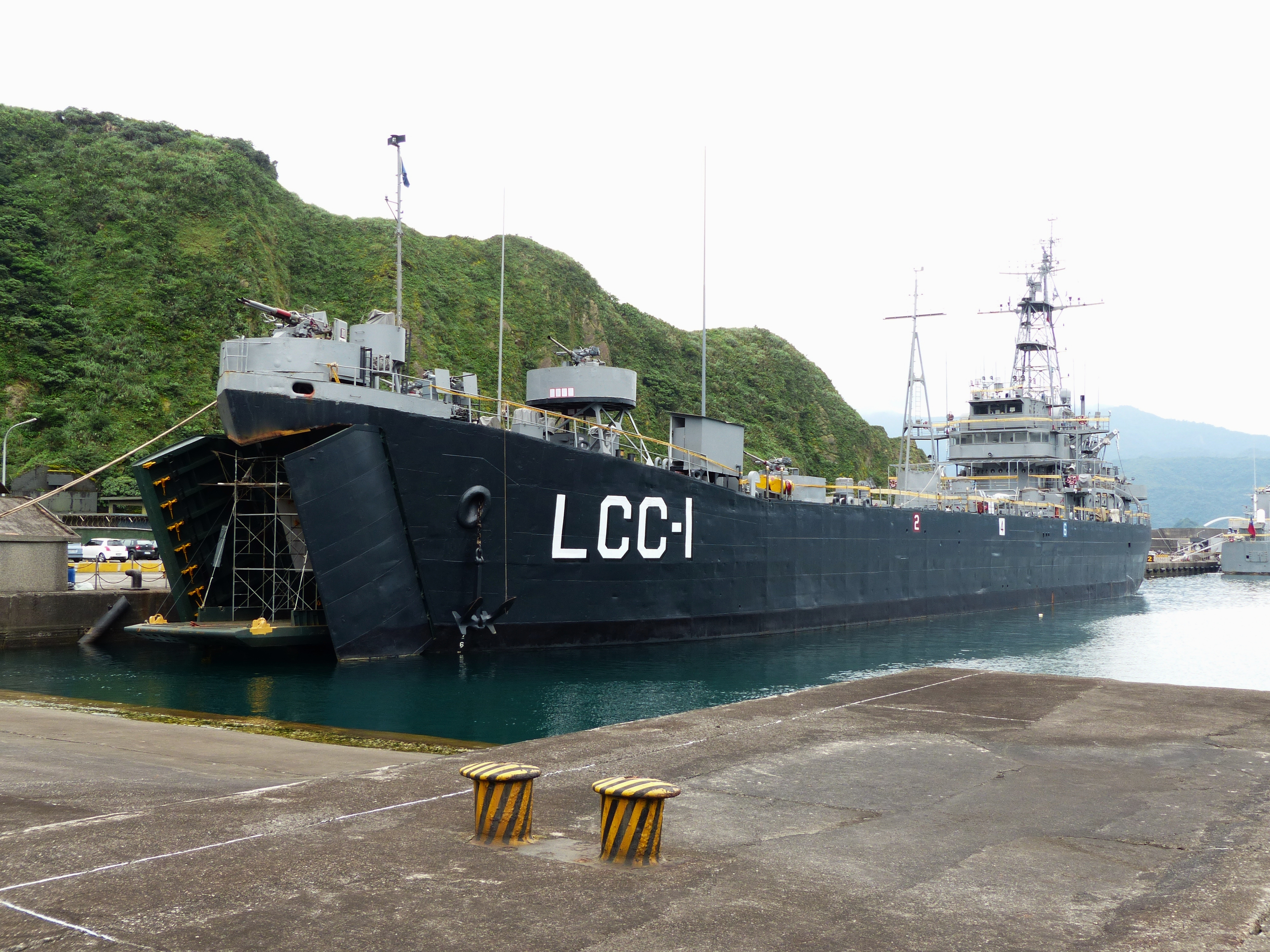
- ROCS Kao Hsiung in 2013

History

United States
- Name: LST-735
- Builder: Dravo Corporation, Neville Island
- Laid down: 30 January 1944
- Launched: 11 March 1944
- Sponsored by: Mrs. G. W. Fearnside
- Commissioned: 26 April 1944
- Decommissioned: March 1946
- Recommissioned: 3 November 1950
- Renamed: Dukes County, 1 July 1955
- Namesake: Dukes County
- Decommissioned: 1957
- Stricken: 1 November 1974
- Identification: Callsign: NGCY; Hull number: LST-735
- Fate: Transferred to the Republic of China, May 1957

History

Taiwan
- Name: Chung Hsi; (中熙)
- Acquired: May 1957
- Commissioned: May 1957
- Renamed: Kao Hsiung
- Namesake: Kao Hsiung
- Decommissioned: 25 February 2026
- Reclassified: LCC-1, 1968
- Identification: Hull number: AGC-1
- Status: Decommissioned

General characteristics
- Class & type: LST-542-class tank landing ship
- Displacement: 1,780 long tons (1,809 t) light; 3,640 long tons (3,698 t) full
- Length: 328 ft (100 m)
- Beam: 50 ft (15 m)
- Draft: 8 ft (2.4 m) forward; 14 ft 4 in (4.37 m) aft
- Propulsion: 2 × General Motors 12-567 diesel engines, two shafts
- Speed: 12 knots (22 km/h; 14 mph)
- Troops: Approximately 140 officers and enlisted men
- Complement: 8-10 officers, 100-115 enlisted men
- Armament: 1 x Mark 41 VLS (8 cells); 1 × single 3"/50 caliber gun mount; 8 × 40 mm guns; 12 × 20 mm guns

USS Dukes County (LST-735) was an LST-542-class tank landing ship built for the United States Navy during World War II. Named after Dukes County, Massachusetts, she was the only U.S. Naval vessel to bear the name. In 1957 she was decommissioned and leased to the Republic of China. In 1962 she was commissioned into Republic of China Navy service.

== Construction and career ==
LST-735 was laid down on 30 January 1944 at Pittsburgh, Pennsylvania by the Dravo Corporation of Neville Island; launched on 11 March 1944; sponsored by Mrs. G. W. Fearnside; and commissioned on 26 April 1944 at New Orleans, Louisiana.

=== Service in the United States Navy ===
During World War II, LST-735 was assigned to the Asiatic-Pacific theater and participated in the following operations: capture and occupation of Saipan (August 1944); Lingayen Gulf landing (January 1945); Zambales-Subic Bay (January 1945); and the assault and occupation of Okinawa Gunto (March through June 1945).

LST-735 was decommissioned in March 1946 and reactivated on 3 November 1950 when she performed service during the Korean War and after with Commander Mine Forces, Pacific. Assigned as a minesweeper support ship in July 1951, she made a Korean War deployment in 1952-53 and had additional Western Pacific tours in 1953-54 and 1955–56. Renamed USS Dukes County (LST-735) 1 July 1955.

LST-735 earned four battle stars for World War II service and three for Korean service.

=== Service in the Republic of China Navy ===
The ship was subsequently decommissioned (date unknown) and leased to the Republic of China (Taiwan) in May 1957 and again renamed Chung Hsi (LST-219). She was outfitted in January 1962 as an amphibious command ship and renamed Kao Hsiung (AGC-1, later LCC-1). Struck from the Naval Vessel Register on 1 November 1974, she was sold to Taiwan.

Kao Hsiung later underwent refurbishment along with the rest of the ROCN's fleet of tank landing ships and is still serving with the ROC Navy and was visited in March 2012 by Fleet Master Chief John Minyard of Pacific Fleet Command. He reported that she is in outstanding condition and is battle ready.

In 2016 she was selected to host as Mark 41 Vertical Launching System test bed for Taiwan.

In November 2019 it was reported that she had been decommissioned and was being used as a test ship for the Hsun Lien naval combat system project and had been fitted with a large phased array radar system and the Mark 41 Vertical Launching System.

In 2021 the vessel was fitted with the Sea Oryx missile system.

The ship was decommissioned on 25 February 2026, after over 80 years of service.

== Gallery ==
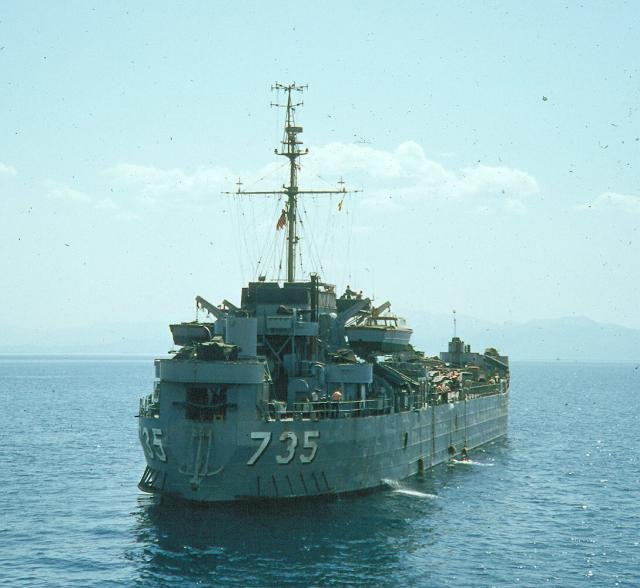
LST-735 off Wonsan, Korea c. 1953

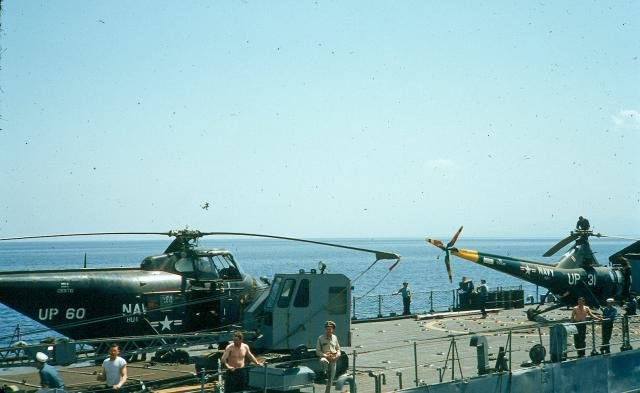
LST-735 off Wonsan, Korea c. 1953 with a Sikorsky H-19 "Chickasaw" helicopter (left) and a Sikorsky H-5 (right)

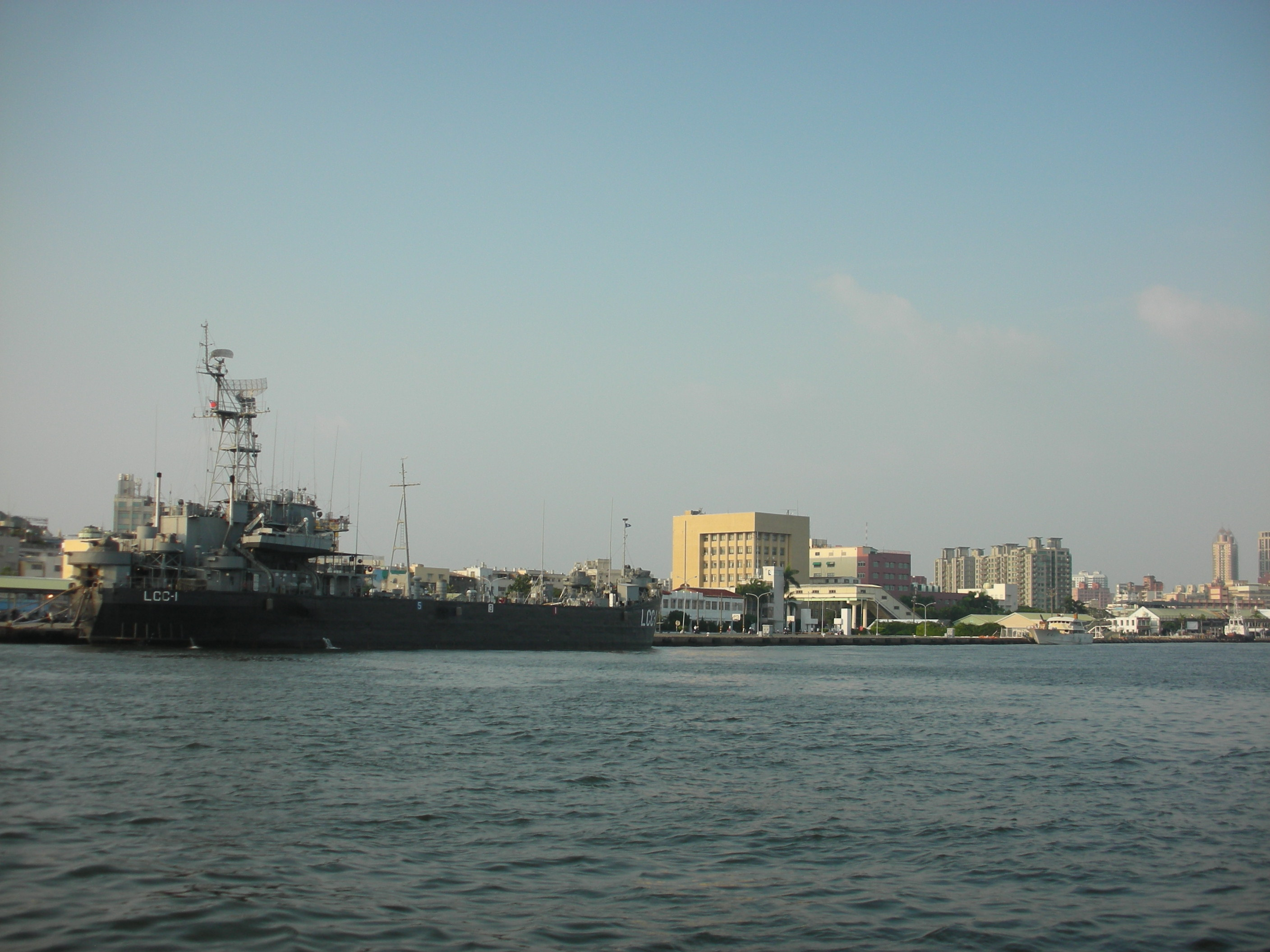
Kao Hsiung on 28 June 2012

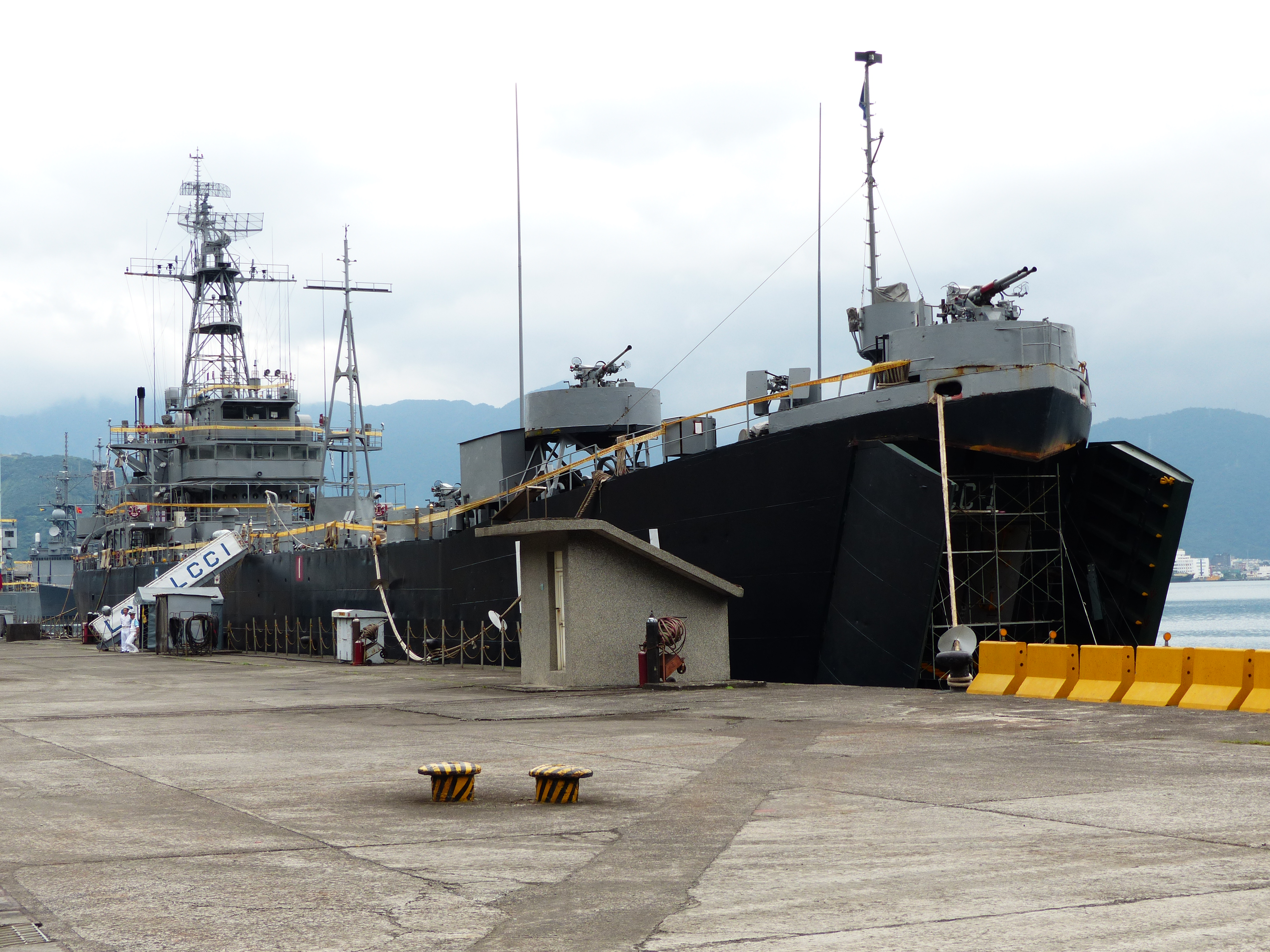
Kao Hsiung on 4 May 2013

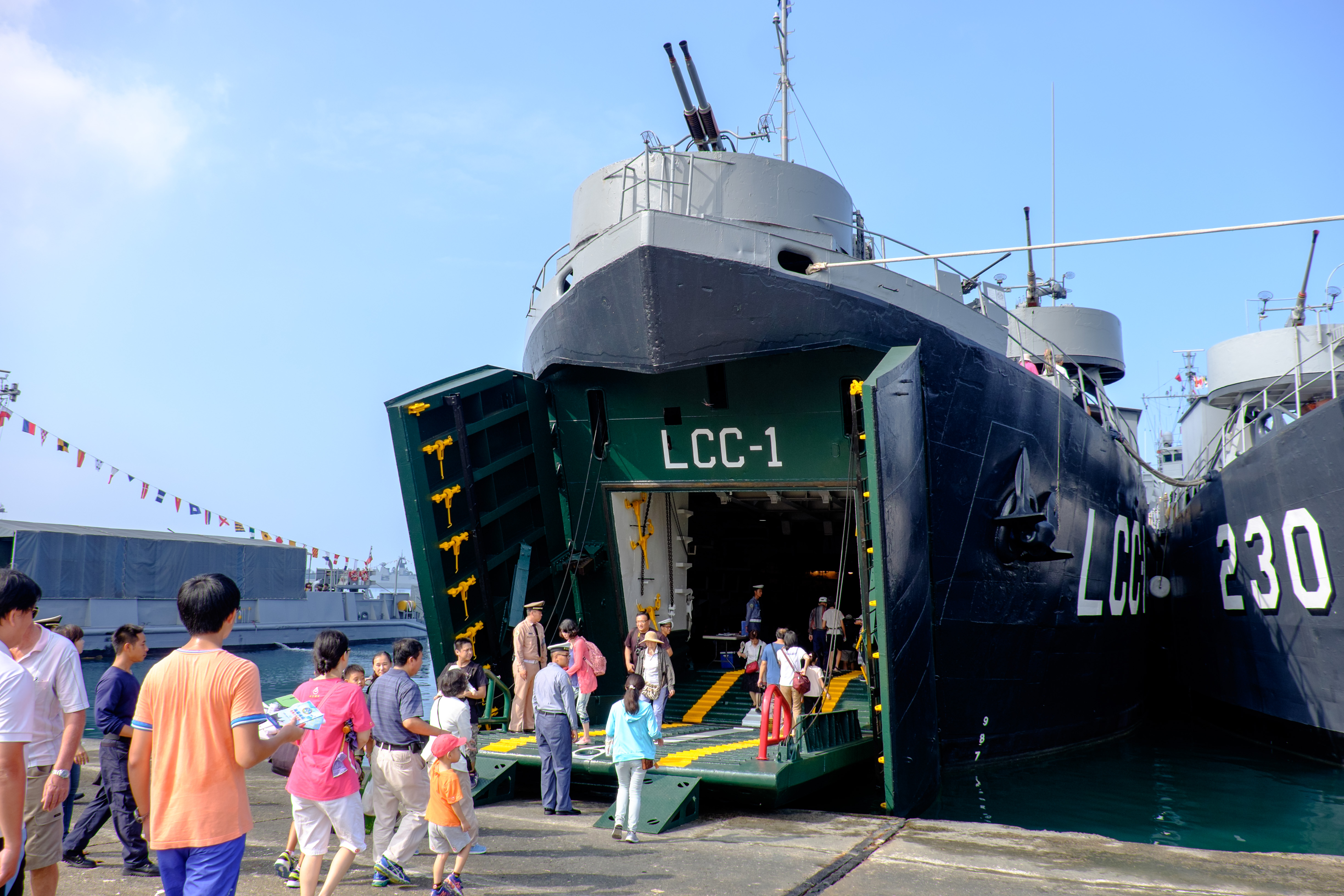
Kao Hsiung on 24 October 2015
