= Sea Oryx =

Taiwanese air defense system

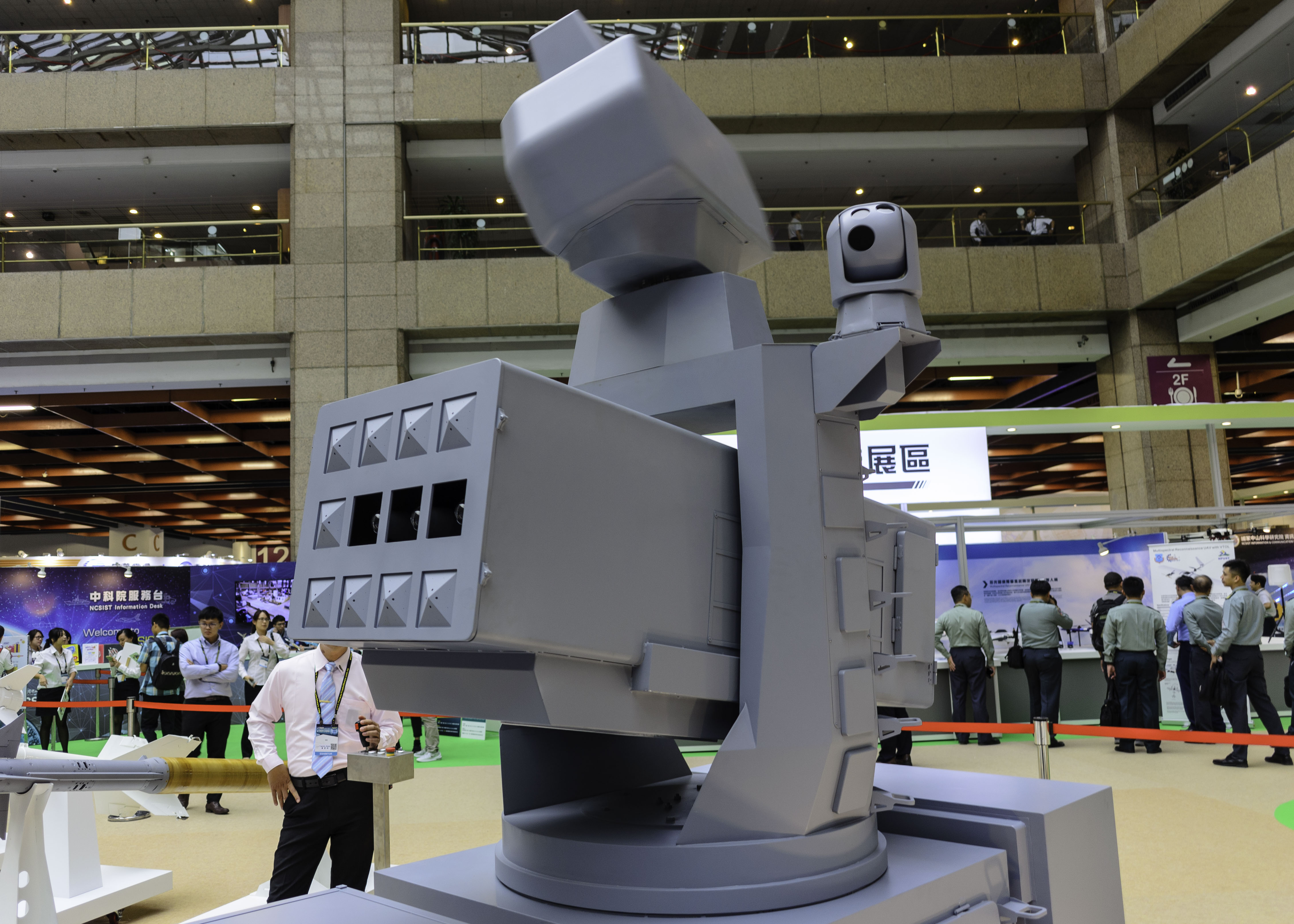
- Sea Oryx missile launcher model
- Type: SAM based CIWS
- Place of origin: Taiwan

Service history
- Used by: Taiwan

The Sea Oryx (Chinese: 海劍羚飛彈系統; pinyin: Hǎi jiàn líng fēidàn xìtǒng) is a lightweight, infrared homing short-range air defense system developed for the Republic of China (Taiwan) Navy. Based on the TC-1L surface-to-air missile, it is designed to defend against anti-ship missiles, helicopters, and low flying fixed-wing jet airplanes. It is reported to be a copy of the American/German RIM-116 Rolling Airframe Missile and uses components of the Sky Sword I air-to-air missile.

== Development ==
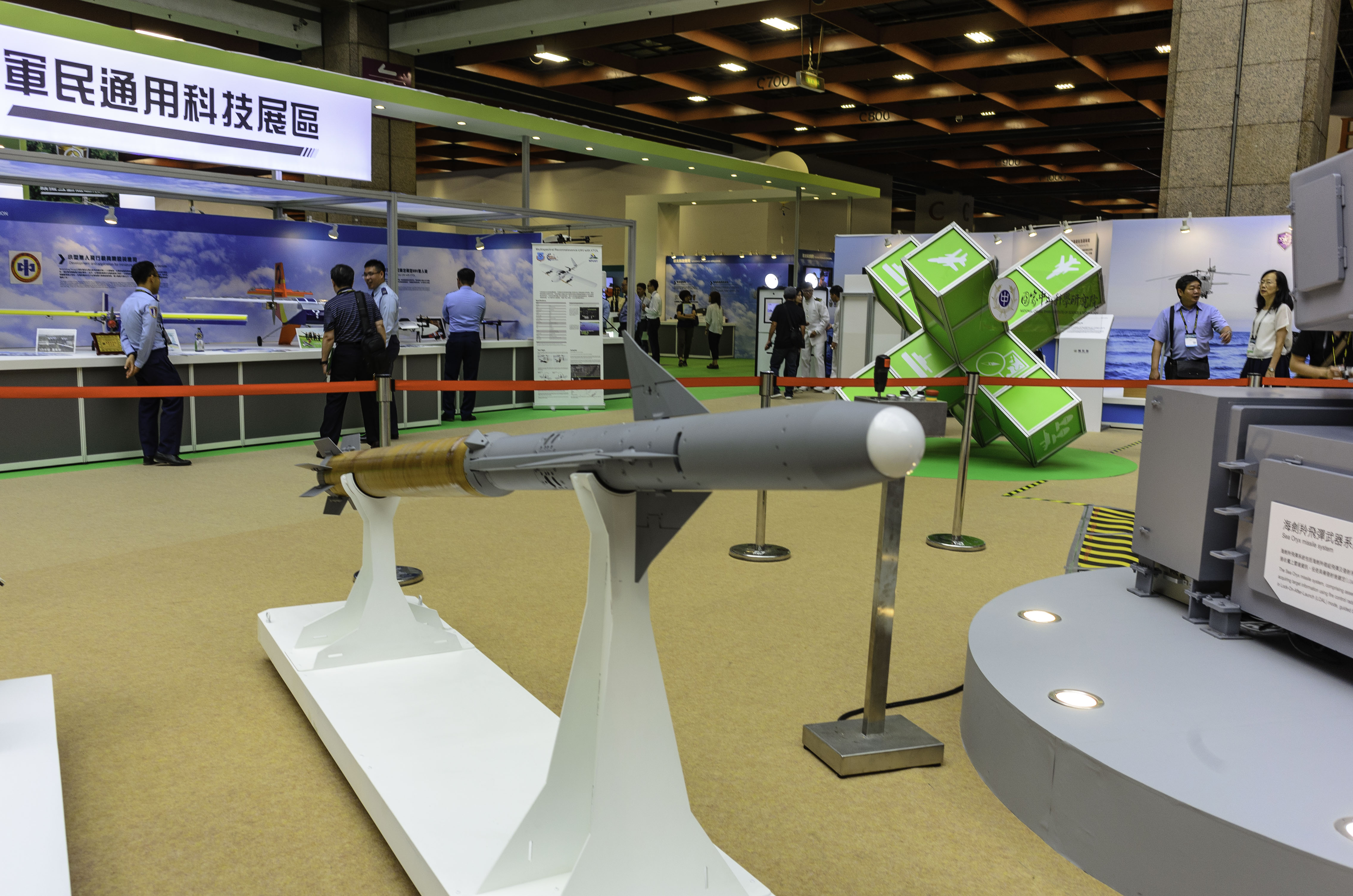
Sea Oryx Missile Display at MND Hall in 2019

A concept model was displayed in 2015 as a TC-1 modified with an imaging infrared seeker, folding control surfaces, free-rolling tailfins, a more-powerful rocket motor, and a trainable launcher with either eight or sixteen all up rounds and a FLIR sensor on its left-hand side.

The design was finalized in 2017, which saw the missile's aft section enlarged in diameter to accommodate more rocket fuel and its four rolling tailfins replaced with eight smaller, fixed ones. The launchers have also evolved into two more-distinct variants: one that is integrated into the ship's central combat management system (as well as being completely reliant on it for targeting information) and has a capacity of 24 missiles but no onboard sensors, and an "autonomous" version that houses only twelve missiles but has its own rotating search/tracking radar and FLIR/Electro-Optical sensor, along the same concept as the SeaRAM system.

In 2021 a Sea Oryx system was tested aboard the test ship ROCS Kao Hsiung.

== Variants ==
=== Land based ===
During the 2019 Taipei Aerospace & Defense Technology Exhibition, NCSIST presented a concept video showing the Sea Oryx system mounted on a truck defending Taiwan's AN/FPS-115 PAVE PAWS early warning radar against a Chinese cruise missile attack.

== See also ==
- RIM-116 Rolling Airframe Missile
- FL-3000N
- Sea Wolf missile
- Umkhonto missile
- Antelope air defence system
