= RIM-116 Rolling Airframe Missile =

American surface-to-air missile

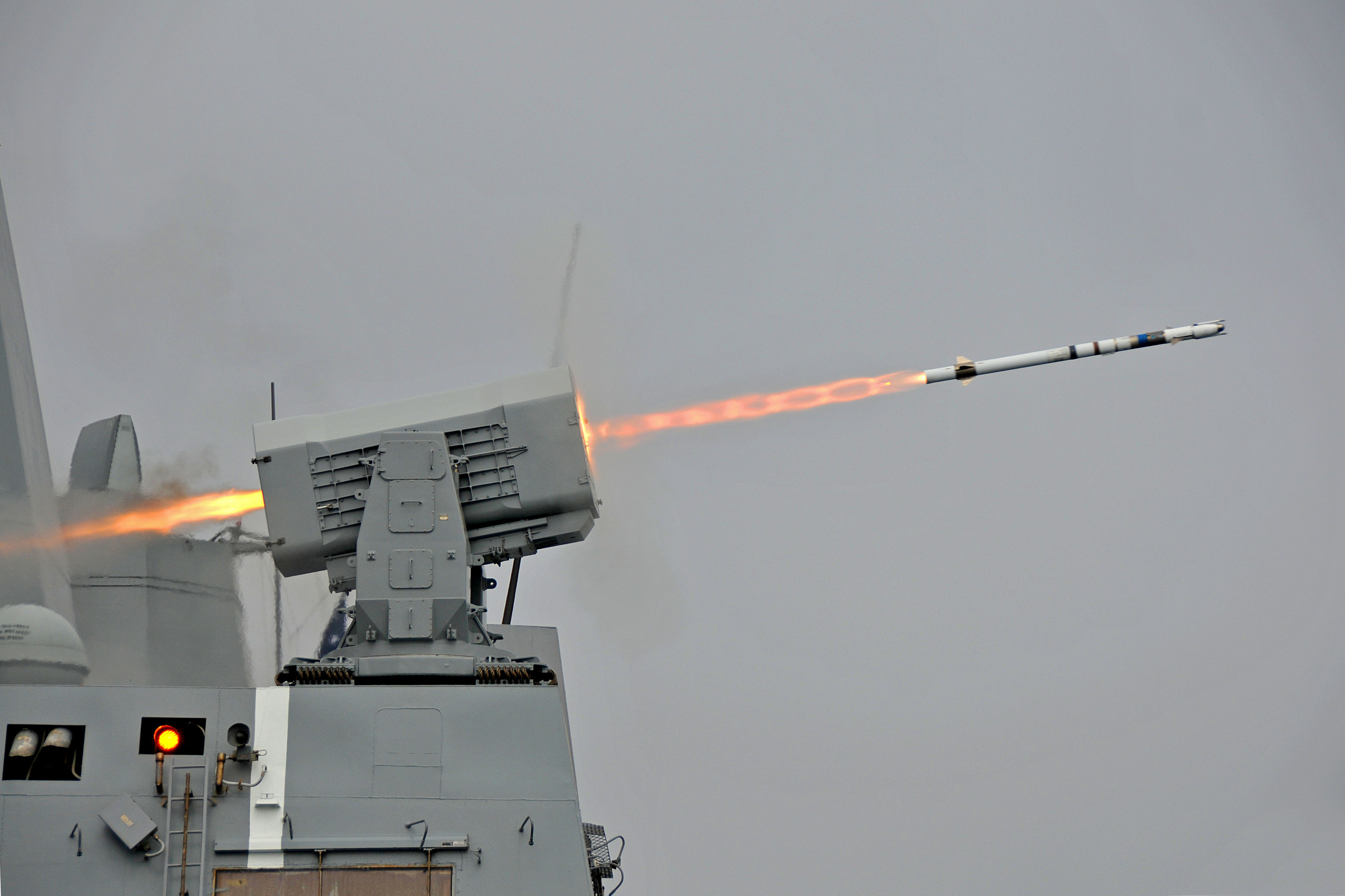
- A RIM-116 being launched from USS New Orleans in 2013
- Type: SAM-based CIWS
- Place of origin: Germany and United States

Service history
- In service: 1992–present
- Used by: § Operators

Production history
- Designer: General Dynamics (now Raytheon) and Diehl BGT Defence
- Designed: 1976
- Manufacturer: General Dynamics (now Raytheon) and Diehl Defence
- Unit cost: US$998,000 (FY2014); US$905,330 (FY2021) (average)
- Produced: 1985–present
- Variants: § Variants

Specifications
- Mass: 5,777 kg (12,736 lb) (launcher); 73.5 kilograms (162 lb 1 oz) (missile)
- Length: 2.79 m (9 ft 2 in) (missile)
- Diameter: 127 mm (5 in) (Block 1 missile); 159 mm (6.25 in) (Block 2 missile)
- Wingspan: 434 mm (17.1 in)
- Warhead: Blast fragmentation warhead
- Warhead weight: 11.3 kg (24 lb 15 oz)
- Engine: Hercules/Bermite Mk. 36 solid-fuel rocket
- Propellant: Solid
- Operational range: 9 km (5.6 mi)
- Maximum speed: In excess of Mach 2 (1,500 mph; 2,500 km/h)
- Guidance system: Three modes: passive radio frequency/infrared homing, infrared only, or; infrared dual mode enabled (radio frequency and infrared homing)
- Accuracy: Over 95%
- Launch platform: Mk 144 Guided Missile Launcher (GML) of the Mk 49 Guided Missile Launching System (GMLS)

The RIM-116 Rolling Airframe Missile (RAM) is a small, lightweight, infrared homing surface-to-air missile in use by the German, Japanese, Greek, Turkish, South Korean, Saudi Arabian, Egyptian, Mexican, UAE, and United States navies. It was originally intended and used primarily as a point-defense weapon against anti-ship missiles. As its name indicates, the RAM rolls as it flies. The missile's radio-frequency tracking system uses a two-antenna interferometer that can measure phase interference of electromagnetic waves in one plane only; constant rolling allows the missile to scan in all directions. The rolling means only one pair of steering canards is required. As of 2005, it is the only U.S. Navy missile to operate in this manner.

The Rolling Airframe Missiles, together with the Mark 49 Guided Missile Launching System (GMLS) and support equipment, make up the RAM Mk 31 Guided Missile Weapon System (GMWS). The Mk-144 Guided Missile Launcher (GML) unit weighs 5,777 kilograms (12,736 lb) and stores 21 missiles. The original weapon cannot employ its own sensors prior to firing, so it must be integrated with a ship's combat system, which directs the launcher at targets. On U.S. ships, it is integrated with the AN/SWY-2 Ship Defense Surface Missile System (SDSMS) and Ship Self-Defense System (SSDS) Mk 1 or Mk 2-based combat systems. SeaRAM, a launcher variant equipped with independent sensors derived from the Vulcan Phalanx CIWS, is being installed on Independence-class littoral combat ships and certain Arleigh Burke-class destroyers.

== Development ==
The RIM-116 was developed by General Dynamics's Pomona and Valley Systems divisions under a July 1976 agreement with Denmark and West Germany (the General Dynamics missile business was later acquired by Hughes Aircraft and is today part of Raytheon). Denmark dropped out of the program, but the U.S. Navy joined in as the major partner. The Mk 49 launcher was evaluated on board the destroyer USS David R. Ray in the late 1980s. The first 30 missiles were built in FY85, and they became operational on 14 November 1992, onboard USS Peleliu.

SeaRAM was developed in response to concerns about the performance of gun-based systems against modern supersonic sea-skimming anti-ship missiles. It was designed as a companion self-defense system to Phalanx.

== Service ==
The RIM-116 is in service on several American and 30 German warships. All newly laid German Navy warships will be equipped with the RAM, such as the modern Braunschweig-class corvettes, which mount two RAM launchers per ship. The Greek Navy has equipped the new Super Vita fast attack craft (also known as the Roussen-class) and the FDI frigates with the RAM. South Korea has signed license-production contracts for their navy's KDX-II, KDX-III, and Dokdo-class amphibious assault ships.

=== U.S. Navy ===
The U.S. Navy plans to purchase a total of about 1,600 RAMs and 115 launchers to equip 74 ships. The missile is currently active aboard Gerald R. Ford-class aircraft carriers, Nimitz-class aircraft carriers, Wasp-class amphibious assault ships, America-class amphibious assault ships, San Antonio-class amphibious transport dock ships, Whidbey Island-class dock landing ships, Harpers Ferry-class dock landing ships, and Freedom-class littoral combat ships (LCS).

== Variants ==
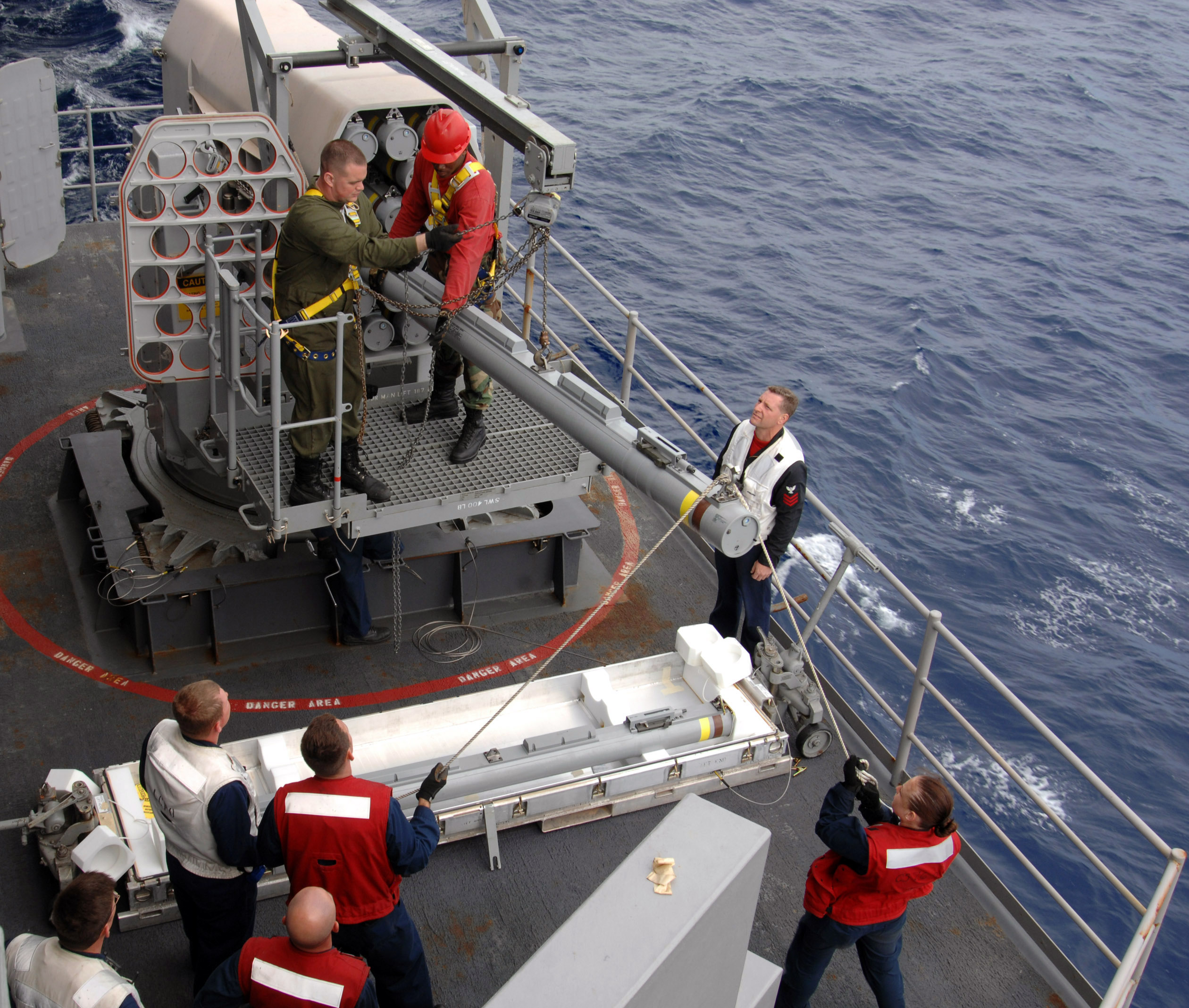
Sailors handle the rolling airframe missile system aboard the Nimitz-class aircraft carrier USS Harry S. Truman.

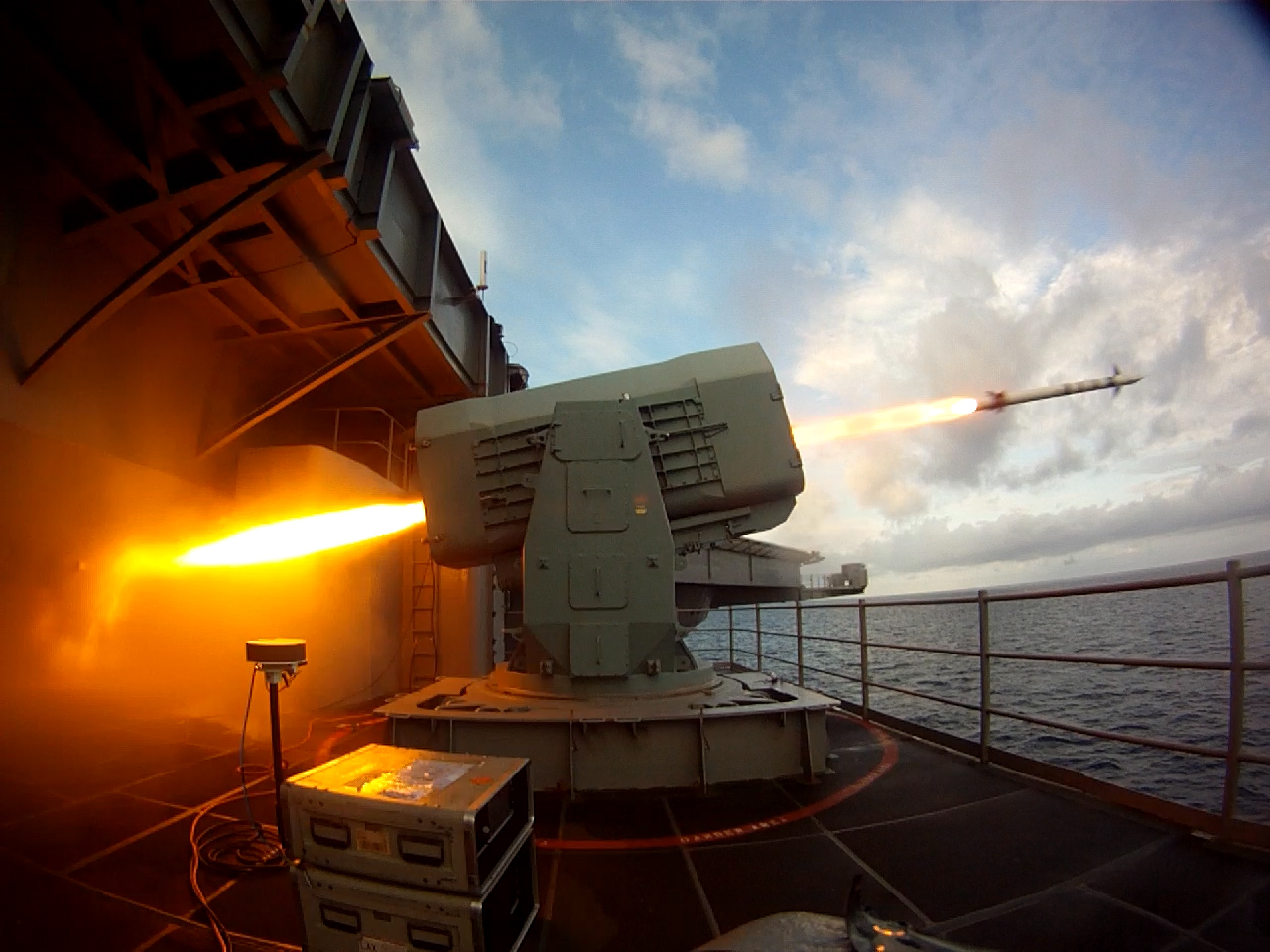
The aircraft carrier USS Theodore Roosevelt launches a Rolling Airframe Missile (RAM).

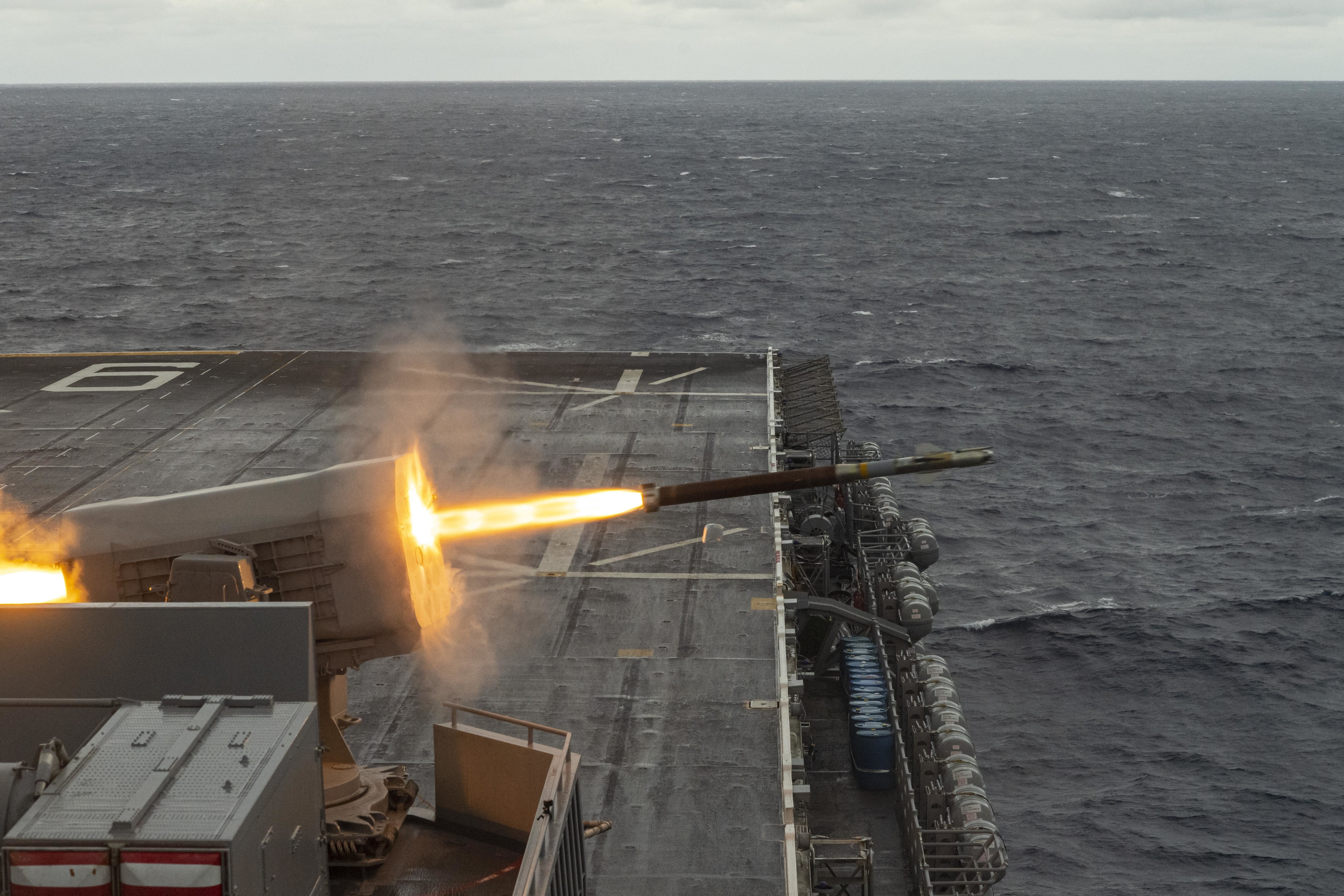
USS America (LHA 6) launching a RIM-116C Rolling Airframe Missile Block 2

=== Block 0 ===
The original version of the missile, called Block 0, is based on the AIM-9 Sidewinder air-to-air missile, whose rocket motor, fuze, and warhead are used. Block 0 missiles were designed to initially home in on radiation emitted from a target (such as the active radar of an incoming anti-ship missile), switching to an infrared seeker derived from that of the FIM-92 Stinger missile for terminal guidance. In test firings, the Block 0 missiles achieved hit rates of over 95%.

=== Block 1 ===
The Block 1 (RIM-116B) is an improved version of the RAM missile that adds an overall infrared-only guidance system that enables it to intercept missiles that are not emitting any radar signals. The Block 0's radar homing capabilities have been retained.

=== Block 2 ===
The Block 2 (RIM-116C) is an upgraded version of the RAM missile aimed at more effectively countering more maneuverable anti-ship missiles through a four-axis independent control actuator system, increased rocket motor capability to 15.8 cm (6.25–inch) diameter, an improved passive radio frequency seeker and upgraded components of the infrared seeker, and advanced kinematics. On 8 May 2007, the U.S. Navy awarded Raytheon Missile Systems a $105 million development contract. Development was expected to be completed by December 2010. LRIP began in 2012.

Fifty-one missiles were initially ordered. On 22 October 2012, the RAM Block 2 completed its third guided test vehicle flight, firing two missiles in a salvo and directly hitting the target, to verify the system's command and control capabilities, kinematic performance, guidance system, and airframe capabilities. Raytheon was scheduled to deliver 25 Block 2 missiles during the program's integrated testing phase. The Block 2 RAM was delivered to the U.S. Navy in August 2014, with 502 missiles to be acquired from 2015 to 2019. Initial Operational Capability (IOC) for the Block 2 RAM was achieved on 15 May 2015.

In early 2018 the U.S. State Department approved the sale of RIM-116 Block II to the Mexican Navy for use on their future Sigma-class design frigates, the first of which was jointly built by Damen Schelde Naval Shipbuilding and launched in November 2018.

=== Block 2B ===
At the IndoPacific 2025 Convention in Sydney, in interview with Naval News a Raytheon Australia representative declared the Block 2B was operational and on offer to the Royal Australian Navy as part of the Enhanced Mogami Build. In the same interview the Raytheon Australia representative gave the publicly disclosed range of the Block 2B as 10 Nautical Miles.

=== HAS mode ===
In 1998, a memorandum of understanding was signed by the defense departments of Germany and the United States to improve the system so that it could also engage so-called "HAS", Helicopter, Aircraft, and Surface targets. As developed, the HAS upgrade just required software modifications that can be applied to all Block 1 RAM missiles.

=== SeaRAM ===
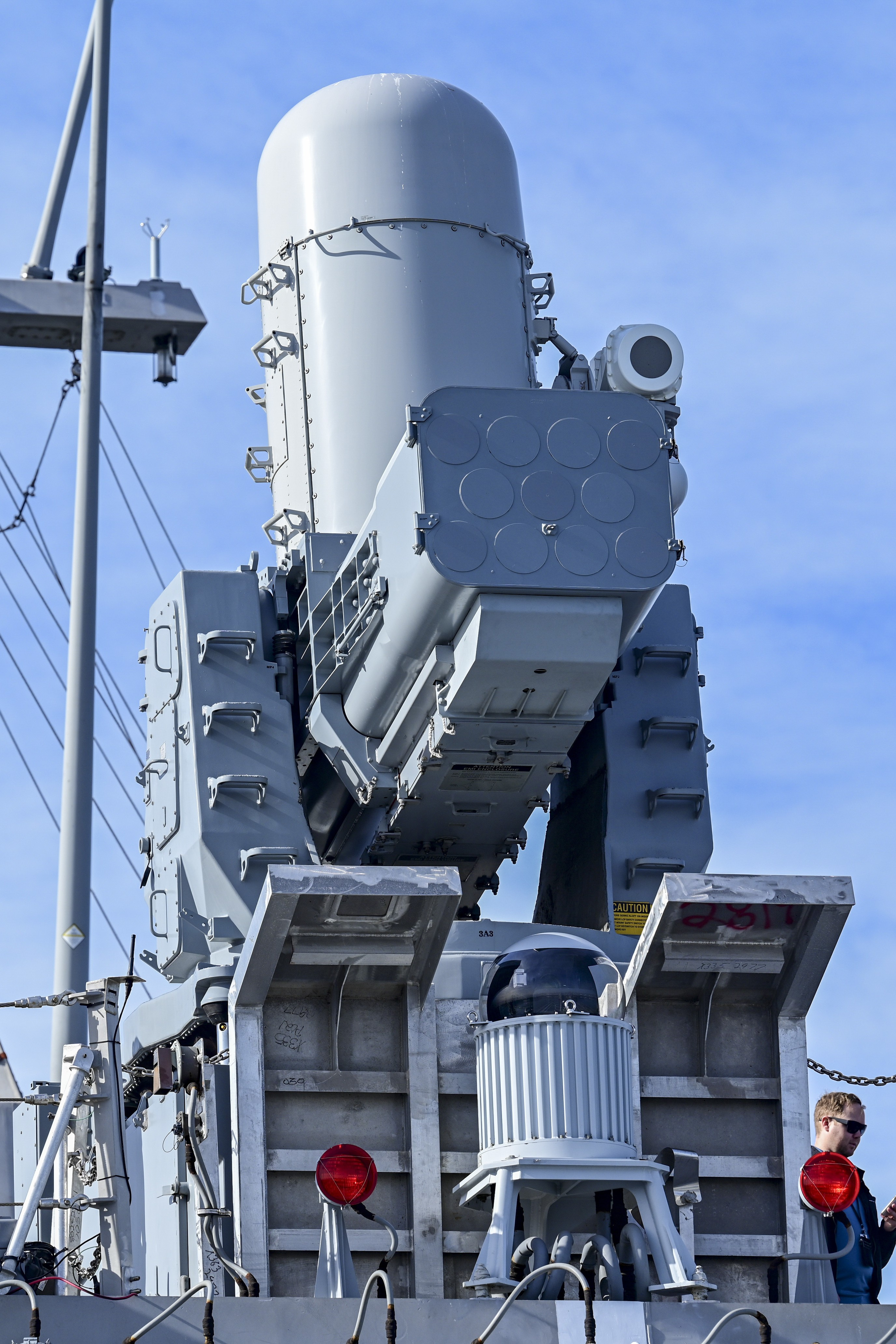
SeaRAM on USS Canberra (LCS 30)

The SeaRAM weapon system combines the radar and electro-optical system of the Phalanx CIWS Mk-15 Block 1B (CRDC) with an 11-cell RAM launcher to produce an autonomous system—one which does not need any external information to engage threats. Like the Phalanx, SeaRAM can be fitted to any class of ship. Due to the common mounting, SeaRAM inherits the relatively easy installation characteristics of its gun-based sibling, with Raytheon stating that SeaRAM "fits the exact shipboard installation footprint of the Phalanx, uses the same power and requires minimal shipboard modification". In 2008, the first SeaRAM system was delivered to be installed on USS Independence.

As of December 2013, one SeaRAM is fitted to each Independence-class vessel. In late 2014, the Navy revealed it had chosen to install the SeaRAM on its Small Surface Combatant LCS follow-on ships. Beginning in November 2015, the Navy completed installation of a SeaRAM on the first of four Arleigh Burke-class destroyers patrolling within the U.S. 6th Fleet. The SeaRAM will equip the Royal Saudi Navy's multi-mission surface combat (MMSC) based on the Freedom-class littoral combat ships.

== General characteristics ==
Primary function: Surface-to-air missile
Contractor: Raytheon, Diehl BGT Defence

Block 1

- Length: 2.79 m (9 ft 2 in)
- Diameter: 127 mm (5.0 in)
- Fin span: 434 mm (1 ft 5.1 in)
- Speed: Mach 2.0+
- Warhead: 11.3 kg (24.9 lb) blast fragmentation with 7.9 lb (3.6 kg) High-Explosive
- Launch weight: 73.5 kg (162 lb)
- Range: 10 km (6.2 mi)
- Guidance system: three modes—passive radio frequency/infrared homing, infrared only, or infrared dual-mode enabled (radio frequency and infrared homing)
- Unit cost: $998,000
- Date deployed: 1992

Block 1A

- Length: 9.3 ft (2.83 m)
- Diameter: 5 in (12.70 cm)
- Wingspan: 17.5 in (44.45 cm)
- Weight: 164 lb (74.4 kg)
- Date deployed: August 1999

Block 2

- Length: 9.45 ft (2.88 m)
- Diameter: 6.25 in (15.88 cm)
- Wingspan: 12.65 in (32.13 cm)
- Weight: 194.4 lb (88.2 kg)
- Date deployed: May 2015

== Operators ==
=== Current operators ===
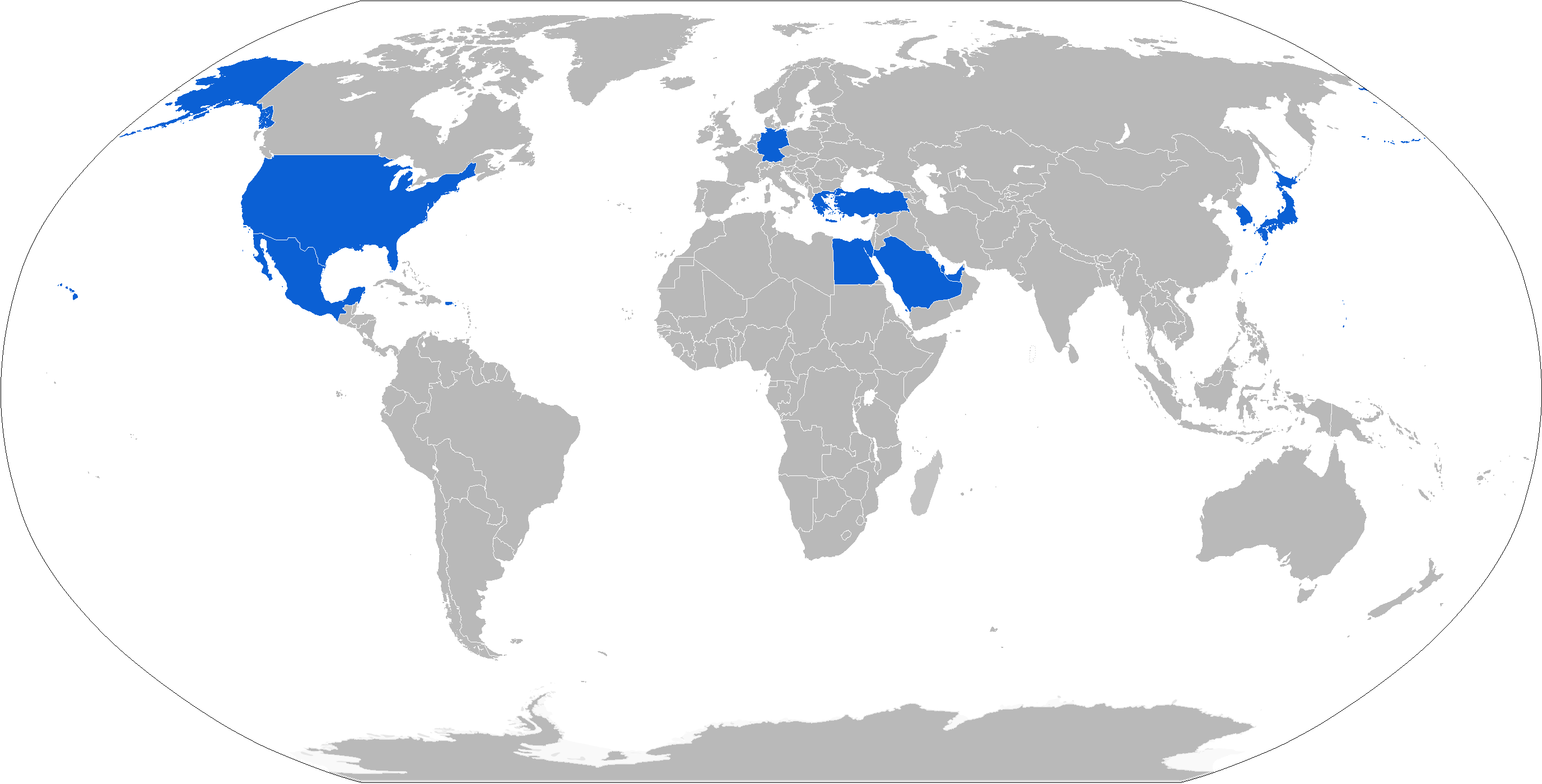
Map with RIM-116 operators in blue

- Egypt
- Germany
- Greece
- Japan
- Mexico
- Qatar
- South Korea
- Saudi Arabia
- Turkey
- United Arab Emirates
- United States

=== Future operators ===
The Dutch Ministry of Defence announced on 14 January 2021 that it wants to purchase the Rolling Airframe Missile to upgrade several of its ships, including the landing platform docks HNLMS Rotterdam and HNLMS Johan de Witt, the support ship HNLMS Karel Doorman and its new anti-submarine warfare frigates.

The Canadian Government on 28 June 2024 when announcing the River-class destroyers published a fact sheet that showed the Rolling Airframe Missile, replacing the previously selected CAMM for the close in defence role.

The Royal Australian Navy will be using SeaRAM as the CIWS of its general purpose frigate and is considering introducing RAM to replace the in-service Phalanx with the Hunter-class frigates being the first new combatant to feature the Mk144 launcher from the start.

== Gallery ==
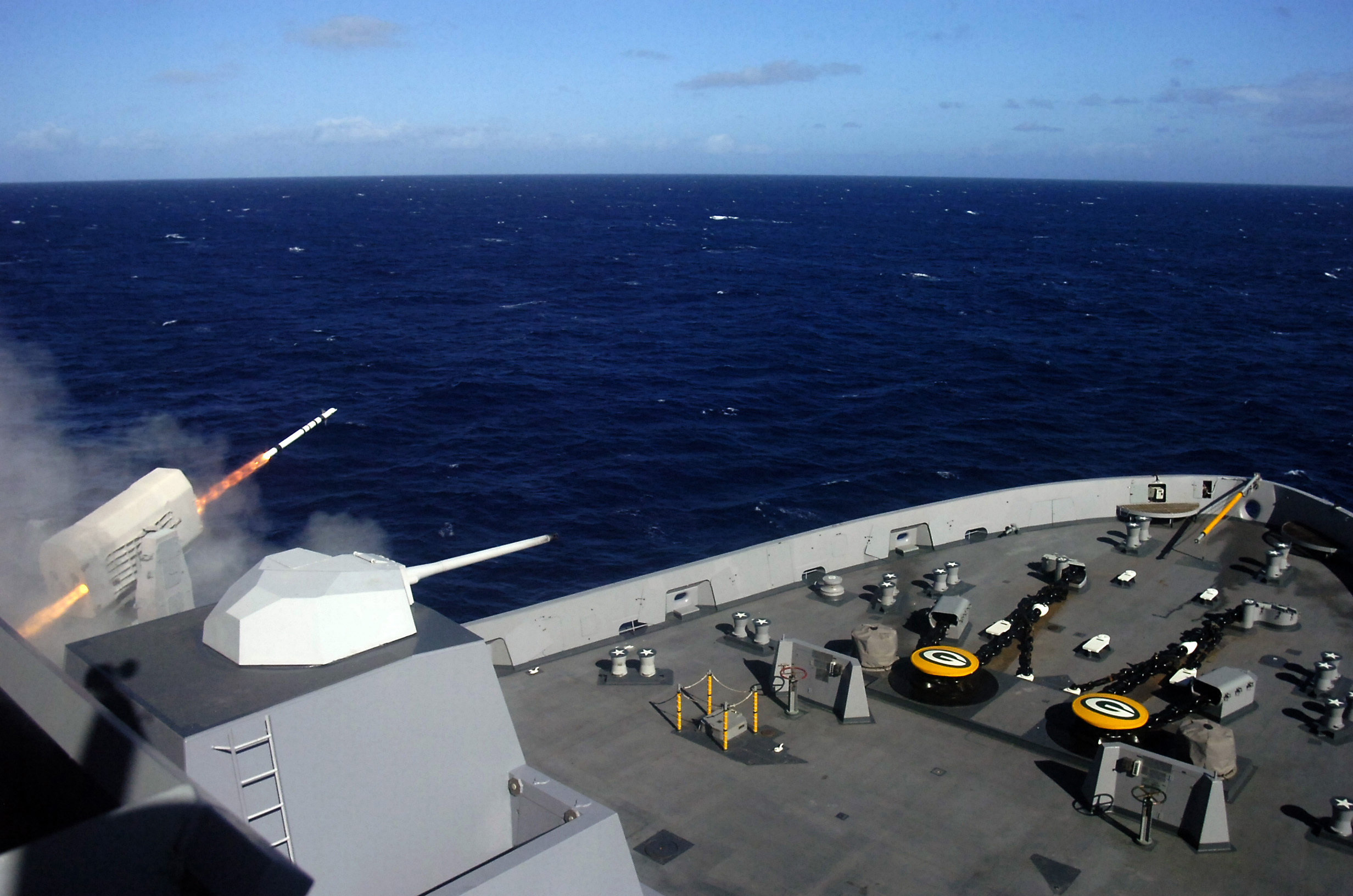
A Rolling Airframe Missile fired from USS Green Bay

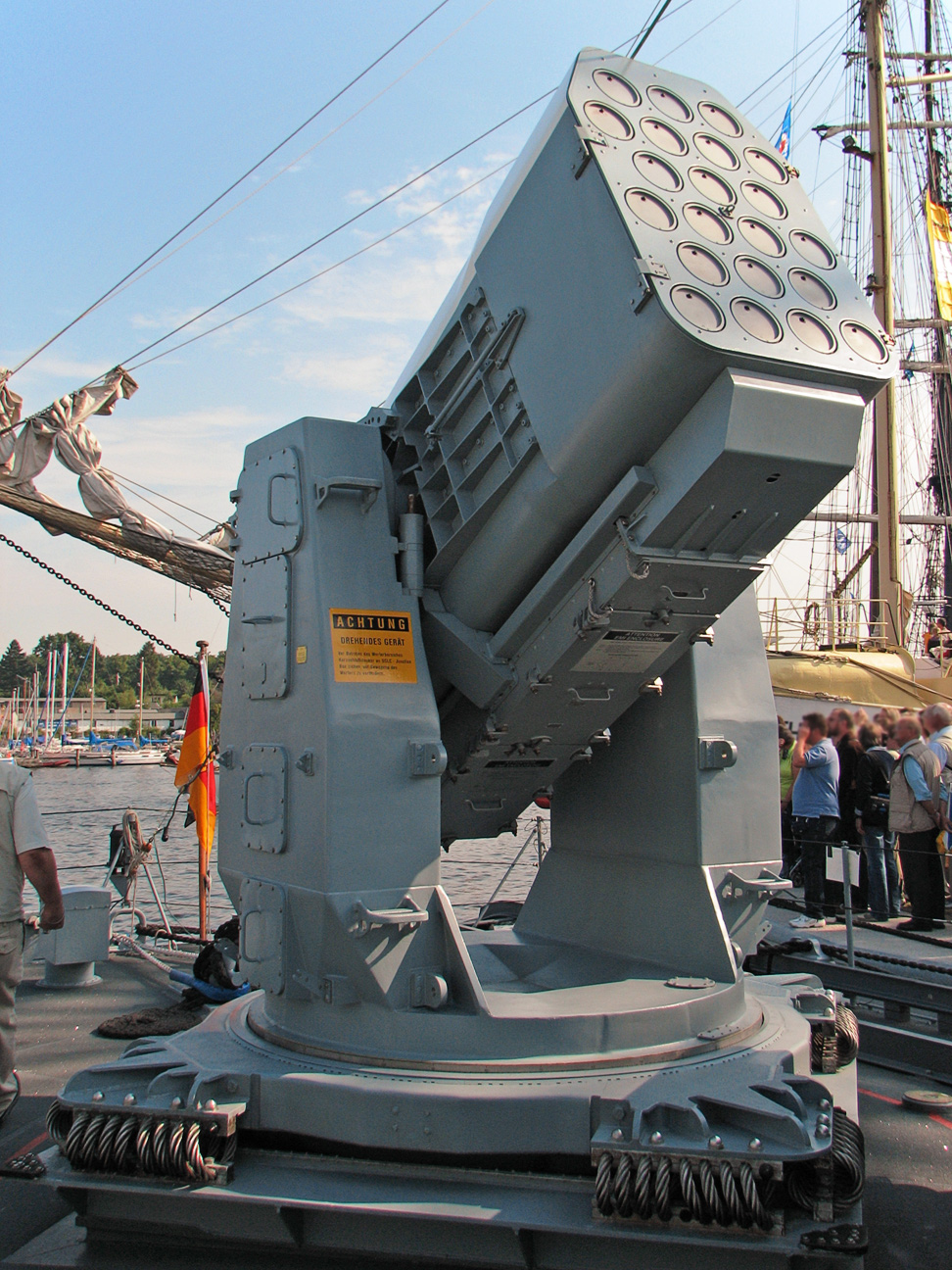
RAM Launcher on Gepard-class fast attack craft Ozelot of the German Navy

== See also ==
- Barak-1 – (Israel)
- GÖKSUR (Turkey)
- HHQ-10 – (China)
- Levent (Turkey)
- Sea Oryx – (Taiwan)
- Sea Wolf missile – (United Kingdom)
- Umkhonto missile – (South Africa)
