= China and weapons of mass destruction (disambiguation) =

China and weapons of mass destruction may refer to:

- People's Republic of China and weapons of mass destruction (mainland China)
- Republic of China and weapons of mass destruction (Taiwan)

== See also ==
- Political status of Taiwan
