= Chang Sen-i =

Taiwanese-American physicist (born 1943)

- 張憲義
- Born: 1943 (age 82–83); Haikou City, Japanese-occupied Hainan Island
- Other names: Gray Sen-i Chang; Chang Hsien-yi
- Education: National Tsing Hua University (BS); University of Tennessee (MS, PhD)
- Spouse: Hung Mei-feng
- Children: Three
- Scientific career
- Fields: Nuclear physics
- Military career
- Branch: Republic of China Army
- Rank: Colonel

Chang Sen-i
- Traditional Chinese: 張憲義
Transcriptions
Standard Mandarin
- Hanyu Pinyin: Zhāng Xiànyì
- Wade–Giles: Chang1 Hsien4-i4

Chang Sen-i (Chinese: 張憲義; Wade–Giles: Chang^{1} Hsien^{4}-i^{4}, Chang Hsien-yi; born 1943) is a Taiwanese-American nuclear engineer and former army colonel. He served as deputy director of Taiwan's Institute of Nuclear Energy Research (INER) before defecting to the United States in 1988. Recruited by the CIA, he exposed the secret nuclear program of Taiwan to the United States and was consequently placed under witness protection. Chang's information led President Ronald Reagan to insist that Taiwan shut down its nuclear weapons program.

== Early life ==
Chang was born in 1943 in Haikou City, Hainan under Japanese military occupation, with Taiwanese parents. After the surrender of Japan, Chang's family returned to Taiwan. He went to Taichung Second National High School, and attended National Tsing Hua University, where he obtained a Bachelor of Science degree. He earned a Ph.D. from the University of Tennessee in nuclear physics in 1976.

== Recruitment by the CIA ==
In 1967, Chang graduated from the military's Chung Cheng Institute of Technology (now National Defense University). Then from the 1970s, he was recruited by a case officer of the CIA while studying in America. While rising through the ranks in Taiwan, he passed on information to the USA. By 1987, as deputy director of INER, he was well-positioned to provide information about the country's secret small-scale plutonium extraction facility. At this time, beside the continuing policy by President Chiang government, the Reagan administration considered it possible that the secret program was proceeding without the knowledge of Vice President Lee Teng-hui.

== Defection to the United States of America ==
External image
- Declassified historical ROC Army nuclear strike plan covers Xiamen City & international Port of Economy Zone, population: 1.06 million

After the Lieyu massacre, Colonel Chang did not return to Taiwan from the holiday on January 9, 1988, and instead told his family to leave for Japan on January 8, one day before his departure to the United States under protection. Chang brought with him numerous top-secret documents that could not have been obtained by other means, though an article from the BBC claims Chang did not take a single document. A study into the secret program concluded that at the time of Chang's defection, Taiwan was one or two years away from being able to complete a nuclear bomb. According to The Economist, there were plans to fit nuclear warheads to Taiwan's Tien Ma, or 'Sky Horse' missile, which had an estimated range of up to 1,000 kilometres. There were also plans to load miniaturised nuclear weapons into the auxiliary fuel tanks of the Indigenous Defense Fighter. Armed with Chang's documents, President Reagan insisted that Taiwan shut down its program.

On 20 January, 7 days after the sudden death of President Chiang Ching-kuo, Director of Taipei Economic and Cultural Representative Office of Taipei Representative Office, David Dean met General Hau Pei-tsun, Chief of the General Staff of Republic of China Armed Forces in Taipei to reveal the U.S. reconnaissance satellite images showing a minimized nuclear explosion on the testing ground of NARI Jiupeng base in 1986, and that he had spoken with Chiang; Hao replied that, after nearly 20 years of research, ROC military scientist have successfully produced a controlled nuclear test. Dean demanded Hao to respect the agreement between President Reagan and President Lee to terminate the nuclear weapons development plan and to return 699 nuclear fuel rods back to the United States under the supervision of International Atomic Energy Agency and U.S. officials. Dean also warned that a gang from New York issued threats against Chang's family, while his parents in Taiwan were also harassed; U.S. government will hold General Hau accountable if anything happens to Chang's families. The situations indeed stopped afterwards as confirmed later.

After the testimony in a classified hearing in parliament, Colonel Chang was put in a witness protection program. A ROC military agent stationed in US used Chang's child data to found out his registry to an elementary school in Washington, D.C., then successfully tracked him after school to locate their home. The agent knew Chang's family being under the witness program, therefore secretly contacted a journalist to knock on their house door for interview without notification, which shocked the family. They were moved away overnight, and US authority dispelled the agent to return to Taiwan.

Taiwan's Ministry of Defence denied that Chang had been a CIA informant. Its retired Chief of General Staff (1981–1989), General Hau Pei-tsun, claimed that for more than a decade previously, Taiwan already had the potential to develop nuclear weapons. A former member of President Lee Teng-hui's national security team, Chang Jung-feng, has described Chang's actions as a 'betrayal'. The CIA has refused to discuss Chang's defection. James R. Lilley, who served as CIA station chief in Beijing, said the case should be 'publicly acknowledged as a success'.

Chang is quoted in The Taipei Times as saying that he was "...motivated by fears that his research into nuclear weapons would be used by 'politically ambitious' people who would harm Taiwan." In later life, he settled in Idaho and converted to Christianity. In an interview with CNN, Chang stated "developing any kind of deadly weapon was nonsense to me," and maintained that his actions kept the peace between Taiwan and China.

== Nuclear energy in Taiwan ==
Taiwan uses nuclear power for some of its electricity generation, but since 1988, its official position has been that it will not develop nuclear weapons. Were it to do so, China has said it would be 'a legitimate reason' to launch an attack on the island.

== See also ==
- Taiwan and weapons of mass destruction
