= Taiwan and weapons of mass destruction =

Taiwan
- Nuclear program start date: 1964
- Nuclear program end date: 1988
- Total tests: None
- Peak stockpile: None
- Current stockpile: None
- NPT party: Formerly
- Nuclear weapons stationing start date: 1958
- Nuclear weapons stationing provider: United States
- Peak nuclear weapons stationed: ~12
- Nuclear weapons stationing end date: 1974

Taiwan pursued a number of weapons of mass destruction programs from 1949 to the late 1980s. The final secret nuclear weapons program was shut down in the late 1980s under US pressure after completing all stages of weapons development besides final assembly and testing. Taiwan developed the AIDC F-CK-1 Ching-kuo and Sky Horse short-range ballistic missile as delivery systems. Currently, there is no evidence of Taiwan possessing any chemical, biological, or nuclear weapons.

Nuclear weapons from the United States were deployed to Taiwan from 1958 to 1972, during a period of higher tensions with China, including the Second Taiwan Strait Crisis.

== Nuclear weapons ==
During the Cold War, the United States deployed nuclear weapons on Taiwan as part of the United States Taiwan Defense Command. In 1972, United States president Richard Nixon ordered nuclear weapons to be removed from Taiwan and this was implemented by 1974. Nuclear weapons are known to have been stored at Tainan Air Force Base.

=== Research program ===
The development of nuclear weapons by Taiwan has been a contentious issue, as it had been triggered by the People's Republic of China first nuclear test in 1964. The United States, hoping to avoid escalating tensions in the Taiwan Strait, has continually opposed arming Taiwan with nuclear weapons after 1979. Accordingly, Taiwan adheres to the principles of the nuclear Non-Proliferation Treaty and has stated that it does not intend to produce nuclear weapons, on an official basis. Past nuclear research by Taiwan makes it a "threshold" nuclear state.

In 1967, a secret nuclear weapons program began under the auspices of the Institute of Nuclear Energy Research (INER) at the Chungshan Institute of Science and Technology. Taiwan was able to acquire nuclear technology from abroad (including a research reactor from Canada and low-grade plutonium from the United States) allegedly for a civilian energy system, but in actuality to develop fuel for nuclear weapons. Taiwan bought 100 tons of uranium metal from South Africa which was delivered between 1973 and 1974.

During the 1970s, Taiwan had an active program to produce plutonium using heavy water reactors. However, after the International Atomic Energy Agency (IAEA) found evidence of Taiwan's efforts to produce weapons-grade plutonium, Taiwan agreed in September 1976 under U.S. pressure to dismantle its nuclear weapons program. A study by the Mitre Corporation in 1977, included Taiwan in a list of "insecure" nuclear threshold states—states with the technical capability to develop nuclear weapons and the security motivations to seriously contemplate such an option. The other states were Israel, South Africa, South Korea, and Yugoslavia. U.S. intelligence also believed that Taiwan had designed devices suitable for nuclear testing. In 1980 the Taiwanese contracted for 4,000 tons of uranium metal from South Africa although it is not known how much of this order was ever delivered.

The leaders of the program needed very high assurance in the functioning and reliability of any nuclear device they designed, but without the ability to conduct a full-scale nuclear weapons test. Besides the need to keep the program covert, an underground nuclear test was not feasible on a small and densely populated island such as Taiwan. Therefore, the program used specialised computer software to simulate nuclear weapon explosions, the code of which was constantly upgraded and improved as more knowledge was acquired via experiments or by clandestine information gathering. To circumvent detection by foreign intelligence agencies while developing and refining necessary skills, Taiwan developed many dual-use activities, such as "anti-tank projectile" experiments. These involved uranium metal plates being slammed together at a tremendous velocity under controlled conditions, and high-speed diagnostic equipment monitoring the impact while recording temperature and pressure data, which was then fed back into the computer simulation software to improve the accuracy of how a nuclear device would behave during and after detonation.

These tests also allowed the testing of the reliability of the high explosives to be used in warheads and the detonating systems used to ensure the simultaneous triggering of many explosive panels on any implosion type designs. As well as enabling relevant data to be gathered and analyzed, these activities allowed Taiwanese technicians to practice daily the skills needed to produce actual warheads (such as the tooling of radioactive metals into individual components) if the order was ever given to begin full-scale production of nuclear weapons.

The secret nuclear weapon program was revealed after the 1987 Lieyu massacre, when Colonel Chang Hsien-yi Deputy Director of Nuclear Research at INER, who was secretly working for the CIA, defected to the U.S. in December 1987 and produced a cache of incriminating documents. General Hau Pei-tsun claimed that scientists in Taiwan had already produced a controlled nuclear reaction. Under pressure from the U.S., the program was halted. A study into the secret program concluded that at the time of Chang's defection, Taiwan was one or two years away from being able to complete a deliverable weapon. Chang claims that Madame Chiang Kai Shek and military officials loyal to her had expedited the development of nuclear weapons and even set up a parallel chain of command to further their agenda. In 1987 the warhead design had a diameter of 60–70 cm with casing and a weight of 900 kg meaning that further miniaturization would have been needed to optimize the weapon for delivery.

=== Delivery systems ===
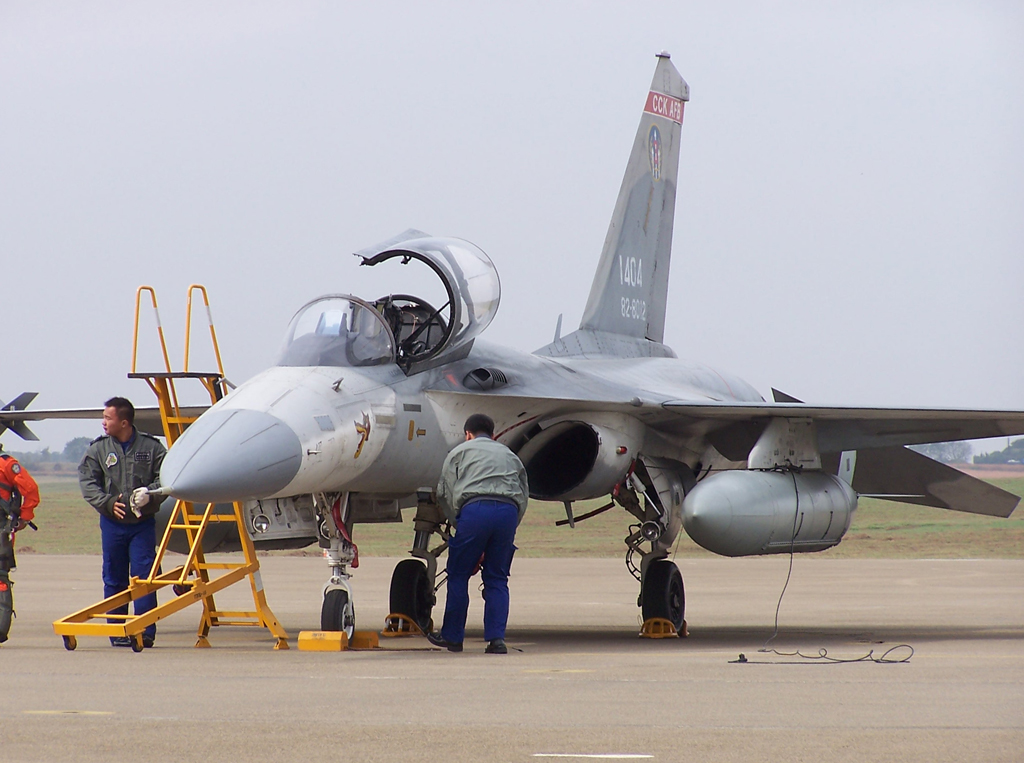
F-CK-1A IDF pre-production aircraft

The Sky Horse ballistic missile system was developed in the late 1970s and early 1980s before a combination of pressure from American President Ronald Reagan and internal competition from anti-ballistic missile development programs ended the program in 1982. Faced with an inability to field their desired delivery system planners turned to alternatives.

The secondary delivery vehicle was the AIDC F-CK-1 Ching-kuo, then in development. Weapons designers at CSIST (now NCSIST) were instructed to design the nuclear weapon to fit within the dimensions of the F-CK-1's centerline drop tank (~50 cm diameter). Modifications to the aircraft would have been required for it to obtain the desired 1,000 km range (especially without the centerline drop tank available). The F-CK-1 would not have been able to fulfill the nuclear strike mission until mid-1989 at the very earliest. Early designs called for an unpowered gravity bomb.

=== Current status ===
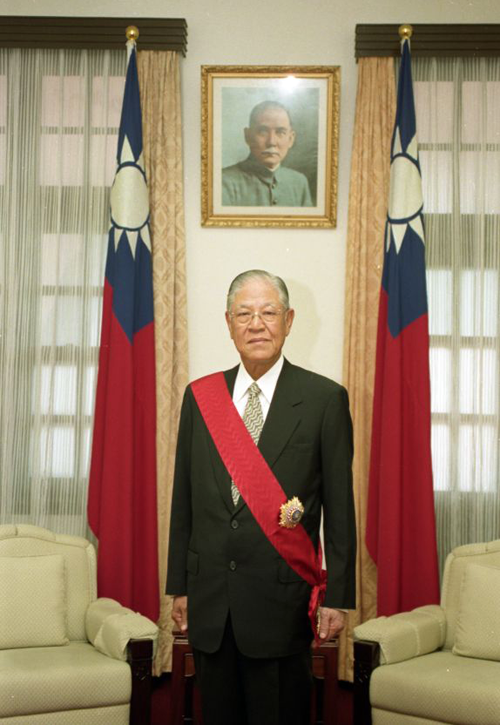
Former ROC President Lee Teng-hui

Since the end of the nuclear weapons program the “Nuclear Card” has played an important part in Taiwan's relationship with both the United States and China.

During the 1995–1996 Taiwan Strait crisis, then President of Taiwan, Lee Teng-hui, proposed to reactivate the program, but toned down the rhetoric a few days later, saying that although Taiwan was nuclear latent, it "will definitely not" produce nuclear weapons.

There is no evidence that Taiwan possesses any nuclear weapons or any programs to produce them, although it does have the advanced technological ability necessary to develop nuclear weapons as well as the high-tech ability to enrich uranium or process plutonium. Taiwan's nuclear power plants use imported enriched uranium and are subject to IAEA inspections.

Taiwan theoretically has the potential to develop nuclear weapons from domestic monazite reserves, and this potential was explored by the military in 1951–1952. However, the monazite's thorium content was deemed too low to justify recovering, and the military turned to friendly foreign sources instead.

In light of rising tensions in Cross-Strait relations, especially after Russia invaded Ukraine in 2022, some have called for Taiwan to arm itself with nuclear weapons, especially commentators in the United States. This is subject to wide debate, with some arguing that nuclear weapons could prove a deterrent strong enough to force the mainland to indefinitely postpone an invasion, given that Taiwan is not like Japan and South Korea in that the latter two have treaty-bound security guarantees from the United States, though opponents argue that nuclear weapons in themselves are costly, unpopular among the Taiwanese public, and that they themselves would instigate a conflict.

== Chemical and biological weapons ==
During the Japanese colonial period a chemical weapons factory was in operation in North Taiwan; the Nationalists took possession of this facility following the conclusion of World War II and are believed to have expanded the facility.

The U.S. Congress was informed in 1989 that Taiwan could have acquired offensive chemical weapons capability, including stockpiles of sarin. The alleged facilities include Tsishan and Kuanhsi. Taiwanese authorities acknowledged only the existence of a defensive research program.

In 1997 the Russian Foreign Intelligence Service assessed that Taiwan did not possess biological weapons but had "shown signs of conducting biological research of an applied military nature.”

There have been rumors of ongoing offensive and defensive Taiwanese biological and chemical weapons programs but no conclusive evidence of development or deployment has ever been presented.

In July 2023, United Daily News (UDN) reported allegations of a meeting between U.S. and Taiwanese officials regarding the creation of a bioweapon lab, which was denied by U.S. and Taiwanese authorities. Radio Free Asia's Asia Fact Check Lab (AFCL) found inconsistencies in the document's language and format, suggesting it was written in mainland Chinese, not Taiwanese style. This apparent disinformation was amplified by pro-China commentators in Taiwan and received widespread coverage in Chinese media.

== Ratification of international treaties ==
The Republic of China ratified the Geneva Protocol on August 7, 1929, and the Nuclear Non-Proliferation Treaty (NPT) in 1970, and Taiwan considers itself bound by both. Following UN General Assembly Resolution 2758 (1971), the United Nations recognizes the People's Republic of China and does not treat Taiwan as a sovereign state with the legal ability to join international treaties. Because of its controversial political status, Taiwan has not been allowed to join either the Biological Weapons Convention or the Chemical Weapons Convention, but it has stated that it will abide by both treaties nevertheless. In addition, Taiwan has stated that it will continue to abide by the NPT, notwithstanding Resolution 2758. Taiwan was one of the original members of the NPT in 1968. After the People's Republic of China replaced Taiwan at the United Nations in 1971, in effect Taiwan ceased to be active as a participating party to the official NPT activities. However, it signed a trilateral agreement with the United States and the IAEA in 1971 stating that it would continue to abide by the terms of the NPT as a ratification party. While not a member of the IAEA, Taiwan does continue to subscribe to the IAEA safeguards under two agreements, INFCIRC/133 and INFCIRC/158.

== See also ==
- Japan and weapons of mass destruction
- China and weapons of mass destruction
- United States and weapons of mass destruction
- History of the Republic of China
- Military of the Republic of China
- List of states with nuclear weapons
- Timeline of the Republic of China's nuclear program
