= Longtan National Speedway =

Motor racing circuit in Longtan, Taoyuan City, Taiwan

Longtan National Speedway 龍潭樂活賽車場
LTNS
- Location: Longtan, Taoyuan City, Taiwan
- Coordinates: 24°51′16″N 121°11′56″E
- Opened: 1993
- Closed: 2013
- Length: 1.850 km (1.150 mi)

Longtan National Speedway (Chinese: 龍潭樂活賽車場; pinyin: Lóngtán Lèhuó Sàichē Chǎng) is a motor racing circuit in Longtan District, Taoyuan City, Taiwan.

It is managed by the Chinese Taipei Motor Sports Association (CTMSA).
