= Longtan Lake =

Lake in Taoyuan, Taiwan

- 龍潭大池 (Chinese)
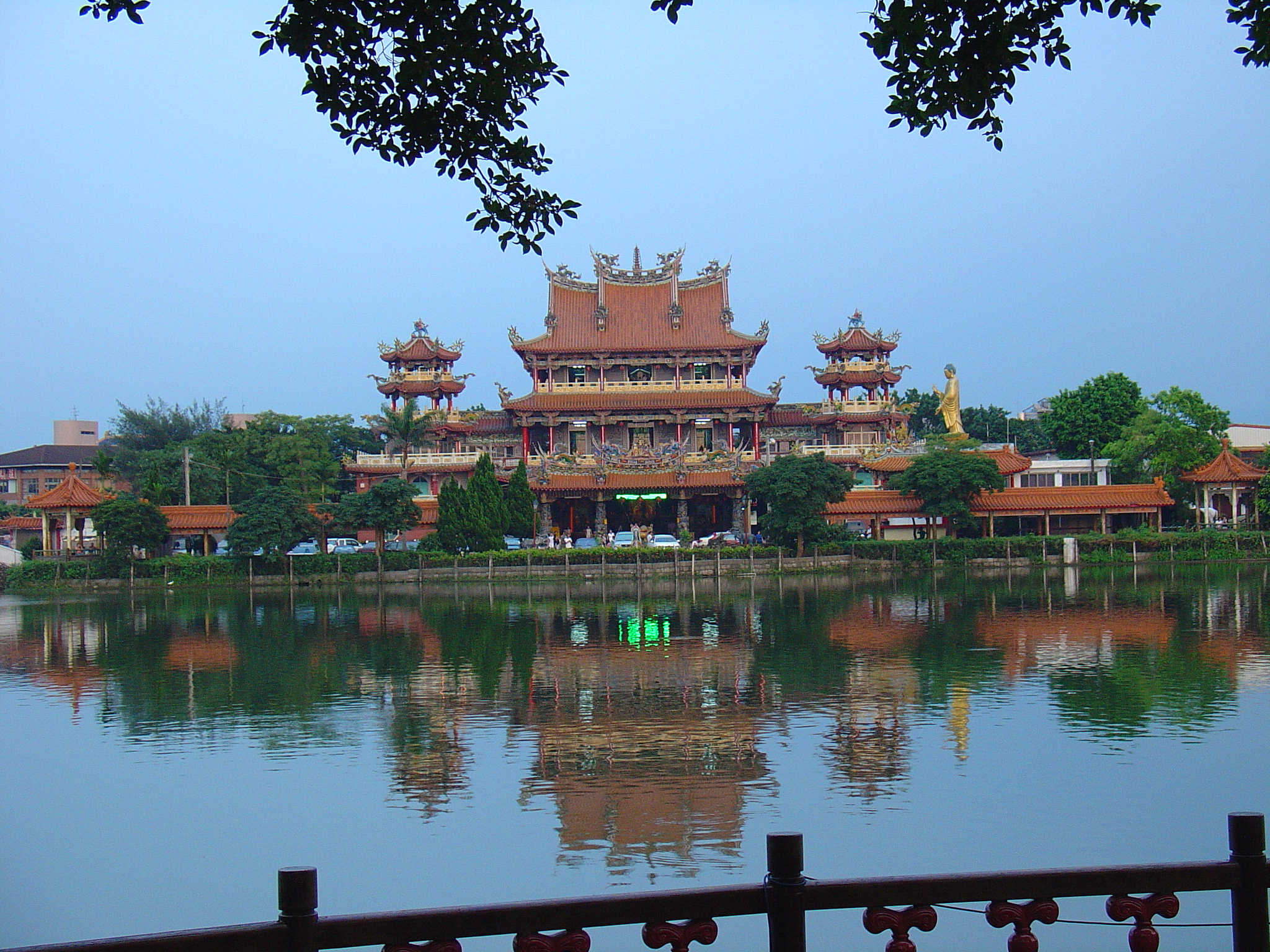

- Taiwan
- Location: Longtan, Taoyuan City, Taiwan
- Coordinates: 24°51′42.6″N 121°12′36.7″E
- Type: Lake
- Surface area: 18 hectares (44 acres)

Longtan Lake or Longtan Tourist Pond (traditional Chinese: 龍潭大池; simplified Chinese: 龙潭大池; pinyin: Lóngtán Dàchí) is a lake in Shanglin Village, Longtan District, Taoyuan City, Taiwan. The lake is known for the Buddhist temple in the centre of the lake.

== History ==
The lake was originally built for irrigation. After the construction of a temple nearby and the suspension bridge, the lake turned into a major tourist attraction in 1971.

== Geology ==
The lake spans over an area of 18 hectares. It consists of a bicycle trail, kiddy pool, children playground, lookout point, walking trail, memorial hall, water plant area, outdoor fitness facility and several pavilions.

== Activities ==
The lake is the venue for the annual dragon boat race.

== See also ==
- Geography of Taiwan
