= Longtan District, Taoyuan =

District in Taiwan

Longtan 龍潭區
- District
- Longtan District
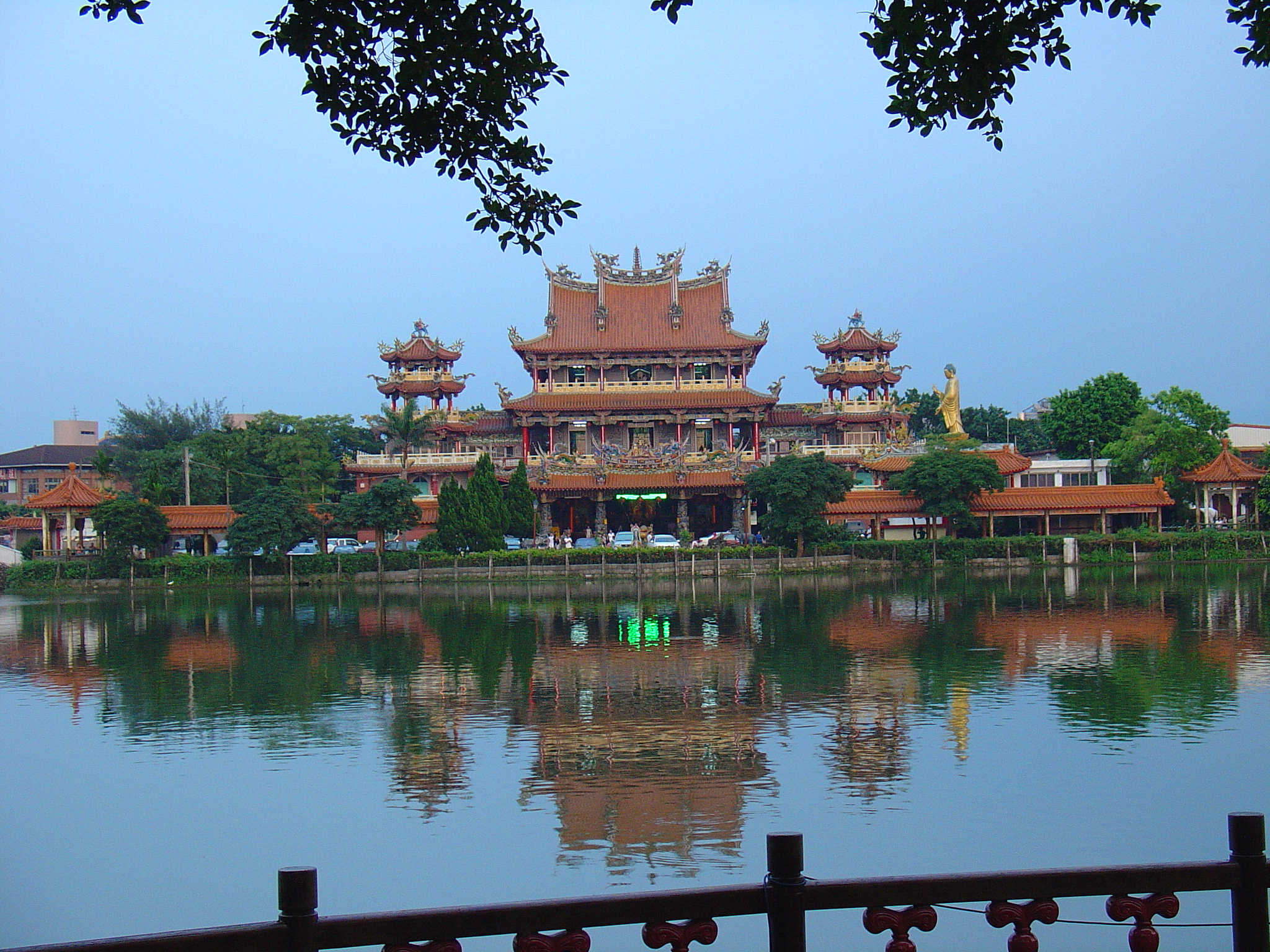
- Longtan Lake

- Coordinates: 24°50′40″N 121°12′19″E
- Country: Taiwan
- Municipality: Taoyuan

Government
  - Mayor: Yu-tsai, Deng

Area
  - Total: 75.2341 km^{2} (29.0480 sq mi)

Population (February 2023)
  - Total: 125,324
  - Density: 1,665.79/km^{2} (4,314.37/sq mi)
- Website: eng.tycg.gov.tw/Default.aspx (in Chinese)

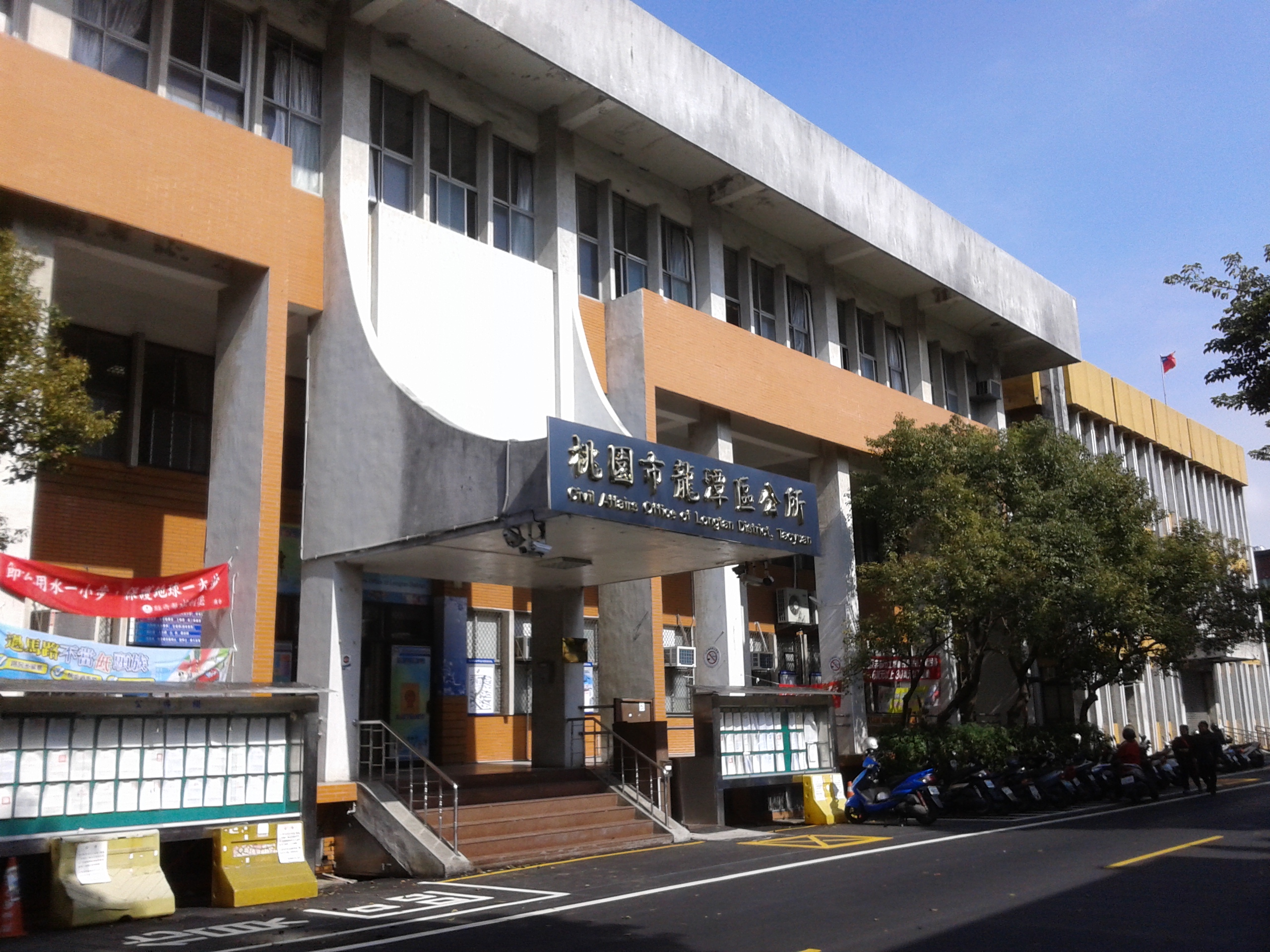
Longtan District office

Longtan District (Chinese: 龍潭區; pinyin: Lóngtán Qū) is a rural district in southern Taoyuan City, Taiwan. Longtan is home to the headquarters of the Republic of China Army.

The district is known for the Buddhist temple in the center of Longtan Lake and the large Bainien community project. The area is surrounded by high-tech industries and mountains.

Longtan is home to a number of military bases, and a few research installations. National Chung-Shan Institute of Science and Technology and Institute of Nuclear Energy Research are two of the more well known ones.

== History ==
Longtan used to be a rural township of the former Taoyuan County. On 25 December 2014, it was upgraded into a district of Taoyuan City.

== Geography ==
- Area: 75.23 km^{2}
- Population: 125,324 people (February 2023)

== Administrative divisions ==
Huangtang, Yongxing, Zhongshan, Wushulin, Wulin, Bonian, Lingyun, Longxiang, Bade, Shengde, Shanglin, Longtan, Longxing, Zhongzheng, Shanghua, Jiulong, Wuhan, Tungxing, Zhongxing, Beixing, Jiaan, Sankeng, Daping, Sanlin, Jianlin, Fulin, Gaoping, Gaoyuan, Sanhe and Sanshui Village.

== Politics ==
The district is part of Taoyuan City Constituency V electoral district for Legislative Yuan.

== Government institutes ==
- Institute of Nuclear Energy Research
- National Chung-Shan Institute of Science and Technology

== Education ==
- Hsin Sheng College of Medical Care and Management

== Tourist attractions ==
- Longtan Lake
- Longtan National Speedway
- Shihmen Dam
- Taoyuan Hakka Culture Hall
- Window on China Theme Park
- Yehshan Building

== Transportation ==
=== Bus stations ===
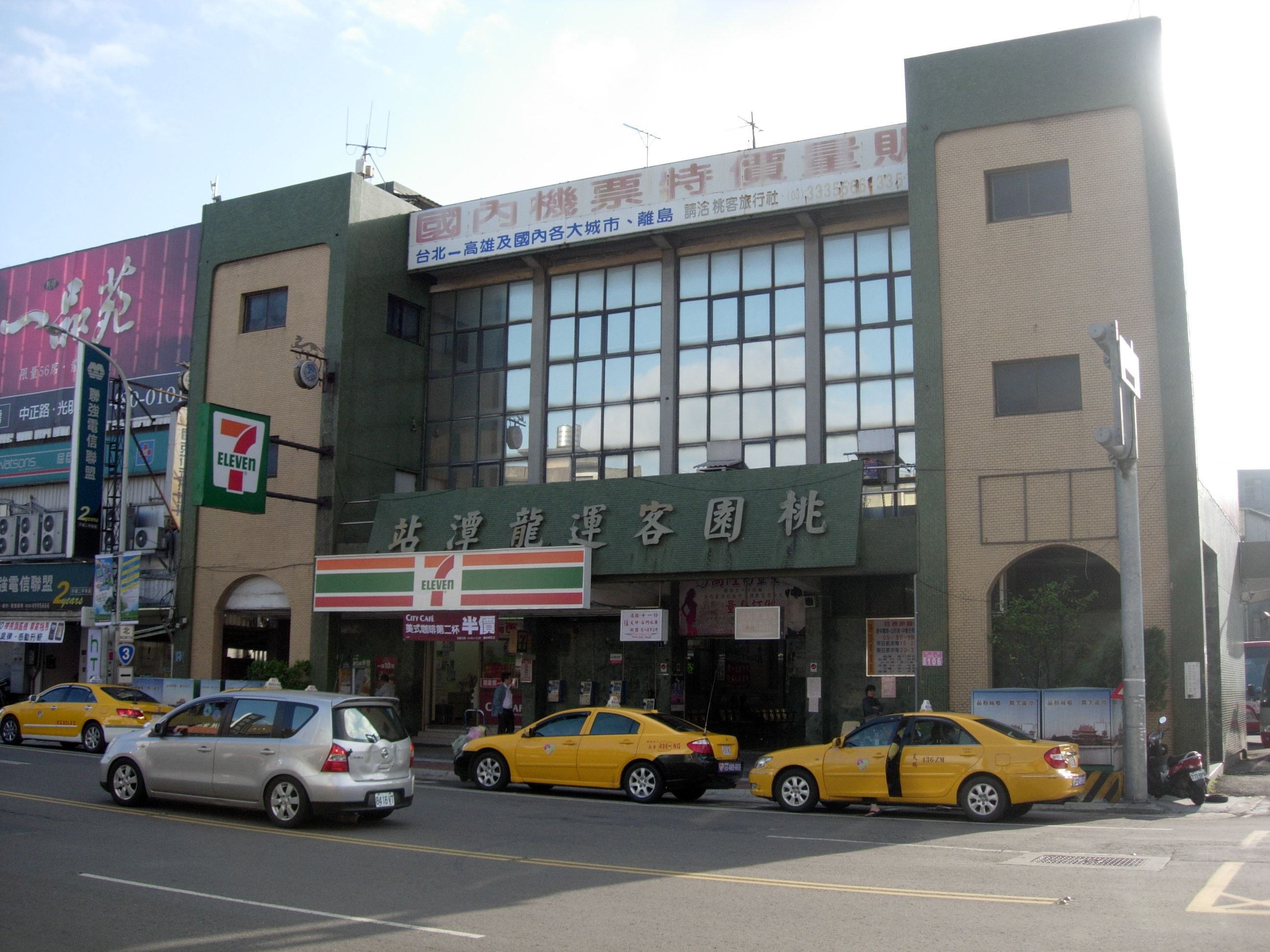
Longtan Bus Station

- Longtan Bus Station of Hsinchu Bus
- Longtan Bus Station of Taoyuan Bus

=== Highway ===
Longtan is served by National Highway No. 3.

== Notable natives ==
- Esther Huang, actress and singer
- You Jih-cheng, politician
- Teng Yu-hsien, former musician

== See also ==
- Taoyuan City
