= Political status of Taiwan =

Dispute over sovereignty and independence of Taiwan

- Traditional Chinese: 臺灣問題
- Simplified Chinese: 台湾问题
- Literal meaning: Taiwan issue / Taiwan question
Transcriptions
Standard Mandarin
- Hanyu Pinyin: Táiwān wèntí
- Bopomofo: ㄊㄞˊ ㄨㄢ ㄨㄣˋ ㄊㄧˊ
- Wade–Giles: T'ai2-wan1 wên4-t'i2
Hakka
- Romanization: Thòi-vàn mun-thì
Yue: Cantonese
- Yale Romanization: Tòihwāan mahntàih
Eastern Min
- Fuzhou BUC: Dài-uăng ông-dà̤

The political status of Taiwan is a longstanding geopolitical subject focusing on the sovereignty of the island of Taiwan and its associated islands. The dispute stems from the transfer of the administration of Taiwan from the Empire of Japan to the Republic of China (ROC) in 1945, and the ROC government's retreat from mainland China to Taiwan as the result of the Chinese Civil War in 1949. The Taiwan Area since then has become the major territorial base of the ROC and which has exercised state authority there independently. Though never having control of Taiwan, the Chinese Communist Party (CCP)-led People's Republic of China (PRC) claims it as an inalienable province of China. The PRC's claim is based on the theory of state succession, whereby it deems itself the regime that replaced the ROC as the sole legitimate government of China upon its establishment in 1949, and thus it denies the sovereignty of the ROC in Taiwan under its one China principle. The geopolitical dispute is the core issue of cross-strait relations, and also a pivotal subject in China–United States relations and China–Japan relations.

Taiwan along with the Penghu islands were ceded to Japan under the terms of the Treaty of Shimonoseki after Japan’s victory over the Qing dynasty at the First Sino-Japanese War in 1895, which began 50-year Japanese rule over Taiwan. The 1911 Revolution led to the eventual collapse of the Qing dynasty and the founding of the Republic of China (ROC) on mainland China. The surrender of Japan in 1945 ended its rule over Taiwan and Penghu, which were placed under the administration of the ROC as agreed among the major Allies of World War II. The Chinese Civil War subsequently broke out between Kuomintang-led ROC government and the CCP, ultimately resulting in a Communist victory, which assumed control of the mainland and established the PRC in 1949, forcing the ROC to retreat to Taiwan. The division led to the emergence of two rival governments on opposite sides of the Taiwan Strait, each claiming to be the sole legitimate authority over both mainland China and Taiwan. The Treaty of San Francisco was signed between Japan and most of the Allied powers in 1952, in which Japan renounced all rights and claims to Taiwan, without naming the specific receiver of Taiwan's sovereignty. Due to the ongoing rivalry between the Kuomintang and the CCP, neither party was present at the treaty signing. The PRC disputes the legality of the treaty because of Chinese absence, and instead interprets the Cairo Declaration, the Potsdam Declaration and UN General Assembly Resolution 2758 as supporting documents to place Taiwan under Chinese sovereignty.

The PRC and historically the ROC both officially adhere to the principle of "one China," but fundamentally disagree on who is entitled to represent it. This has resulted in what is known as the "Two Chinas" scenario. The 1991 constitutional amendments and the 1992 Cross-Strait Relations Act marked a pivotal shift, as the ROC ceased actively claiming governance over the mainland, stopped treating the CCP as a rebellious group but instead recognizing it as governing authority of mainland China from ROC's perspective, though the ROC constitution still technically includes the mainland as ROC territory. Within Taiwan, there emerged a major political contention between eventual Chinese unification with a pan-Chinese identity contrasted with formal independence promoting a Taiwanese identity, though moderates supporting the status quo have gained broad appeal in the 21st century. From 2000 to 2008 and since 2016, Democratic Progressive Party-led ROC governments do not seek to represent China and have been more autonomist in orientation, and affirms its position that Taiwan is already a sovereign country under the name "Republic of China" and not subordinate to the PRC. The PRC has officially committed to use peaceful methods to achieve eventual unification but simultaneously refused to rule out using military force to achieve it. It has proposed the "one country, two systems" as a model for a peaceful unification, which has been rejected by successive Taiwanese governments.

The international status of Taiwan is complex, but largely agreed upon. Since 1949, multiple countries have faced a choice between the PRC and the ROC with regard to establishing formal diplomatic relations and shaping their respective "One China" policy. The PRC was initially excluded from the United Nations in favor of the ROC; the PRC gained formal recognition as the only legitimate government of China in 1971, when UN General Assembly Resolution 2758 (XXVI) was passed. Today, the ROC has formal diplomatic relations with only twelve nations but maintains unofficial bilateral ties with other countries through its representative offices, and membership in international organizations as a non-state entity. According to a Lowy Institute tally in January 2025, about 74 percent (142) of the UN member states explicitly endorse the PRC's position that Taiwan is a part of China. However, 23 of those states do not endorse the one-China principle, while others merely acknowledge or respect rather than recognize the PRC position.

== Background ==
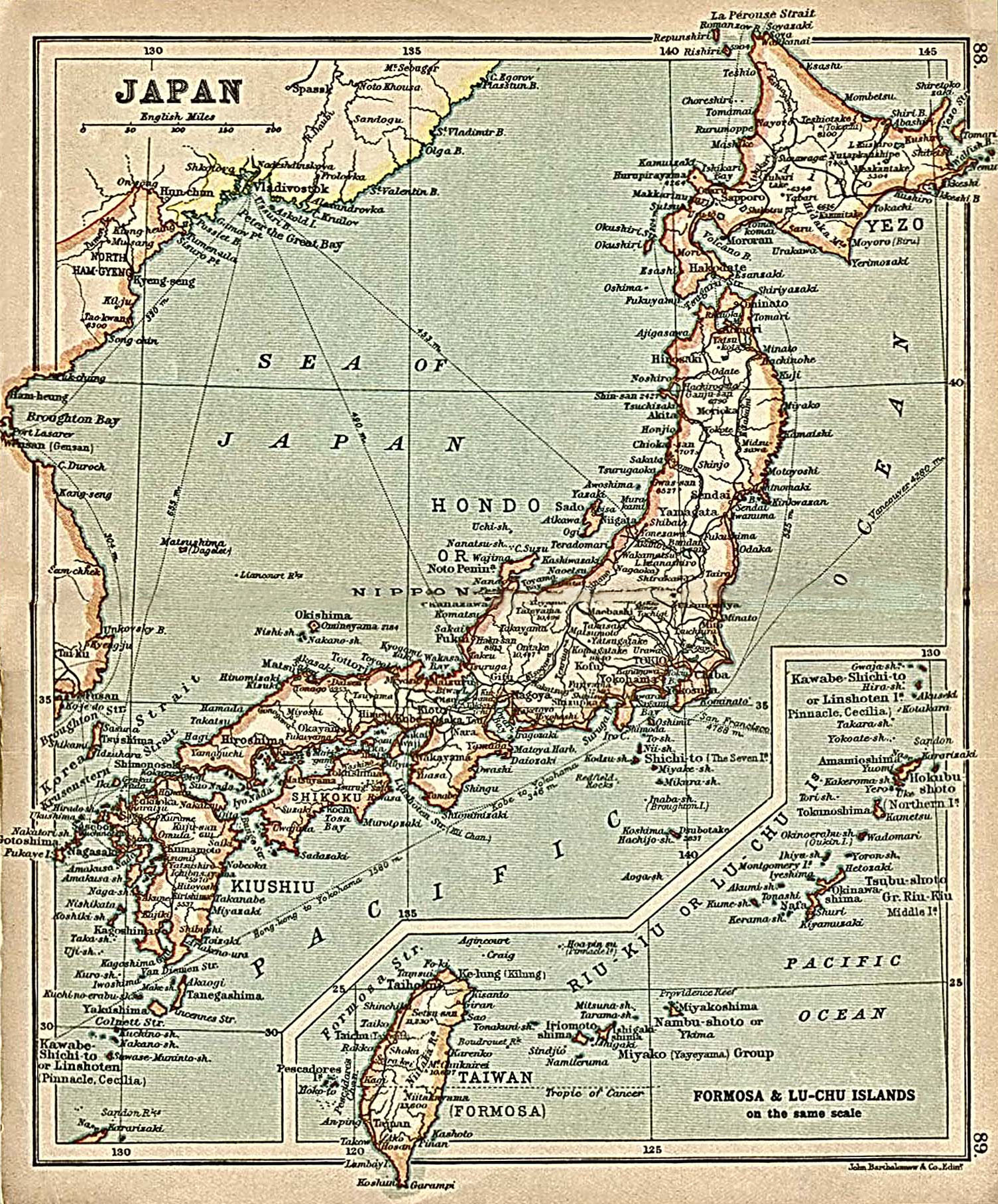
The map in 1912 depicted Taiwan as part of Japan, the island was annexed by the Empire of Japan from Qing China in the Treaty of Shimonoseki. The PRC (founded 1 October 1949) argues that the treaty was an unequal treaty forced upon China and was never valid.

=== Pre-WWII ===
Taiwan (excluding Penghu) was first populated by Austronesian people. Chinese people started settling in southern Taiwan by the late 16th century. The island was partially colonized by the Dutch who arrived in 1623. The Dutch colony was ousted by the Kingdom of Tungning, which lasted from 1661 to 1683, and was the first ethnic Han government to rule part of the island of Taiwan. From 1683, the Qing dynasty ruled much of the western plains of the island as a prefecture and in 1875 divided the island into two prefectures, Taiwan and Taipeh. In 1887 the island was made into a separate province to speed up development in this region. In the aftermath of the First Sino-Japanese War, Taiwan and Penghu were ceded by the Qing dynasty to Japan in 1895 under the Treaty of Shimonoseki. The Qing dynasty fell in 1912, leaving warlords to compete for power and influence in China. The country became more unified during the Nanjing decade, and growing calls to push back against Japanese aggression led to the formation of the Second United Front before the Second Sino-Japanese War.

ROC leaders such as Sun Yat-sen and Chiang Kai-shek had expressed support for independence of Korea and Taiwan from Japan.

==== Early CCP position on Taiwan ====
It is the immediate task of China to regain all our lost territories[...] [w]e do not, however, include Korea, formerly a Chinese colony, [...] and if the Koreans wish to break away from the chains of Japanese imperialism, we will extend them our enthusiastic help in their struggle for independence. The same thing applies for Formosa.

— Mao Zedong, 1937

Academics Frank S. T. Hsiao and Lawrence R. Sullivan wrote in 1979, "between 1928 and 1943 Communist Party leaders consistently recognized the Taiwanese" as a "distinct" minzu (民族), a term that can refer to people, nation, nationality, or ethnic group. (Note: "The CCP leadership considered the Taiwanese people ... a distinct "minzu." To be sure, the exact meaning of the term "minzu" ... is subject to debate.") Hsiao and Sullivan theorized that the CCP "believe[d] that the long dissociation of Taiwan from the Chinese state had had a fundamental impact on the Taiwan people's nationality", (Note: "In this sense, peoples whose political links to Chinese culture were severed and, as in Taiwan's case, replaced by an alternative cultural tradition, transmitted through instruction in the Japanese language, ceased to be an integral part of the Chinese nation and emerged as a different "nationality," yet without losing all of their Chinese qualities."). Hsiao and Sullivan wrote that "[i]n Mao's eyes Taiwan was neither an integral part of Japan, nor sovereign Chinese territory, but, like Korea, a colony of Japan striving for an independent determination of its political future", and quoted Chen Shaoyu's 1938 listing of Taiwan and Korea among the "national liberation movements (minzujiefangyundong)" by "weak and small nationalities under the oppression of Japanese imperialism". Hsiao and Sullivan additionally wrote that "[t]he CCP Central Committee seemingly accepted Mao's and Chen's views". Quoting Zhou Enlai's 1941 statement that "we should sympathize with independence-liberation movements (獨立解放運動) of other nation-states (民族國家)", Hsiao and Sullivan argued that Zhou "included the Taiwan anti-Japanese movement in the larger anti-colonial, national liberation struggles sweeping the oppressed peoples of the Western colonial empires – a position [Zhou] was to popularize in 1955 at the Bandung, Indonesia conference, but with the exclusion of Taiwan."

In a 1937 interview with Edgar Snow, Mao Zedong stated "we will extend them (the Koreans) our enthusiastic help in their struggle for independence. The same thing applies for Taiwan." (Note: "Mao answered: It is the immediate task of China to regain all our lost territories, not merely to defend our sovereignty below the Great Wall. This means that Manchuria must be regained. We do not, however, include Korea, formerly a Chinese colony, but when we have re-established the independence of the lost territories of China, and if the Koreans wish to break away from the chains of Japanese imperialism, we will extend them our enthusiastic help in their struggle for independence. The same thing applies for Formosa.[...] The support for independence of Korea and Taiwan, both of which were formerly linked to China, is clearly stated. Moreover, Mao was talking about the creation of a separate state and not the less independent, autonomous states like Inner Mongolia, Tibet, and Outer Mongolia" (italics in original)) (Note: Van der Wees references Hsiao and Sullivan as the original source.) The academics state that the CCP's stance might have been intended as a temporary measure to build a coalition against Japan, which had colonized both Korea and Taiwan, (Note: "If CCP support for Taiwan's ethnic separateness and political independence was based solely on strategic considerations during a period when all potential allies needed to be drawn into a broad anti-Japanese coalition and under Comintern pressure, then once in power they would naturally assume the role of the protective state and shift to an integrationist policy position.") or could have gone "beyond mere political calculation and expressed a genuine commitment by the CCP to Taiwan's right of self-determination".

=== WWII ===
In 1943 Chiang's Nationalists argued that after the end of the war, Taiwan should be restored to the ROC. The CCP followed suit and considered Taiwan an integral part of China. (Note: [W]e cannot discount the impact on the Communists of an international agreement which they accepted as members of the Second United Front and which elevated the Taiwan question to an international level and neatly avoided the issue of Taiwanese representation[sic]. Outright rejection of the Cairo declaration after 1943 (and before the CCP's unexpectedly swift victory in 1949) would have destroyed CCP efforts at gaining international recognition. (After 1949, it would have added an air of legitimacy to KMT occupation of the island and encouraged an indefinite extension of the civil war.) Without strong Taiwanese participation in the Chinese Communist movement, there was simply no compelling reason for the CCP to reject a major international agreement. In effect, Cairo structured the political alternatives on the Taiwan issue in such a manner that continued Communist support for "national liberation" of the island was impossible.) Representatives of the United States and the United Kingdom agreed with Chiang at the Cairo Conference in November, resulting in the Cairo Declaration. The Cairo Declaration stated, "All the territories Japan has stolen from China, such as Manchuria, Formosa [Taiwan], and the Pescadores, shall be returned to the Republic of China." That pledge was confirmed at the Potsdam Conference in 1945.

=== Post-WWII ===
In 1945 Chinese Nationalists accepted the surrender of the Japanese forces in Taiwan on behalf of the Allied powers, ending 50 years of Japanese rule. Confident about their future prospects, they declared Taiwan a province of China again on 26 October 1945. However the final legal dispensation awaited a peace treaty and formal ratification.

In 1949, Mao Zedong's forces defeated Chiang Kai-shek's ROC forces in the Chinese Civil War, thus taking control of mainland China and founding the PRC. The KMT leaderships along with the ROC government fled to Taiwan, retained under the ROC control. Tensions often soared in the following decades. The PRC shelled offshore islands held by the ROC government of Taiwan in the 1950s, and the ROC for a number of years harbored ambitions of recovering the mainland from the CCP. Throughout the 1950s and 1960s, the United Nations and most non-Communist nations still recognized the ROC as the sole government of China. Non-Communist nations referred to the CCP-controlled mainland as "Red China" during this time.

In 1971, the UN General Assembly voted to move the "China" United Nations seat from the ROC to the PRC. The United States recognized the KMT government in Taiwan (ROC) as the legitimate representative of all China until 1979. And the ROC itself claimed to be the sole legitimate representative of all China until 1988. As of the present, most nations have switched their official diplomatic recognition of "China" to the PRC, though some of these nations have avoided clarifying what territories are meant by "China" in order to associate with both the PRC and ROC. These countries use vague terms such as "respects", "acknowledge", "understand", or "take note of" in regards to the PRC's claim over Taiwan, rather than officially "recognizing" the claim. From 1988 onwards the Government of Taiwan turned to a checkbook diplomacy promising economic support in return of diplomatic recognition. Until 1995, Taiwan was able to establish diplomatic ties with 29 countries. However this policy was stalled by the PRC as it suspended trade with any country that held diplomatic ties with Taiwan.

== Historical overview ==
=== End of Japanese rule ===
In 1942, after the United States entered the war against Japan and on the side of China, the Chinese government under the Kuomintang renounced all treaties signed with Japan before that date and made Taiwan's return to China (as with Manchuria, ruled as the Japanese puppet state of Manchukuo) one of the wartime objectives. In the Cairo Declaration of 1943, the Allied Powers declared the return of Taiwan (including the Pescadores) to the Republic of China as one of several Allied demands. The Cairo Declaration was never signed or ratified. Both of the US and the UK considered it not legally binding. The ROC, on the other hand, asserts that it is legally binding and lists later treaties and documents that "reaffirmed" the Cairo Declaration as legally binding. The PRC also considers the declaration to be legally binding.

In 1945, Japan unconditionally surrendered with the signing of the instrument of surrender and ended its rule in Taiwan as the territory was put under the administrative control of the Republic of China government in 1945 by the United Nations Relief and Rehabilitation Administration. The Office of the Supreme Commander for the Allied Powers ordered Japanese forces in China and Taiwan to surrender to Chiang Kai-shek, who would act as a representative of the Allied Powers. On 25 October 1945, Governor-General Rikichi Andō handed over the administration of Taiwan and the Penghu islands to the head of the Taiwan Investigation Commission, Chen Yi. On 26 October, the government of the Republic of China declared that Taiwan had become a province of China. The Allied Powers, on the other hand, did not recognize the unilateral declaration of annexation of Taiwan made by the government of the Republic of China.

In accordance with the provisions of Article 2 of San Francisco Peace Treaty, Japan formally "renounced all right, title, and claim" to Taiwan in 1952, without naming the specific receiver of Taiwan's sovereignty. Nonetheless, the Republic of China and Japan signed the Treaty of Taipei on 28 April 1952, and the treaty came into force on 5 August, which is considered by some as giving a legal support to the Republic of China's claim to Taiwan as de jure territory. The treaty stipulates that all treaties, conventions, and agreements between China and Japan prior to 9 December 1941 were null and void, which according to Hungdah Chiu, abolishes the Treaty of Shimonoseki ceding Taiwan to Japan. The interpretation of Taiwan becoming the Republic of China's de jure territory is supported by several Japanese court decisions such as the 1956 Japan v. Lai Chin Jung case, which stated that Taiwan and the Penghu islands came to belong to the ROC on the date the Treaty of Taipei came into force. Nevertheless, the official position of the Government of Japan is that Japan did not in the Treaty of Taipei express that Taiwan and Penghu belong to the Republic of China, that the Treaty of Taipei could not make any disposition which is in violation of Japan's renouncing Taiwan and Penghu in San Francisco Peace Treaty, and that the status of Taiwan and Penghu remain to be determined by the Allied Powers in the future.

Writing in the American Journal of International Law, professors Jonathan I. Charney and J. R. V. Prescott argued that "none of the post–World War II peace treaties explicitly ceded sovereignty over the covered territories to any specific state or government." The Cairo Conference from 22 to 26 November 1943 in Cairo, Egypt was held to address the Allied position against Japan during World War II, and to make decisions about postwar Asia. One of the three main clauses of the Cairo Declaration was that "all the territories Japan has stolen from the Chinese, such as Manchuria, Formosa, and The Pescadores, shall be restored to the Republic of China". According to Taiwan Civil Society quoting the Taiwan Documents Project, the document was merely a statement of intent or non-binding declaration, for possible reference used for those who would draft the post-war peace treaty and that as a press release it was without force of law to transfer sovereignty from Taiwan to the Republic of China. Additional rationale to support this claim is that the Act of Surrender, and SCAP General Order no. 1, authorized the surrender of Japanese forces, not Japanese territories.

In 1952, Winston Churchill said that Taiwan was not under Chinese sovereignty and the Chinese Nationalists did not represent the Chinese state, but that Taiwan was entrusted to the Chinese Nationalists as a military occupation. Churchill called the Cairo Declaration outdated in 1955. The legality of the Cairo Declaration was not recognized by the deputy prime minister of the United Kingdom, Anthony Eden, in 1955, who said there was a difference of opinion on which Chinese authority to hand it over to. In 1954, the United States denied that the sovereignty of Taiwan and the Penghu islands had been settled by any treaties, although it acknowledged that the Republic of China effectively controlled Taiwan and Penghu. In the 1960 Sheng v. Rogers case, it was stated that, in the view of the U.S. State Department, no agreement has purported to transfer the sovereignty of Taiwan to the ROC, though it accepted the exercise of Chinese authority over Taiwan and recognized the Government of the Republic of China as the legal government of China at the time.

The position of the US stated in the Department of State Bulletin in 1958 is that any seizure of Taiwan by the PRC "constitutes an attempt to seize by force territory which does not belong to it" because the Allied Powers had yet to come to a decision on the status of Taiwan. According to Vincent Wei-Cheng Wang, a minority of scholars and politicians have argued that the international status of Taiwan is still undecided, and that this has been used as an argument against the People's Republic of China's claim over Taiwan. They point to President Truman's statement on the pending status of Taiwan in 1950, the lack of specificity on whom the title of Taiwan was transferred to in the 1951 San Francisco peace treaty, and the absence of explicit provisions on the return of Taiwan to China in the 1952 Treaty of Taipei. However Wang notes that this is a weak argument, citing 2 Lassa Oppenheimer, International Law, under the principle of effective occupation and control, if nothing is stipulated on conquered territory in the peace treaty, the possessor may annex it. Still, the notion that a possessor may annex a conquered territory despite the peace treaty not stipulating so, was a means of territorial transfer recognized by classical international law, and its legality in recent years is either not recognized or disputed. According to Jian-De Shen, a Taiwanese independence activist, applying such a notion on the Republic of China's territorial claim for Taiwan is invalid because the conqueror of World War II is the whole body of the Allied Powers rather than the Republic of China alone. The Theory of the Undetermined Status of Taiwan is supported by some politicians and jurists to this day, such as the Government of the United States and the Japanese diplomatic circle.

=== Since 1945: post-World War II status ===
==== 1947: 228 Incident ====
When the 228 Incident erupted on 28 February 1947, the U.S. Consulate-General in Taipei prepared a report in early March, calling for an immediate intervention in the name of the U.S. or the United Nations. Based on the argument that the Japanese surrender did not formally transfer sovereignty, Taiwan was still legally part of Japan and occupied by the United States (with administrative authority for the occupation delegated to the Chinese Nationalists), and a direct intervention was appropriate for a territory with such status. This proposed intervention, however, was rejected by the U.S. State Department. In a news report on the aftermath of the 228 Incident, some Taiwanese residents were reported to be talking of appealing to the United Nations to put the island under an international mandate since China's possession of Taiwan had not been formalized by any international treaties by that time, and the island was therefore still under belligerent occupation. They later made a demand for a treaty role to be represented at the forthcoming peace conference in Japan, in the hope of requesting a plebiscite to determine the island's political future.

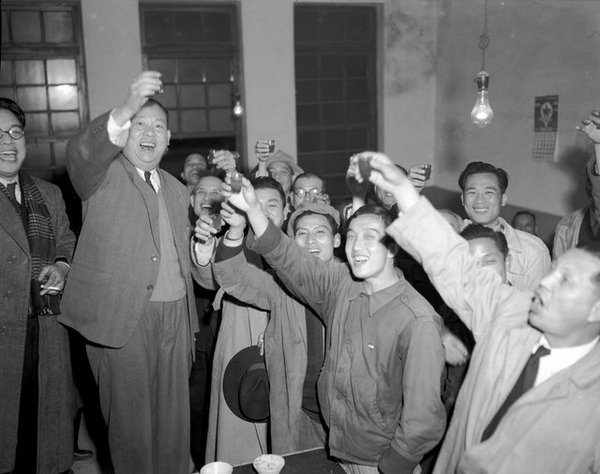
Non-partisan Taiwanese political candidate Wu San-lian (2L) celebrated his landslide victory (65.5%) in the first Taipei city mayoral election in January 1951 with his supporters. Taipei has been the capital of the Republic of China since December 1949.

==== 1950–1953: Korean War and U.S. intervention ====
At the start of 1950, U.S. President Harry S. Truman appeared to accept the idea that sovereignty over Taiwan was already settled when the United States Department of State stated that "In keeping with these [Cairo and Potsdam] declarations, Formosa was surrendered to Generalissimo Chiang-Kai Shek, and for the past four years, the United States and Other Allied Powers have accepted the exercise of Chinese authority over the Island." However, after the outbreak of the Korean War, Truman decided to "neutralize" Taiwan, claiming that it could otherwise trigger another world war. In June 1950, President Truman, who had previously given only passive support to Chiang Kai-shek and was prepared to see Taiwan fall into the hands of the CCP, vowed to stop the spread of communism and sent the U.S. Seventh Fleet into the Taiwan Strait to prevent the PRC from attacking Taiwan, but also to prevent the ROC from attacking mainland China. He then declared that "the determination of the future status of Formosa must await the restoration of security in the Pacific, a peace settlement with Japan, or consideration by the United Nations." President Truman later reaffirmed the position "that all questions affecting Formosa be settled by peaceful means as envisaged in the Charter of the United Nations" in his special message to Congress in July 1950. The PRC denounced his moves as flagrant interference in the internal affairs of China.

On 8 September 1950, President Truman ordered John Foster Dulles, then Foreign Policy Advisor to the U.S. Secretary of State, to carry out his decision on "neutralizing" Taiwan in drafting the Treaty of Peace with Japan (San Francisco Peace Treaty) of 1951. According to George H. Kerr's memoir Formosa Betrayed, Dulles devised a plan whereby Japan would first merely renounce its sovereignty over Taiwan without a recipient country to allow the sovereignty over Taiwan to be determined together by the United States, the United Kingdom, Soviet Union, and the Republic of China on behalf of other nations on the peace treaty. The question of Taiwan would be taken into the United Nations (of which the ROC was still part) if these four parties could not reach an agreement within one year.

==== 1952: Treaty of Peace with Japan (San Francisco) ====
In the 1951 San Francisco Treaty, Japan renounced its previous assertion of sovereignty over Taiwan. Academic Xu Guoqi observes that Japan's renouncing of sovereignty without "transferring its sovereignty to any political entity or state" resulted in a "continuing legal limbo that has created problems for Taiwan".

'Neither the PRC nor the ROC signed the treaty: notably absent at the peace conference was the ROC which was expelled from mainland China in December 1949 as a result of the Chinese Civil War and had retreated to Taiwan and the PRC, which was proclaimed on 1 October 1949, was also not invited. The lack of invitation was probably due to the dispute over which government was the legitimate government of China (which both governments claimed to be); however, Cold War considerations might have played a part as well. Some major governments represented in the San Francisco Conference, such as the UK and Soviet Union, had already established relations with the PRC, while others, such as the U.S. and Japan, still held relations with the ROC. Due to the absence of China from the treaty, the PRC considers the treaty to be illegal and illegitimate.

The UK at that time stated for the record that the San Francisco Peace Treaty "itself does not determine the future of these islands," and therefore, the UK, along with Australia and New Zealand, was happy to sign the peace treaty. One of the major reasons that the delegate from the Soviet Union gave for not signing the treaty was that: "The draft contains only a reference to the renunciation by Japan of its rights to these territories [Taiwan] but intentionally omits any mention of the further fate of these territories."

Article 25 of this treaty officially stipulated that only the Allied Powers defined in the treaty could benefit from this treaty. China was not listed as one of the Allied Powers; however, article 21 still provided limited benefits from Articles 10 and 14(a)2 for China. Japan's cession of Taiwan is unusual in that no recipient of Taiwan was stated as part of Dulles's plan of "neutralizing" Taiwan. The ROC protested its lack of invitation to the San Francisco Peace conference, to no avail.

==== 1952: Treaty of Taipei ====
Subsequently, the Treaty of Taipei was concluded between the ROC and Japan on 28 April 1952 (effective 5 August), where Japan essentially re-affirmed the terms of the San Francisco Peace Treaty and formalized the peace between the ROC and Japan. It also nullified all previous treaties made between China and Japan. Article 10 of the treaty specifies:

"For the purposes of the present Treaty, nationals of the Republic of China shall be deemed to include all the inhabitants and former inhabitants of Taiwan (Formosa) and Penghu (the Pescadores) and their descendants who are of the Chinese nationality in accordance with the laws and regulations which have been or may hereafter be enforced by the Republic of China in Taiwan (Formosa) and Penghu (the Pescadores)."

However, the ROC Minister of Foreign Affairs George Kung-ch'ao Yeh told the Legislative Yuan after signing the treaty that: "The delicate international situation makes it that they [Taiwan and Penghu] do not belong to us. Under present circumstances, Japan has no right to transfer [Taiwan] to us; nor can we accept such a transfer from Japan even if she so wishes." In July 1971, the U.S. State Department's position was, and remains: "As Taiwan and the Pescadores are not covered by any existing international disposition, sovereignty over the area is an unsettled question subject to future international resolution."

== Official positions ==
=== People's Republic of China ===
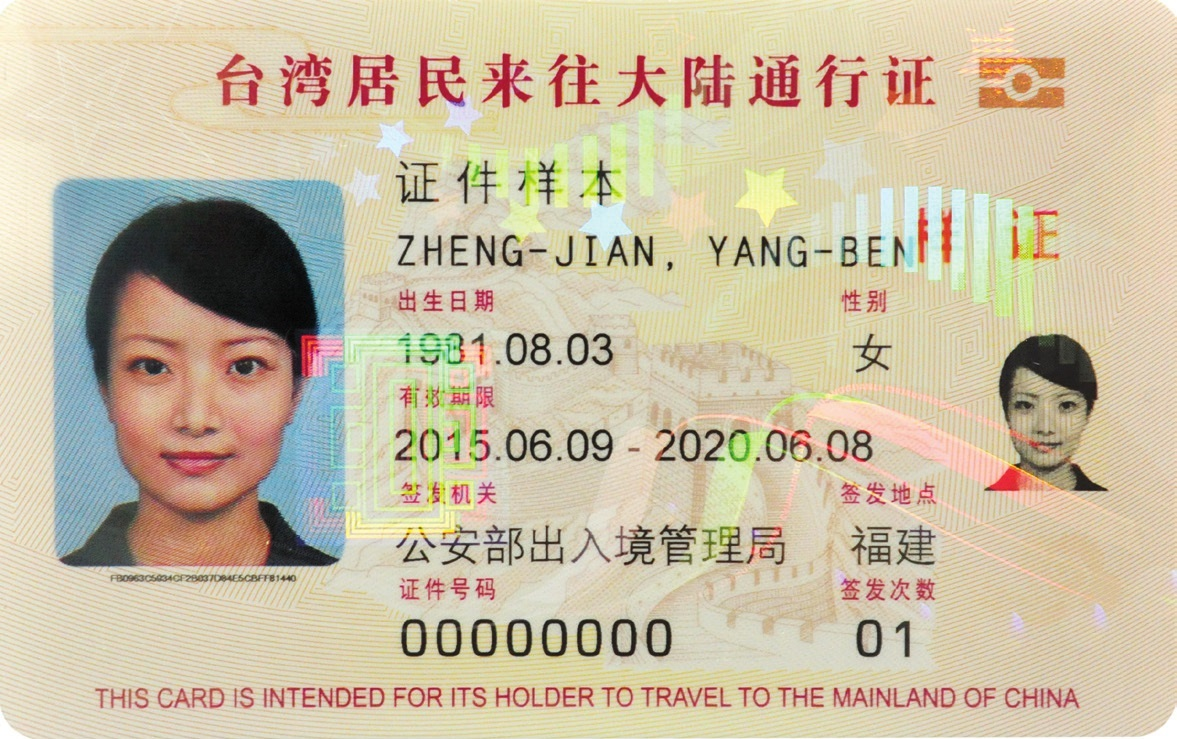
A PRC Mainland Travel Permit for Taiwan Residents. Permits allow ROC residents of Taiwan to enter mainland China. The PRC refuses to accept ROC passports.

Per its one-China principle, the official position of the People's Republic of China (PRC) is that it is the sole legitimate government representing all of China and that Taiwan an inalienable part of China. From the 1978 constitution until 1982, the constitution stated, "Taiwan is China's sacred territory. We are determined to liberate Taiwan and accomplish the great cause of reunifying the motherland." Since 1982, the current PRC constitution states, "Taiwan is a part of the sacred territory of the People's Republic of China. It is the lofty duty of the entire Chinese people, including our compatriots on Taiwan, to accomplish the great task of reunifying the motherland."

The PRC regards Taiwan as having been part of China since an expedition deployed by the Eastern Wu to Yizhou (allegedly claiming to be the present-day Taiwan) in 3rd century instead of the Qing Dynasty's annexation of Taiwan in 1683. The PRC views the Cairo and Potsdam declarations as legally binding instruments that settled Taiwan's status by establishing China's rightful recovery of the island. The PRC states that the ROC ceased to be a legitimate government upon the founding of the PRC on 1 October 1949 and that the PRC is the successor of the ROC as the sole legitimate government of China, with the right to rule Taiwan under the succession of states theory. Due to the absence of China from the agreement, the PRC rejects the Treaty of San Francisco, including its rulings on the sovereignty over Taiwan, as illegal and illegitimate. Furthermore, the PRC interprets the UN General Assembly Resolution 2758, which states "Recognizing that the representatives of the Government of the People's Republic of China are the only lawful representatives of China to the United Nations", as meaning that the PRC is recognized as having the sovereignty of all of China, including Taiwan. (Note: Established by Cairo Declaration, Potsdam Proclamation and Japanese Instrument of Surrender, according to the PRC's claim.)

In addition, the position of the PRC is that the ROC does not meet the fourth criterion of the Montevideo Convention, as it is recognized by only 11 UN member states and has been denied access to international organizations such as the UN. The PRC points out the fact that the Montevideo Convention was only signed by 19 states at the Seventh International Conference of American States. Thus the authority of the United Nations as well as UN Resolutions, should supersede the Montevideo Convention. However, "When speaking of statehood, one invariably refers to the 1933 Montevideo Convention on the Rights and Duties of States, 60 which, laying down what is now considered a rule of customary international law, states that "[t]he State as a person of international law should possess the following qualifications: (a) a permanent population; (b) a defined territory; (c) government; and (d) capacity to enter into relations with other States." Taiwan indeed satisfies all these criteria for statehood." Some would argue that Taiwan meets all the requirements of the Montevideo Convention. But to make such an argument, one has to reject China's claim of sovereignty over the territory of the Taiwan island, a claim that has been recognized by most states in the world.

The PRC has expressed its preference for peaceful unification under the one country, two systems formula, but does not rule out military force. The 2005 Anti-Secession Law authorizes possible military force for unification with Taiwan. The PRC government is unwilling to negotiate with the ROC government under any formulation other than the one China principle, although a more flexible definition of "one China" such as found in the 1992 Consensus is possible under PRC policy. The PRC currently considers acceptance of the 1992 Consensus as a prerequisite for any talks with the Taiwanese side. The PRC government considers the 1992 consensus a temporary measure to set aside sovereignty disputes and enable talks. As per the PRC's government and its supporters, believe that any issue involving China's sovereignty and territorial integrity must be decided by all 1.3 billion Chinese citizens instead of just the 23 million residents of Taiwan. The PRC government considers perceived violations of the one-China principle or inconsistencies with it, such as supplying the ROC with arms a violation of its rights to territorial integrity. Official PRC media outlets and officials often refer to Taiwan as "China's Taiwan Province" or simply "Taiwan, China", and pressure international organizations to use the term.

=== Republic of China (Taiwan) ===
Current Republic of China passport (Taiwan Passport)

The ROC argues that it maintains all the characteristics of a state and that it was not "replaced" or "succeeded" by the PRC because it has continued to exist long after the PRC's founding.

According to the Montevideo Convention of 1933, the most cited source for the definition of statehood, a state must possess a permanent population, a defined territory, a government, and the capacity to enter into relations with other states. Some argue that the ROC meets all these criteria. However, to make such an argument, one has to reject the PRC's claim of sovereignty over the territory of the Taiwan island. The PRC requires all other states that establish diplomatic relations with it not to challenge this claim in addition to severing said relations with the ROC. Most states have either officially recognized this claim or carefully worded their agreement ambiguously, such as the United States.

Both the original 1912 constitution and the 1923 draft version failed to list Taiwan as a part of the ROC since, at the time, Taiwan was a Japanese territory. It was only in the mid-1930s when both the CCP and KMT realized the future strategic importance of Taiwan that they altered their party positions to make a claim on Taiwan as a part of China. After losing the Civil War against the CCP in 1949, Chiang Kai-shek and the Nationalist Party fled to Taiwan and continued to maintain that their government represented all of China, i.e. both Taiwan and the mainland.

The position of most supporters of Taiwan independence is that the PRC is the government of "China" and that Taiwan is not part of China, defining "China" as only including Mainland China, Hong Kong, and Macau. Regarding the ROC, one ideology within Taiwan's independence regards the ROC as already an independent, sovereign state and seeks to amend the ROC's existing name, constitution, and existing framework to reflect the loss of ROC's mainland territory and transform the ROC into a Taiwan state; while another ideology of Taiwan independence regards the ROC as both a military government that has been administering the Taiwan island as a result of post-war military occupation on behalf of the allies of World War II since 1945, and a Chinese refugee regime currently in exile on Taiwan since 1949, and seeks to eliminate the ROC and establish a new independent Taiwan state.

The Democratic Progressive Party states that Taiwan has never been under the jurisdiction of the PRC and that the PRC does not exercise any hold over the 23 million Taiwanese on the island. On the other hand, the position of most Chinese unification supporters is that the Chinese Civil War is still not over since no peace agreement has ever been signed and that the current status is a state of ceasefire between two belligerents of "One China".

The position of the Republic of China has been that it is a de jure sovereign state. "Republic of China," according to the ROC government's definition, extended to both mainland China (Including Hong Kong and Macau) and the island of Taiwan.

In 1991, President Lee Teng-hui unofficially claimed that the government would no longer challenge the rule of the CCP in mainland China, although the ROC government under Kuomintang (KMT) rule actively maintained that it was the sole legitimate government of China. The Courts in Taiwan have never accepted President Lee's statement, primarily due to the reason that the (now defunct) National Assembly never officially changed the acclaimed national borders. Notably, the People's Republic of China claims that changing the national borders would be "a precursor to Taiwan independence". The task of changing the national borders now requires a constitutional amendment passed by the Legislative Yuan and ratified by a majority of all eligible ROC voters, which the PRC has implied would constitute grounds for military attack.

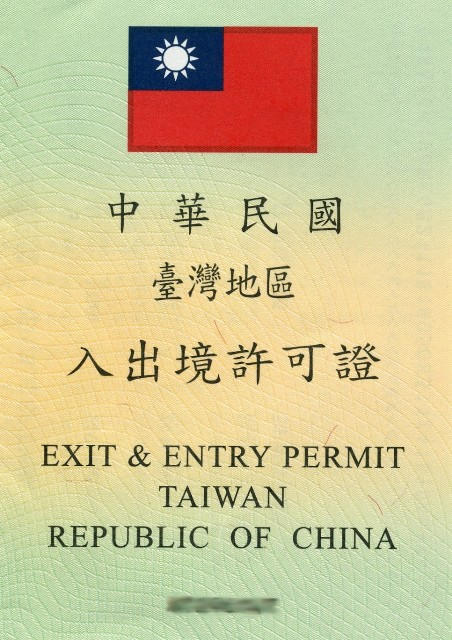
Exit and Entry Permit Taiwan, Republic of China. The Republic of China issues this permit to enable residents of mainland China, Hong Kong, and Macau to travel to Taiwan. The Republic of China refuses to accept People's Republic of China passports.

On the other hand, though the constitution of the Republic of China promulgated in 1946 does not state exactly what territory it includes, the draft of the constitution of 1925 did individually list the provinces of the Republic of China and Taiwan was not among them, since Taiwan was arguably de jure part of Japan as the result of the Treaty of Shimonoseki of 1895. The constitution also stipulated in Article I.4, that "the territory of the ROC is the original territory governed by it; unless authorized by the National Assembly, it cannot be altered."

However, in 1946, Sun Fo, son of Sun Yat-Sen and the minister of the Executive Yuan of the ROC, reported to the National Assembly that "there are two types of territory changes: 1. renouncing territory and 2. annexing new territory. The first example would be the independence of Mongolia, and the second example would be the reclamation of Taiwan. Both would be examples of territory changes." Japan renounced all rights to Taiwan in the Treaty of San Francisco in 1951 and the Treaty of Taipei of 1952 without an explicit recipient. While the ROC continuously ruled Taiwan after the government was directed to Taiwan by the General Order No. 1 (1945) to receive Japanese surrender, there has never been a meeting of the ROC National Assembly in making a territory change according to the ROC constitution. The explanatory memorandum to the constitution explained the omission of individually listing the provinces as opposed to the earlier drafts was an act of deliberate ambiguity: as the ROC government does not recognize the validity of the Treaty of Shimonoseki, based on Chiang Kai-shek's Denunciation of the treaty in the late 1930s, hence (according to this argument) the sovereignty of Taiwan was never disposed of by China. A ratification by the ROC National Assembly is, therefore, unnecessary.

The Additional Articles of the Constitution of the Republic of China have mentioned "Taiwan Province," and the now defunct National Assembly passed constitutional amendments that give the people of the "Free Area of the Republic of China", comprising the territories under its current jurisdiction, the sole right, until unification, to exercise the sovereignty of the Republic through elections of the President and the entire Legislature as well as through elections to ratify amendments to the ROC constitution. Also, Chapter I, Article 2 of the ROC constitution states that "The sovereignty of the Republic of China shall reside in the whole body of citizens." This suggests that the constitution implicitly admits that the sovereignty of the ROC is limited to the areas that it controls, even if there is no constitutional amendment that explicitly spells out the ROC's borders.

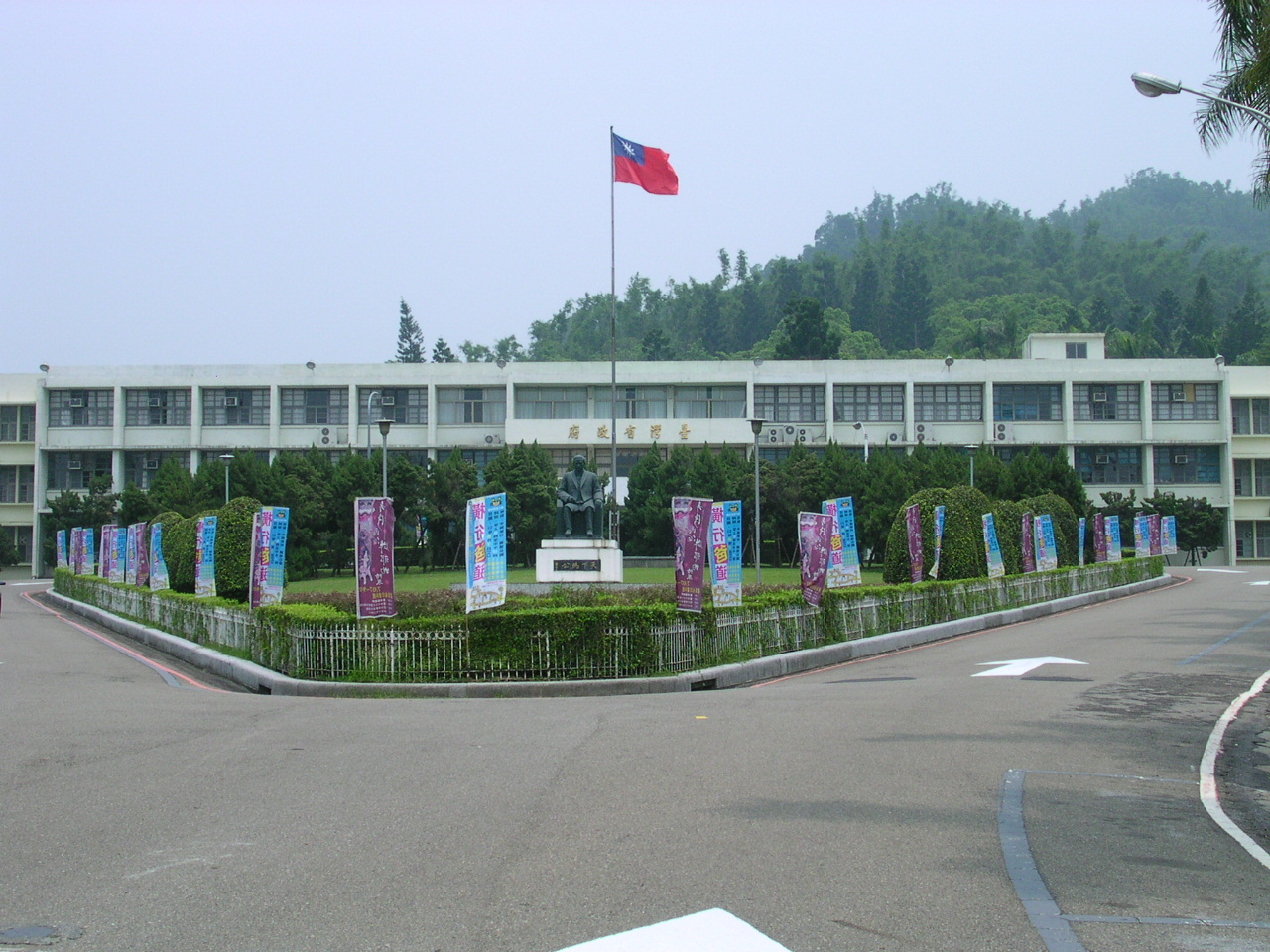
The building of the Provincial Government of the Taiwan Province of the Republic of China at Jhongsing Village

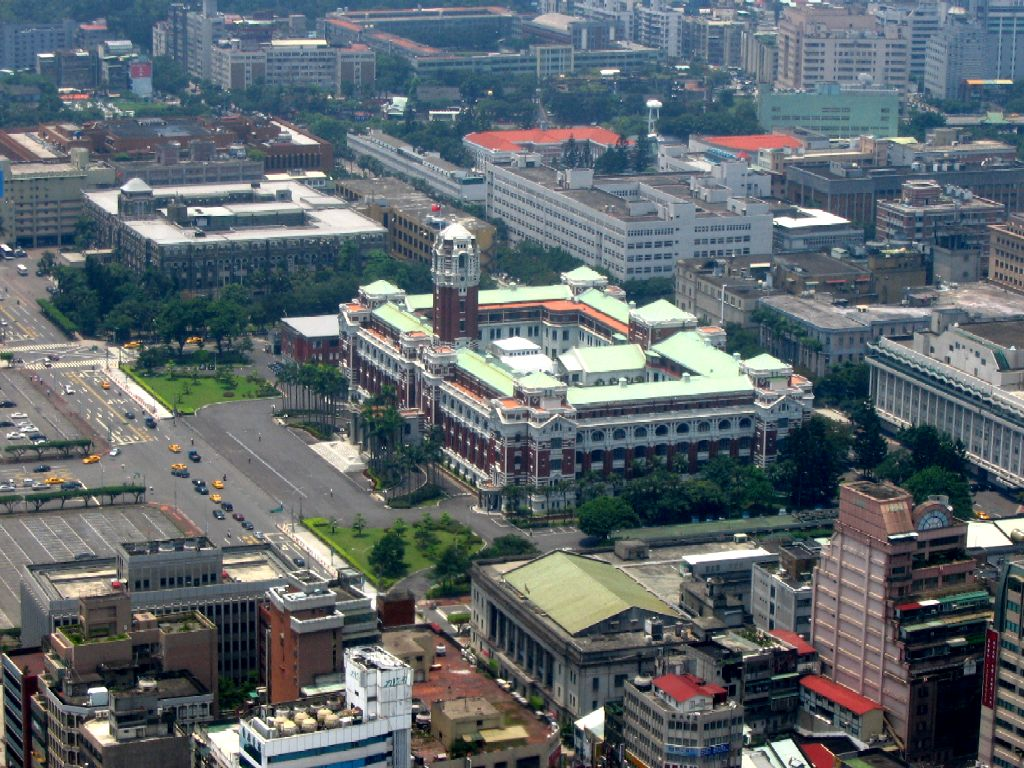
The Republic of China Presidential Office Building is located in the Zhongzheng District of Taipei.

In 1999, ROC President Lee Teng-hui proposed a two-state theory (兩國論) in which both the Republic of China and the People's Republic of China would acknowledge that they are two separate countries with a special diplomatic, cultural, and historic relationship. This, however, drew an angry reaction from the PRC who believed that Lee was covertly supporting Taiwan independence.

President Chen Shui-bian (2000 – May 2008) fully supported the idea that the "Republic of China is an independent, sovereign country" but held the view that the Republic of China is Taiwan and Taiwan does not belong to the People's Republic of China. This is suggested in his Four-stage Theory of the Republic of China. Due to the necessity of avoiding war with the PRC, however, President Chen had refrained from formally declaring Taiwan's independence. Government publications have implied that Taiwan refers to the ROC, and "China" refers to the PRC. After becoming chairman of the Democratic Progressive Party in July 2002, Chen appeared to move further than Lee's special two-state theory and in early August 2002, by putting forward the "one country on each side" concept, he stated that Taiwan may "go on its own Taiwanese road" and that "it is clear that the two sides of the straits are separate countries." These statements essentially eliminate any "special" factors in the relations and were strongly criticized by opposition parties in Taiwan. President Chen has repeatedly refused to endorse the One China Principle or the more "flexible" 1992 Consensus the PRC demands as a precursor to negotiations with the PRC. During Chen's presidency, there had not been any successful attempts to restart negotiations on a semi-official level.

In the 2008 ROC elections, the people delivered KMT's Ma Ying-jeou with an election win as well as a sizable majority in the legislature. President Ma, throughout his election campaign, maintained that he would accept the 1992 consensus and promote better relations with the PRC. In respect of Taiwan's political status, his policy was 1. he would not negotiate with the PRC on the subject of unification during his term; 2. he would never declare Taiwan's independence; and 3. he would not provoke the PRC into attacking Taiwan. He officially accepted the 1992 Consensus in his inauguration speech, which resulted in direct semi-official talks with the PRC, and this later led to the commencement of weekend direct charter flights between mainland China and Taiwan. President Ma also interprets the cross-strait relations as "special", "but not that between two nations". He later stated that mainland China is part of the territory of the Republic of China, and laws relating to international relations are not applicable to the relations between mainland China and Taiwan, as they are parts of a state.

In 2016, Tsai Ing-Wen of the DPP won a landslide victory in the presidential election and was later re-elected for the second term in 2020. She refused to agree that Taiwan is part of China and also rejected the one country, two systems model proposed by the PRC. Instead, she said that "Republic of China, Taiwan" already is an independent country and that Beijing must "face reality".

=== Other countries and international organizations ===
Voting situation in the UN general assembly respect to resolution 2758 (1971) Vote in favor Vote against Non-Voting Abstention Non-UN-members or dependencies

Because of anti-communist sentiment at the start of the Cold War, the Republic of China was initially recognized as the sole legitimate government of China by the United Nations and most Western nations. On 9 January 1950, the Israeli government extended recognition to the People's Republic of China. United Nations General Assembly Resolution 505, passed on 1 February 1952, considered the CCP to be rebels against the Republic of China.

However, the 1970s saw a switch in diplomatic recognition from the ROC to the PRC. On 25 October 1971, Resolution 2758 was passed by the UN General Assembly, which "decides to restore all its rights to the People's Republic of China and to recognize the representatives of its Government as the only legitimate representatives of China to the United Nations, and to expel forthwith the representatives of Chiang Kai-shek from the place which they unlawfully occupy at the United Nations and in all the organizations related to it." Multiple attempts by the Republic of China to rejoin the UN, no longer to represent all of China but just the people of the territories it governs, have not made it past committee, largely due to diplomatic maneuvering by the PRC, which claims Resolution 2758 has settled the matter. (Note: See: China and the United Nations) The resolution was cited by the General Assembly as acknowledging that Taiwan is part of China in 2007, when the "Taiwan Province of China" was rejected to join the UN under the name "Taiwan".

The PRC refuses to maintain diplomatic relations with any nation that recognizes the ROC, but does not object to nations conducting economic, cultural, and other such exchanges with Taiwan that do not imply diplomatic relations. Therefore, multiple nations that have diplomatic relations with Beijing maintain quasi-diplomatic offices in Taipei. Similarly, the government in Taiwan maintains quasi-diplomatic offices in most nations under various names, most commonly as the Taipei Economic and Cultural Office.

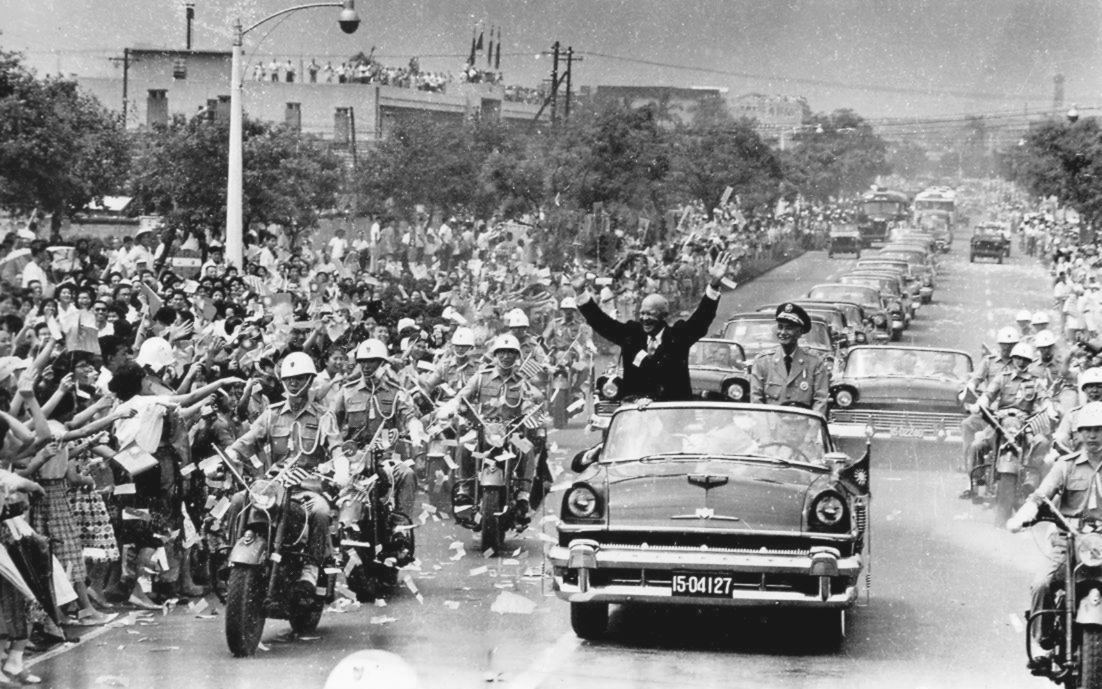
With President Chiang Kai-shek, the U.S. President Dwight D. Eisenhower waved hands to Taiwanese people during his visit to Taipei, Taiwan in June 1960.

The United States is one of the main allies of Taiwan and since the Taiwan Relations Act passed in 1979, the United States has sold arms and provided military training to Taiwan's Republic of China Armed Forces. This situation continues to be a point of contention for the People's Republic of China, which considers US involvement disruptive to the stability of the region. In January 2010, the Obama administration announced its intention to sell $6.4 billion worth of military hardware to Taiwan. As a consequence, China threatened the United States with economic sanctions and warned that their cooperation on international and regional issues could suffer. The official position of the United States is that China is expected to "use no force or threat[en] to use force against Taiwan" and that Taiwan is to "exercise prudence in managing all aspects of Cross-Strait relations." Both are to refrain from performing actions or espousing statements "that would unilaterally alter Taiwan's status." The United States maintains the American Institute in Taiwan.

The United States, the United Kingdom, Japan, India, Pakistan, and Canada have in some form adopted the One China policy, under which the People's Republic of China is theoretically the sole legitimate government of China. However, the United States and Japan acknowledge rather than recognize the PRC position that Taiwan is part of China. In the case of the United Kingdom and Canada, bilateral written agreements state that the two respective parties take note of Beijing's position but do not use the word support. The UK government's position that "the future of Taiwan be decided peacefully by the peoples of both sides of the Strait" has been stated several times. Despite the PRC's claim that the United States opposes Taiwanese independence, the United States takes advantage of the subtle difference between "oppose" and "does not support". In fact, a substantial majority of the statements Washington has made say that it "does not support Taiwan independence" instead of saying that it "opposes" independence. Thus, the US currently does not take a position on the political outcome, except for one explicit condition that there be a peaceful resolution to the differences between the two sides of the Taiwan Strait. The United States bi-partisan position is that it does not recognize the PRC's claim over Taiwan, and considers Taiwan's status as unsettled.

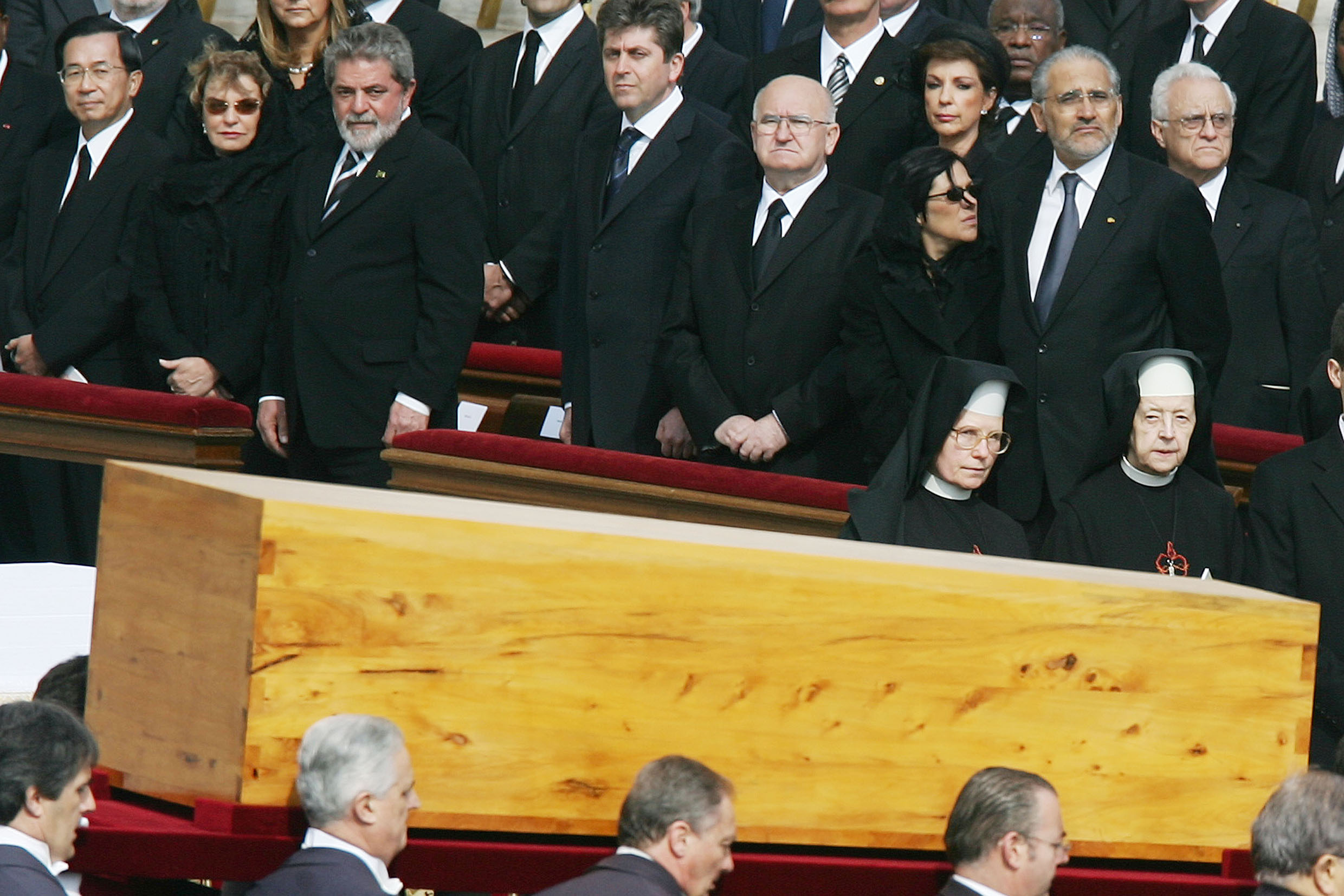
President Chen Shui-bian (far left) attended the funeral of Pope John Paul II in 2005. As the Holy See's recognized head of state of China, Chen was seated in the front row (in French alphabetical order) beside the first lady and president of Brazil.

The ROC maintains formal diplomatic relations with 11 UN member states, mostly in Central America, the Caribbean, Africa, and Oceania. Additionally, the Holy See also recognizes the ROC, a largely non-Christian/Catholic state, due partly to the Catholic Church's traditional opposition to communism and also to protest what it sees as the PRC's suppression of the Catholic faith in mainland China. However, Vatican diplomats were engaged in talks with PRC politicians at the time of Pope John Paul II's death, with a view towards improving relations between the two countries. When asked, one Vatican diplomat suggested that relations with Taiwan might prove "expendable" should PRC be willing to engage in positive diplomatic relations with the Holy See. Under Pope Benedict XVI, the Vatican and PRC have shown greater interest in establishing ties, including the appointment of pro-Vatican bishops and the Pope canceling a planned visit from the 14th Dalai Lama.

As of at least 2024, the trend in East Asian governments is not to generally discuss the issue of Taiwan's political status. Academics Xinru Ma and David C. Kang write that when East Asian countries do, "it is often to caution the United States from getting too far ahead of where even the Taiwanese themselves are."

As of January 2023, fifty-one countries recognize Taiwan as a part of China: Albania, Andorra, Angola, Antigua and Barbuda, Armenia, Azerbaijan, the Bahamas, Belarus, Bolivia, Bosnia and Herzegovina, Botswana, Costa Rica, Croatia, the Czech Republic, Dominica, the Dominican Republic, Eritrea, Estonia, France, Georgia, Guinea-Bissau, Israel, Jordan, Kazakhstan, Kyrgyzstan, Latvia, Lesotho, Lithuania, the Maldives, Moldova, Montenegro, Namibia, Nicaragua, Niger, Niue, Poland, Portugal, Romania, Serbia, Slovakia, Slovenia, South Africa, South Sudan, Sudan, Switzerland, Tajikistan, Timor-Leste, Tonga, Turkmenistan, Uganda, and Vietnam. Other countries have not committed to or have not made public statements indicating a position on the question.

== Legal arguments ==
The proclamation of Taiwan Retrocession Day on 25 October 1945 by the ROC (when the PRC had not yet been founded) was entirely uncontested. Had another party been sovereign over Taiwan, that party would have had a period of years in which to protest, and its failure to do so represents cession of rights in the manner of prescription. The lack of protest by any non-Chinese government persists to this day, further strengthening this argument.

Even if the San Francisco Peace Treaty were determinative, it should be interpreted in a manner consistent with the Potsdam and Cairo Declarations. Therefore, sovereignty would still have been transferred to China. Applying the principle of uti possidetis with regard to the Treaty of Taipei would grant Taiwan's sovereignty to the ROC, as it is undisputed that at the coming into force of the treaty, the ROC controlled Taiwan. Taiwan was terra derelicta and, after 1951, became Chinese territory through appropriation. According to barrister D. P. O'Connell, this theory of acquisition by occupation is more inherently consistent than several other theories on Taiwan's status.

The San Francisco Peace Treaty's omission of "China" as a participant was not an accident of history, but reflected the status that the Republic of China had failed to maintain its original position as the de jure and de facto government of the "whole China". By fleeing to Taiwan island in December 1949, the ROC government has then arguably become a government in exile.

== Media coverage ==
Many political leaders who have maintained some form of the One-China Policy have committed slips of the tongue in referring to Taiwan as a country or as the Republic of China. United States presidents Ronald Reagan and George W. Bush have been known to have referred to Taiwan as a country during their terms of office. Although near the end of his term as U.S. Secretary of State, Colin Powell said that Taiwan is not a state, he referred to Taiwan as the Republic of China twice during a testimony to the U.S. Senate Foreign Relations Committee on 9 March 2001. In the People's Republic of China Premier Zhu Rongji's farewell speech to the National People's Congress, Zhu accidentally referred to Mainland China and Taiwan as two countries. Zhu says in his speech at MIT University on 15 April 1999, "These raw materials and the components are mainly imported from Japan, [Korea], Taiwan, Hong Kong, Singapore, while the value-added parts in China is very, very insignificant. That is to say, Chinese exports to the United States actually represent a transfer of the exports to the United States by the above-mentioned countries and the regions that I mentioned." There are also those from the PRC who informally refer to Taiwan as a country. South Africa delegates once referred to Taiwan as the "Republic of Taiwan" during Lee Teng-hui's term as President of the ROC. In 2002, Michael Bloomberg, the mayor of New York City, referred to Taiwan as a country. Most recently, former U.S. Secretary of Defense Donald Rumsfeld stated in a local Chinese newspaper in California in July 2005 that Taiwan is "a sovereign nation". The People's Republic of China discovered the statement about three months after it was made.

In a controversial speech on 4 February 2006, Japanese Foreign Minister Taro Aso called Taiwan a country with high education levels because of previous Japanese colonial rule over the island. One month later, he told a Japanese parliamentary committee that "[Taiwan's] democracy is considerably matured and liberal economics is deeply ingrained, so it is a law-abiding country. In various ways, it is a country that shares a sense of values with Japan." At the same time, he admitted that "I know there will be a problem with calling [Taiwan] a country".

Taiwan was classified as a province of the People's Republic of China in the Apple Maps application in 2013; searches for "Taiwan" were changed automatically to "China Taiwan province" in Simplified Chinese, prompting the Taiwanese Ministry of Foreign Affairs to demand a correction from Apple.

On 24 October 2021, Last Week Tonight with John Oliver aired an episode about Taiwan after a petition on Change.org in June invited Oliver to discuss Taiwan's complex political situation and its international significance. In the segment, a brief but comprehensive history of Taiwan is provided with notable points such as occupation by the Dutch, Spanish, Manchu-Qing dynasty, and Japanese; path to becoming a prominent Asian democracy; and the strained relation with modern-day China. Oliver also highlighted Taiwan as the birthplace of bubble tea, apologies made by John Cena after referring to Taiwan as a country, and the hesitation of international organizations like the World Health Organization and the Olympics in properly representing Taiwan. He concluded the episode by emphasizing Taiwanese citizens' point of view and their right to determine the country's own future.

To avoid controversy, multiple mainstream American media outlets refer to Taiwan as an island or democracy.

== Taiwanese public opinion ==
Public opinion in Taiwan regarding relations with the PRC is notoriously difficult to gauge, as poll results tend to be extremely sensitive to how the questions are phrased and what options are given, and there is a tendency by all political parties to spin the results to support their point of view.

According to a November 2005 poll from the Mainland Affairs Council, 37.7% of people living in the ROC favor maintaining the status quo until a decision can be made in the future, 18.4% favors maintaining the status quo indefinitely, 14% favors maintaining the status quo until eventual independence, 12% favors maintaining the status quo until eventual unification, 10.3% favors independence as soon as possible, and 2.1% favors unification as soon as possible. According to the same poll, 78.3% are opposed to the "One Country, Two Systems" model, which was used for Hong Kong and Macau, while 10.4% is in favor. However, it is essential to consider current events or newly developing positions when determining public opinion in order to maintain accuracy and efficiency, especially when it comes to conducting foreign policy and determining Taiwan's political status and hopeful eventual independence. For example, "Large jumps in the proportion of independence supporters after China's missile test in mid-1996 (from 13% in February to 21% in March) and Lee Teng-hui's "special state-to-state" speech in mid-1999 (from 15% in March to 28% in August) suggest that the cross-Strait tension influenced the Taiwanese to become more independence-minded". According to a June 2008 poll from a Taiwanese mainstream media TVBS, 58% of people living in Taiwan favor maintaining the status quo, 19% favors independence, and 8% favors unification. According to the same poll, if status quo is not an option and the ones who were surveyed must choose between "Independence" or "Unification", 65% are in favor of independence while 19% would opt for unification. The same poll also reveals that, in terms of self-identity, when the respondents are not told that a Taiwanese person can also be a Chinese person, 68% of the respondents identify themselves as "Taiwanese" while 18% would call themselves "Chinese". However, when the respondents are told that duo identity is an option, 45% of the respondents identify themselves as "Taiwanese only", 4% of the respondents call themselves "Chinese only" while another 45% of the respondents call themselves "both Taiwanese as well as Chinese". Furthermore, when it comes to preference in which national identity to be used in international organizations, 54% of people in the survey indicated that they prefer "Taiwan", and only 25% of the people voted for "Chinese Taipei".

According to an October 2008 poll from the Mainland Affairs Council, on the question of Taiwan's status, 36.17% of respondents favor maintaining the status quo until a decision can be made in the future, 25.53% favors maintaining the status quo indefinitely, 12.49% favors maintaining the status quo until eventual independence, 4.44% favors maintaining the status quo until eventual unification, 14.80% favors independence as soon as possible, and 1.76% favors unification as soon as possible. In the same poll, on the question of the PRC government's attitude towards the ROC government, 64.85% of the respondents consider the PRC government hostile or very hostile, 24.89% consider the PRC government friendly or very friendly, while 10.27% did not express an opinion. On the question of the PRC government's attitude towards the people in Taiwan, 45.98% of the respondents consider the PRC government hostile or very hostile, 39.6% consider the PRC government friendly or very friendly, while 14.43% did not express an opinion.

In May 2009, Taiwan's (Republic of China) Department of the Interior published a survey examining whether people in Taiwan see themselves as Taiwanese, Chinese, or both. 64.6% see themselves as Taiwanese, 11.5% as Chinese, 18.1% as both, and 5.8% were unsure.

According to a December 2009 poll from a Taiwanese mainstream media TVBS, if status quo is not an option and the ones who were surveyed must choose between "Independence" or "Unification", 68% are in favor of independence while 13% would opt for unification.

A June 2013 poll conducted by DPP showed that 77.6% consider themselves as Taiwanese. On the independence-unification issue, the survey found that 25.9 percent said they support unification, 59 percent support independence, and 10.3 percent prefer the "status quo." When asked whether Taiwan and China are parts of one country, the party said the survey found 78.4 percent disagree, while 15 percent agreed. As for whether Taiwan and China are two districts in one country, 70.6 percent disagree, while 22.8 percent agree, the survey showed. When asked which among four descriptions—"one country on each side," "a special state-to-state relationship," "one country, two areas," and "two sides are of one country"—they find the most acceptable, 54.9 percent said "one country on each side," 25.3 percent chose "a special state-to-state relationship," 9.8 percent said "one country, two areas", and 2.5 percent favor "two sides are of one country," the survey showed.

A June 2023 poll conducted by the National Chengchi University showed 62.8% identified as Taiwanese, 2.5% as Chinese, and 30.5% as both. Regarding independence, 32.1% indicated status quo forever, 28.6% wanted to decide later, 21.4% said status quo moving toward independence, and 5.8% said status quo moving toward unification.

== Geopolitical significance ==
The Taiwan Strait is a vital maritime trade route, handling trillions of dollars' worth of trade that pass through the sea between mainland China and Taiwan. The economy of Taiwan is also vital to the stability of the global economy, producing over 90 percent of the most cutting-edge semiconductor chips used in smartphones, data centers, and advanced military equipment. Disruptions to the supply of these technologies could wipe trillions of dollars from global GDP. The United States has considered Taiwan as a vital component of its island-chain strategy to prevent PRC influence from extending into the Indo-Pacific, and potentially threatening Guam, Hawaii and the West Coast of the United States. China, on the other hand, views the strategy as a form of containment that seeks to prevent China's rise to a superpower and accuses the U.S. of using Taiwan to overthrow its political system.

== Military operations ==
Intermittent clashes between the two sides occurred throughout the 1950s and 1960s, including the First and Second Taiwan Strait crises.

=== Third Taiwan Strait crisis ===
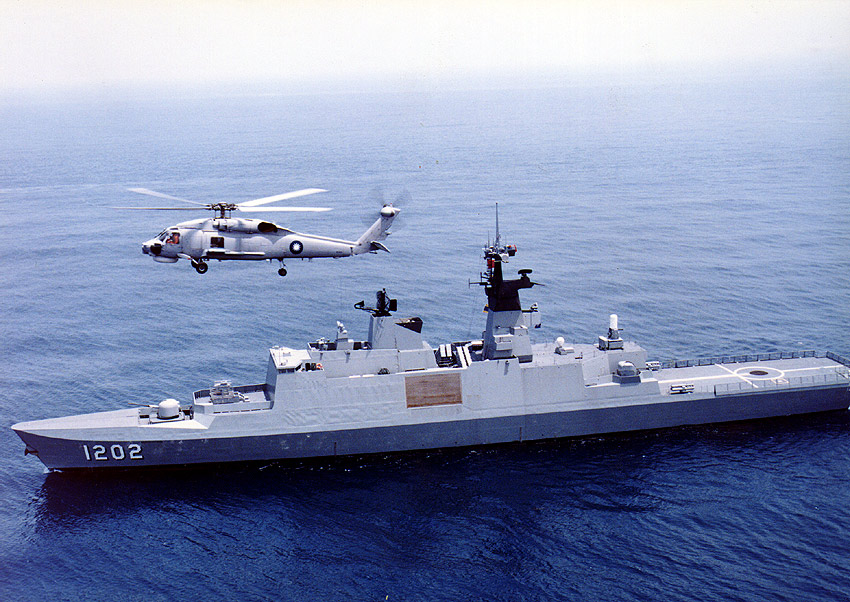
ROCS Kang Ding-class frigate with S-70C helicopter

In 1996, the PRC began conducting military exercises near Taiwan, and launched several ballistic missiles over the island. The saber-rattling was done in response to the possible re-election of then President Lee Teng-hui. The United States, under President Clinton, sent two aircraft carrier battle groups to the region, reportedly sailing them into the Taiwan Strait. The PRC, unable to track the ships' movements, and probably unwilling to escalate the conflict, quickly backed down. The event had little impact on the outcome of the election, since none of Lee's contestants were strong enough to defeat him, but it is widely believed that the PRC's aggressive acts, far from intimidating the Taiwanese population, gave Lee a boost that pushed his share of votes over 50 percent. This was an aggressively serious escalation in response to the Taiwan Strait and the ongoing conflict between China and Taiwan. This hostile reaction by mainland China is the result of China implementing Putnam's Two-level game theory. This theory suggests that the chief negotiator of a state must balance and abide by both international and domestic interests, and in some cases must focus more on domestic interests. In the case of China, "a serious escalation of tensions in the Taiwan Strait and raised the specter of war—one that could conceivably draw in the United States. This turn of events is either the result of pressure by hawkish, hardline soldiers on moderate, mild-mannered statesmen for a tougher, more aggressive response to Taiwan, or a strong consensus among both civilian and military leaders in the Politburo."

=== PRC's conditions on a future military intervention ===
Notwithstanding, the PRC government has issued triggers for an immediate war with Taiwan, most notably via its controversial Anti-Secession Law of 2005. These conditions are:

- if events occur leading to the "separation" of Taiwan from China in any name, or
- if a major event occurs which would lead to Taiwan's "separation" from China, or
- if all possibility of peaceful unification is lost.

It has been interpreted that these criteria encompass the scenario of Taiwan developing nuclear weapons (see main article Taiwan and weapons of mass destruction also Timeline of the Republic of China's nuclear program).

The third condition has especially caused a stir in Taiwan as the term "indefinitely" is open to interpretation. It has also been viewed by some as meaning that preserving the ambiguous status quo is not acceptable to the PRC, although the PRC stated on a number of occasions that there is no explicit timetable for unification.

Concern over a formal declaration of de jure Taiwan independence is a strong impetus for the military buildup between Taiwan and mainland China. The former US Bush administration publicly declared that given the status quo, it would not aid Taiwan if it were to declare independence unilaterally.

According to the US Department of Defense report "Military and Security Developments Involving the People's Republic of China 2011", the conditions that mainland China has warned that may cause the use of force have varied. They have included "a formal declaration of Taiwan independence; undefined moves "toward independence"; foreign intervention in Taiwan's internal affairs; indefinite delays in the resumption of cross-Strait dialogue on unification; Taiwan's acquisition of nuclear weapons; and, internal unrest on Taiwan. Article 8 of the March 2005 "Anti-Secession Law" states Beijing would resort to "non-peaceful means" if "secessionist forces ... cause the fact of Taiwan's secession from China," if "major incidents entailing Taiwan's secession" occur, or if "possibilities for peaceful reunification" are exhausted".

=== Balance of power ===
The possibility of war, the close geographic proximity of ROC-controlled Taiwan and PRC-controlled mainland China, and the resulting flare-ups that occur every few years, conspire to make this one of the most watched focal points in the Pacific. Both sides have chosen to have a strong naval presence. However, naval strategies between both powers greatly shifted in the 1980s and 1990s, while the ROC assumed a more defensive attitude by building and buying frigates and missile destroyers, and the PRC a more aggressive posture by developing long-range cruise missiles and supersonic surface-to-surface missiles.

Although the People's Liberation Army Air Force is considered large, most of its fleet consists of older generation J-7 fighters (localized MiG-21s and Mig-21BIs), raising doubts over the PLAAF's ability to control Taiwan's airspace in the event of a conflict. Since mid-1990s, PRC has been purchasing, and later localizing, SU-27 based fighters. These Russian fighters, as well as their Chinese J11A variants, are currently over 170 in number, and have increased the effectiveness of PLAAF's Beyond Visual Range (BVR) capabilities. The introduction of 60 new-generation J10A fighters is anticipated to increase the PLAAF's firepower. PRC's acquisition of Russian Su30MKKs further enhanced the PLAAF's air-to-ground support ability. In October 2017, Chinese media reported that Chinese stealth aircraft Chengdu J-20 began production, which gave the PLAAF a significant advantage in air superiority over the ROC Air Force. The ROC's air force, on the other hand, relies on Taiwan's fourth generation fighters, consisting of 150 US-built F-16 Fighting Falcons, approximately 60 French-built Mirage 2000-5s, and approximately 130 locally developed IDFs (Indigenous Defense Fighters). All of these ROC fighter jets are able to conduct BVR combat missions with BVR missiles, but the level of technology in mainland Chinese fighters is catching up. Also, the United States Defense Intelligence Agency has reported that few of Taiwan's 400 total fighters are operationally capable.

In 2003, the ROC purchased four missile destroyers—the former Kidd class, and expressed a strong interest in the Arleigh Burke class. But with the growth of the PRC navy and air force, some doubt that the ROC could withstand a determined invasion attempt from mainland China in the future. These concerns have led to a view in certain quarters that Taiwanese independence, if it is to be implemented, should be attempted as early as possible, while the ROC still has the capacity to defend itself in an all-out military conflict. Over the past three decades, estimates of how long the ROC can withstand a full-scale invasion from across the Strait without any outside help have decreased from three months to only six days. Given such estimates, the US Navy has continued practicing "surging" its carrier groups, giving it the experience necessary to respond quickly to an attack on Taiwan. The US also collects data on the PRC's military deployments, through the use of spy satellites, for example. Early surveillance may effectively identify PRC's massive military movement, which may imply PRC's preparation for a military assault against Taiwan.

Naturally, war contingencies are not being planned in a vacuum. In 1979, the United States Congress passed the Taiwan Relations Act, a law generally interpreted as mandating U.S. defense of Taiwan in the event of an attack from mainland China (the Act is applied to Taiwan and Penghu, but not to Kinmen or Matsu, which are usually considered to be part of mainland China). The United States maintains the world's largest permanent fleet in the Pacific Region near Taiwan. The Seventh Fleet, operating primarily out of various bases in Japan, is a powerful naval contingent built upon the world's only permanently forward-deployed aircraft carrier USS George Washington. Although the stated purpose of the fleet is not Taiwanese defense, it can be safely assumed from past actions that it is one of the reasons why the fleet is stationed in those waters. It is written into the strategy of the United States department of defense within this region that, "First, we are strengthening our military capacity to ensure the United States can successfully deter conflict and coercion and respond decisively when needed. Second, we are working together with our allies and partners from Northeast Asia to the Indian Ocean to build their capacity to address potential challenges in their waters and across the region. Third, we are leveraging military diplomacy to build greater transparency, reduce the risk of miscalculation or conflict, and promote shared maritime rules of the road."

Starting in 2000, Japan renewed its defense obligations with the US and embarked on a rearmament program, partly in response to fears that Taiwan might be invaded. Some analysts believed that the PRC could launch preemptive strikes on military bases in Japan to deter US and Japanese forces from coming to the ROC's aid. Japanese strategic planners also see an independent Taiwan as vital, not only because the ROC controls valuable shipping routes, but also because its capture by PRC would make Japan more vulnerable. During World War II, the US invaded the Philippines, but another viable target to enable direct attacks on Japan would have been Taiwan (then known as Formosa). However, critics of the preemptive strike theory assert that the PRC would be loath to give Japan and the US such an excuse to intervene.

The United States Department of Defense in a 2011 report stated that the primary mission of the PRC military is a possible military conflict with Taiwan, including also possible US military assistance. Although the risk of a crisis in the short-term is low, in the absence of new political developments, Taiwan will likely dominate future military modernization and planning. However, also other priorities are becoming increasingly prominent and possible due to increasing military resources. A number of mainland China's most advanced military systems are stationed in areas opposite Taiwan. The rapid military modernization is continually changing the military balance of power towards mainland China.

A 2008 report by the RAND Corporation analyzing a theoretical 2020 attack by mainland China on Taiwan suggested that the US would likely not be able to defend Taiwan. Cruise missile developments may enable China to partially or completely destroy or make inoperative US aircraft carriers and bases in the Western Pacific. New Chinese radars will likely be able to detect US stealth aircraft and China is acquiring stealthy and more effective aircraft. The reliability of US beyond-visual-range missiles as a mean to achieve air superiority is questionable and largely unproven.

In 2021, Admiral Phillip Davidson said in a Senate Armed Services Committee hearing that China could take military action on Taiwan some time in the next 6 years. A spokesperson for China's foreign ministry later responded stating that Davidson was trying to "hype up China's military threat."

In the wake of US House Speaker Nancy Pelosi's 2022 visit to Taiwan, China increased its air and naval crossings of the Taiwan Strait median line, an unofficial understanding between the two sides when relations are good. In 2024 China moved civil aviation routes closer to the line, which is expected to further "squeeze" the airspace controlled by Taiwan within 12 nautical miles of its coast.

== See also ==
- Foreign relations of Taiwan
- History of the Republic of China
- Secession in China
- Second Republic of China (Taiwan)
