= Yehshan Building =

Building in Longtan, Taoyuan City, Taiwan

- 葉山樓
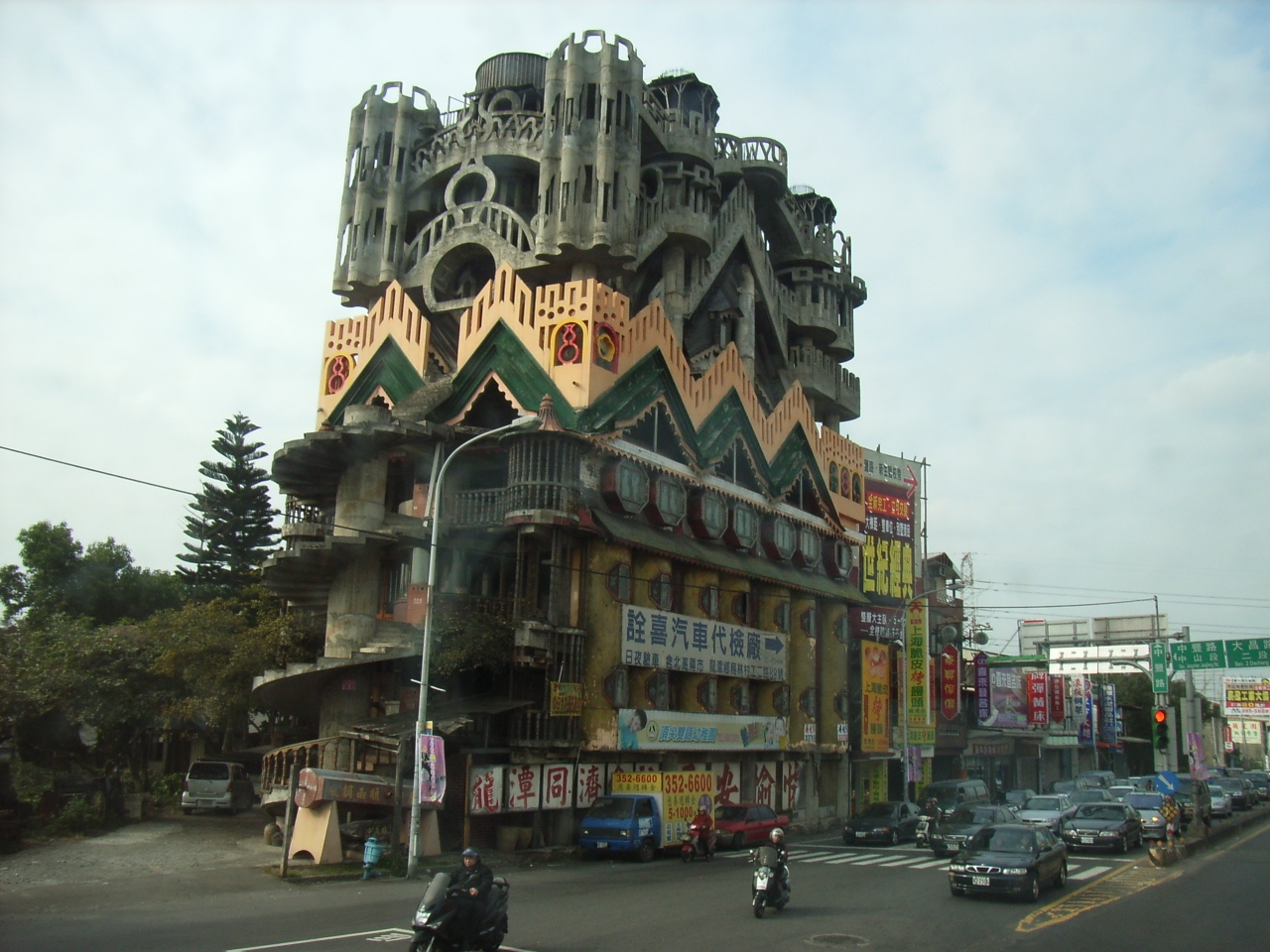
- Interactive map of the Yehshan Building area

General information
- Location: Longtan, Taoyuan City, Taiwan
- Coordinates: 24°52′11.5″N 121°12′48.8″E
- Cost: NT$60 million

Technical details
- Grounds: 330 m^{2}

Design and construction
- Architect: Yeh Fa-pao

The Yehshan Building (traditional Chinese: 葉山樓; simplified Chinese: 叶山楼; pinyin: Yèshān Lóu) or Weird Building (traditional Chinese: 怪怪樓; simplified Chinese: 怪怪楼; pinyin: Guàiguài Lóu) is a building in Longtan District, Taoyuan City, Taiwan.

== History ==
The construction of the building started by the owner Yeh Fa-pao (葉發苞) who initially purchased a 330 m^{2} piece of land for a price of NT$3 million. After three decades, the building had nine floors. It was constructed in three stages, which were wood frames installation, reinforced concrete pouring and exterior decoration installations.

== Architecture ==
The building was planned and designed by Yeh. It was constructed at a cost of NT$60 million.
