= Timeline of Taiwan's nuclear program =

The nuclear program of the Republic of China can be represented as a Timeline of the Taiwan-based Republic of China's nuclear program.

Date	Event
1956	National Tsinghua University in Taiwan is reestablished where the university built the nation's first research nuclear reactor and began training atomic energy specialists.
1964	Taiwan launched a nuclear weapons program after the first Chinese nuclear test in October 1964.
1964	The military Chungshan Institute of Science and Technology developed the "Hsin Chu Program" which included the purchase of a heavy-water reactor, a heavy-water production plant, and a plutonium separation plant.
1968	Taiwan signed the Non-proliferation Treaty
1968	The Institute of Nuclear Energy Research (INER) established as the sole national institute in Taiwan specialized in nuclear technology R&D programs.
1969	INER purchased a small (40 MWT) heavy-water research reactor from Canada began work on it in September and finished it in April 1973 Canada furnished Taiwan with heavy water and 25 tons of natural Uranium.
1969	Work began on other INER facilities, a plant to produce natural uranium fuel, a reprocessing facility, and a plutonium chemistry laboratory
1970	Work began on a fuel reprocessing facility at the "Hot Laboratory"
1971	On Oct. 25 Taiwan is "expelled" from the United Nations and IAEA. The seat is given to the People's Republic of China as the sole representative of China.
1972	The fuel-fabrication plant began operating in 1972 or 1973, using a supply of natural uranium from South Africa, It was expected to produce about 20–30 metric tons of fuel a year roughly twice as much as the research reactor required.
1974	The US CIA stated "Taipei conducts its small nuclear program with a weapon option clearly in mind, and it will be in a position to fabricate a nuclear device after five years or so."
1976	In September President Chiang Ching-kuo stated that Taiwan would not develop reprocessing facilities or engage in reprocessing.
1978	On Dec. 15 the United States announces it will terminate its diplomatic relations with Taiwan on Jan. 1, 1979.
1987	On July 15 the end of martial law is declared in Taiwan.
1988	Taiwan shut down the TRR reactor.
1988	INER became a part of the Atomic Energy Council.
1995	President Lee Teng-hui told the national assembly: "We should restudy the question [of nuclear weapons] from a long-term point of view." He added: "Everyone knows we had had the plan before."
1995	A few days later, Lee states that Taiwan "has the ability to develop nuclear weapons, but will definitely not" develop them.
2000	On Feb. 21 China issues a White Paper warning more explicitly than before that Taiwan's further heel dragging on reunification–let alone any declaration of independence–could force China to take "drastic measures."
2004	Speculation over a covert Taiwanese nuclear program intensified on October 13, after the Associated Press reported that IAEA officials disclosed they had evidence that Taiwan experimented with plutonium during the early 1980s.
2006	The US Defense Department mistakenly shipped secret nuclear missile fuses to Taiwan and did not learn that the items were missing until 2008

== See also ==
- Taiwan and weapons of mass destruction
