= Sky Horse =

Taiwanese ballistic missile

Sky Horse (Chinese: 天馬飛彈; pinyin: Tiānmǎ Fēidàn) is a ballistic missile developed secretly by Taiwan in the late 1970s, with a considerable number being produced.

== Development ==
Sky Horse was developed by the National Chung-Shan Institute of Science and Technology (CSIST), and was associated with the country's then-secret nuclear weapons program. With a range of 600-950 kilometres, it would have been capable of striking pre-emptively at ports, airfields or missile bases on the Mainland in an arc from Shanghai to Zhanjiang. The Sky Horse was to be the primary delivery vehicle for the Taiwanese nuclear weapons. The secondary delivery vehicle was planned to be the then in development AIDC F-CK-1 Ching-kuo.

== Project cancellation ==
The Sky Horse project was cancelled partly due to pressure from the US, and partly so that the CSIST could concentrate on the Sky Bow missile. There were calls to revive the program in response to China's missile threats during 1995 and 1996. A senior Taiwanese official admitted that Taiwan was 'taken aback by China's moves', and there were fears that these could lead to an arms race.

== General characteristics ==
- Length: > 20 metres
- Propellant: Solid fuel
- Range: Estimated 600 – 950 km
- Guidance: Inertial
- Launch platform: Land-based
- Payload: ~ 350 kg
