= National Atomic Research Institute =

Research center in Longtan, Taoyuan City, Taiwan

Coordinates: 24°51′27.7″N 121°15′06.5″E

- 國家原子能科技研究院

Agency overview
- Formed: 27 September 2023
- Jurisdiction: Taiwan
- Headquarters: Longtan, Taoyuan
- Agency executives: Shin CHANG, Chair of the Board; Tsu-Mu KAO, President; Chin-Cheng Huang, Secretary-General
- Parent agency: Nuclear Safety Commission Supervising
- Website: https://www.nari.org.tw/

The National Atomic Research Institute (NARI; Chinese: 國家原子能科技研究院; Tongyong Pinyin: Guójiā Yuánzǐnéng Kējì Yánjiòuyuàn; Tâi-lô: Kok-ka Guân-tsí-lîng Kho-kí Gián-kiù-înn) is an administrative corporation reorganized from the Institute of Nuclear Energy Research (INER) and supervised by the Nuclear Safety Commission (NSC) of Taiwan. INER, the predecessor of NARI, was one of the agencies included in the government reform in 2023. It has been transformed from a government agency into an administrative corporation since September 27. It is dedicated to the research and development of technologies on nuclear safety, radiation application, and new energy. Targeting nuclear safety, nuclear back-end, nuclear medicine and other radiation applications for people's livelihood, new energy and cross-field system integration as the main development axes of its mission, NARI endeavors to help realizing a low-carbon society so as to improve people's livelihood and well-being.

== History ==
Before NARI, INER (Institute of Nuclear Energy Research) was a governmental research institute established on May 9, 1968. It was the sole national research institute to promote peaceful applications of nuclear science in Taiwan. The Taiwan Research Reactor(TRR) was constructed and reached full power operation on 7 March 1973. After 15 years’ operation, TRR decommission project was approved by Atomic Nuclear Council (the nuclear authority of Taiwan) in 2004.

In January 1988, the deputy director of INER Colonel Chang Sen-i defected to the United States.

The TRR decommission project should be completed in 25 years. In addition, a 30 MeV cyclotron was built on May 26, 1993 for R&Ds of nuclear medicine and radiation applications.

Research activities were expanded to new and renewable energies from 2002 in line with non-nuclear policy in Taiwan. Throughout the years, the nuclear back-end R&D technologies were carried out in INER.

INER was reorganized as "National Atomic Research Institute (NARI)" on September 27, 2023. To become the most trustworthy atomic energy R&D institution in Taiwan as its vision, those core fields of technologies development are nuclear safety, nuclear back-end, nuclear medicine and other radiation applications for people's livelihood, and green energy technologies.

== Organization ==
NARI is organized with two advisory committees, one center, ten R&D departments and five administrative departments. The operation of NARI, supervised by the Board of Directors, is led by the President and three Vice Presidents. The budget resource is around 70 million USD in 2023. Currently there are 892 personnel in NARI based in September 2023. Among which two thirds are research staffs with Master's or PhD degrees.

== Management Team ==
The Board of Directors consists of a chair and 10 directors. Also, there are three supervisors. The operation of NARI, supervised by the Board of Directors, is leaded by the President and three Vice-Presidents. The Chair is dispatched from its supervising organization, Nuclear Safety Commission (NSC). For effective management, NARI is organized with two advisory committees, one center, ten R&D departments and five administrative departments.

Preparatory period (from 2023/09 - 2023/11) National Atomic Research Institute
Chair
Term	Name	Start date	End date
1	Shin CHANG	2023/09	-
Presidents
Term	Name	Start date	End date
1	Hei-Kuang LEE (Acting)	2023/09	2023/11
National Atomic Research Institute
Chair
Term	Name	Start date	End date
1	Shin CHANG	-	Present
Presidents
Term	Name	Start date	End date
1	Tsu-Mu KAO	2023/11	Present

== Previous Director-Generals ==
Preparatory office for the establishment of INER (Institute of Nuclear Energy Research) was established on 25 January 1966. Accordingly, INER was established on 9 May 1968. During this period, from January 1966 to September 2023, in succession there are 14 Director-Generals as listed below.

Institute of Nuclear Energy Research
Director-General (from 1966-2023)
Term	Name	Start date	End date
1	Ji-Peng CHIEN	1966/08	1984/04
2	Kuang-Chi LIU	1984/04	1987/08
3	Jen-Chang CHOU	1987/08	1992/02
4	Der-Yu HSIA	1992/02	2000/05
5	Ging-Shung YU	2000/05	2001/03
6	Shieh-Jun WANG	2001/03	2002/02
7	Gann TIN (Acting)	2002/02	2002/05
8	Chao-Yie YANG	2002/05	2004/06
9	Li-Fu LIN	2004/06	2007/12
10	Tao-Nan YEH	2007/12	2010/01
11	Yin-Pang MA	2010/01	2018/07
12	Kin-Fu LIN	2018/07	2019/07
13	Chien-Liang SHIH (Acting)	2019/07	2019/11
14	Charn-Ying CHEN	2019/11	2023/09
