= RAM-2X =

Ukrainian unmanned aerial vehicle

- Type: Loitering munition
- Place of origin: Ukraine

The RAM-2X is an unmanned aerial vehicle (UAV) and loitering munition developed by Ukraine and first revealed in April 2024. It uses an X-wing configuration for manoeuvrability. It is an upgraded version of the RAM-II drone, a design based on the DeViRo Leleka-100.

While exact specifications have not been disclosed, it is rumoured of being able to carry a warhead weighing up to 3 kg, reach speeds of 160 km per hour, hit targets at distances of more than 150 km, and operating under electronic warfare conditions.

In December 2024, the system was presented as being used in conjunction with Ukrspecsystems' Shark drone in the spotter role.

== Operational history ==
The RAM-2X is being used by Ukrainian forces during the Russian invasion of Ukraine. Video evidence and intelligence reports indicate hits on stationary targets, such as air defense installations, and moving military vehicles. It has been seen in the Donetsk, Kursk, and Luhansk regions.

== Operators ==
- Ukraine

== See also ==
- UJ-25 Skyline – Ukrainian unmanned aerial vehicle
- UJ-26 Bober (drone) – Ukrainian long-range UAV
- AN-196 Liutyi – Ukrainian long-range UAV
- ZALA Lancet – Russian loitering munition
- AeroVironment Switchblade – American loitering missile
- Aevex Phoenix Ghost – American loitering munition
- UVision Hero
- FP-1 (unmanned aerial vehicle) – Ukrainian long-range one-way attack drone
