= Nagastra-1 =

Unmanned aerial vehicle and loitering munition

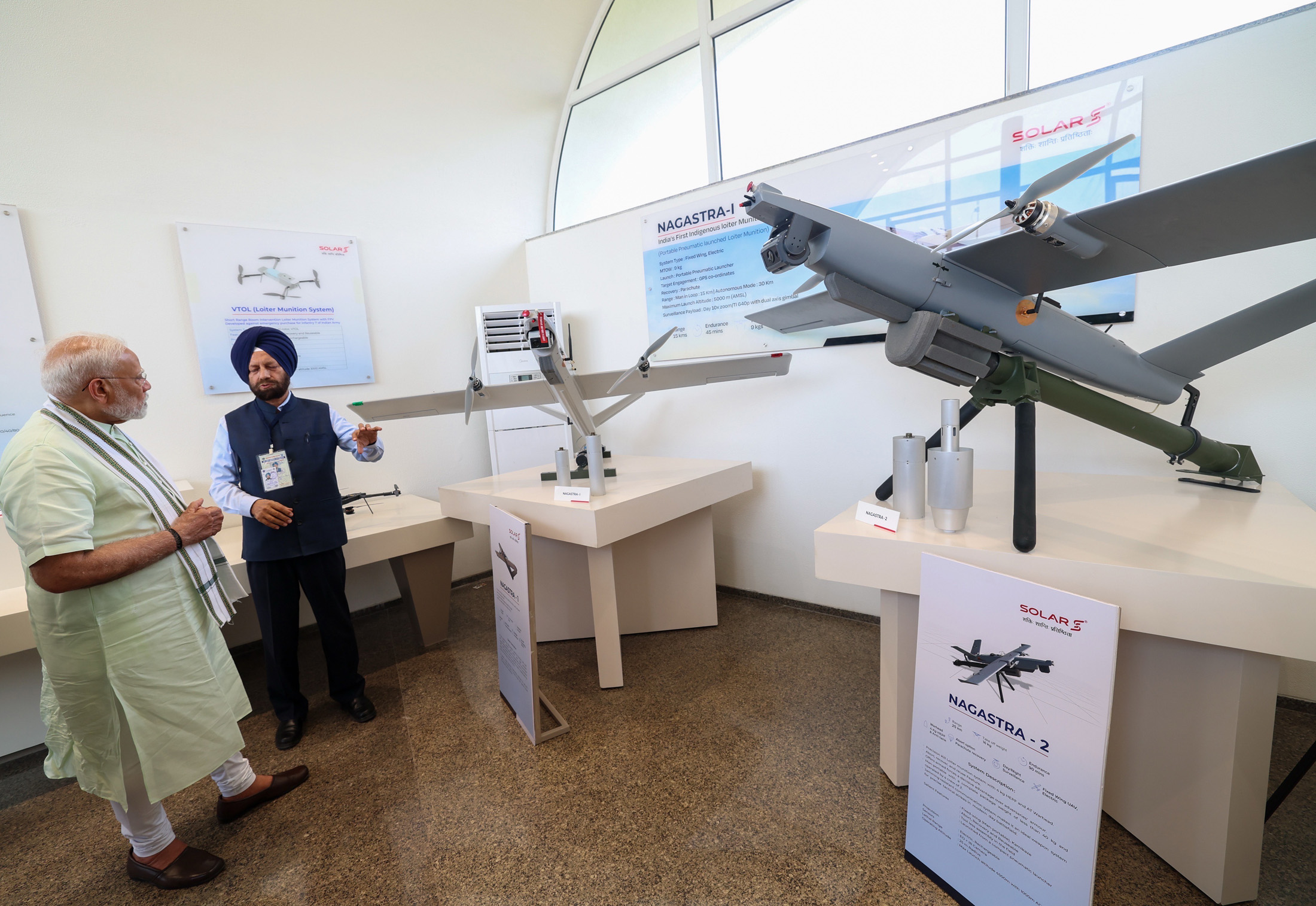
- Type: Unmanned aerial vehicle Loitering munition
- Place of origin: India

Service history
- Used by: Indian Army
- Wars: 2025 India–Pakistan conflict

Production history
- Designer: Z-Motion Autonomous Systems; Economic Explosives Limited
- Manufacturer: Economic Explosives Limited
- Produced: 2024–current

Specifications
- Mass: 8–9 kg (18–20 lb)
- Warhead: High-explosive fragmentation
- Warhead weight: 1–1.5 kg (2.2–3.3 lb)
- Engine: Electric motor
- Operational range: 30–40 km (19–25 mi)
- Flight ceiling: >4,500 m (4.5 km) AMSL
- Flight altitude: >200 m (660 ft) AGL
- Accuracy: 2 m (6 ft 7 in) CEP

The Nagastra-1 is an indigenously designed, portable unmanned aerial vehicle and loitering munition, developed by the Nagpur based private company Economic Explosives Limited in collaboration with Bengaluru based startup Z-Motion Autonomous Systems. It is intended to give the Indian Army a modern, lightweight, and adaptable system for asymmetric warfare, such as reconnaissance and precision strikes.

Nagastra-1 can precisely locate, track, and destroy the target. It is used for concentrated attacks against single, authorized target while reducing collateral damage. With AI capabilities, Nagastra-1 can keep circling the skies until it locates its target. By delivering precise hits on enemy training camps, launch pads, and infiltration units, the Nagastra-1 lowers the risk for soldiers. As per the company, Nagastra-1 is made of over 75% indigenous content.

== History and development ==
The use of loitering munitions during the Nagorno-Karabakh conflict, the Red Sea crisis, the Russian invasion of Ukraine, and the Chinese acquisitions of suicide drones as well as the increase in drone-related incidents in India's border areas, particularly with Pakistan, prompted Economics Explosives Limited, a subsidiary of Solar Industries, to work with Indian startup Z-Motion Autonomous Systems to develop Nagastra-1 for the Indian Army. Nagastra-1 is man-portable, electric powered fixed wing unmanned aerial vehicle/loitering munition. With a total weight of 30 kg divided between two backpack, the Nagastra-1 weapon system includes a payload, communication control, portable ground control station, and a pneumatic launcher. Nagastra-1 is based on Z Motion Autonomous Systems' Trinetra loitering munition. The UAV weighs 8–9 kg and has a 30-minute flight endurance time with two electric motors. With man-in-loop control, its range is 15 km, while in autonomous mode, it can reach 30–40 km. The 30-minute flight endurance time has now been extended to 60 minutes.

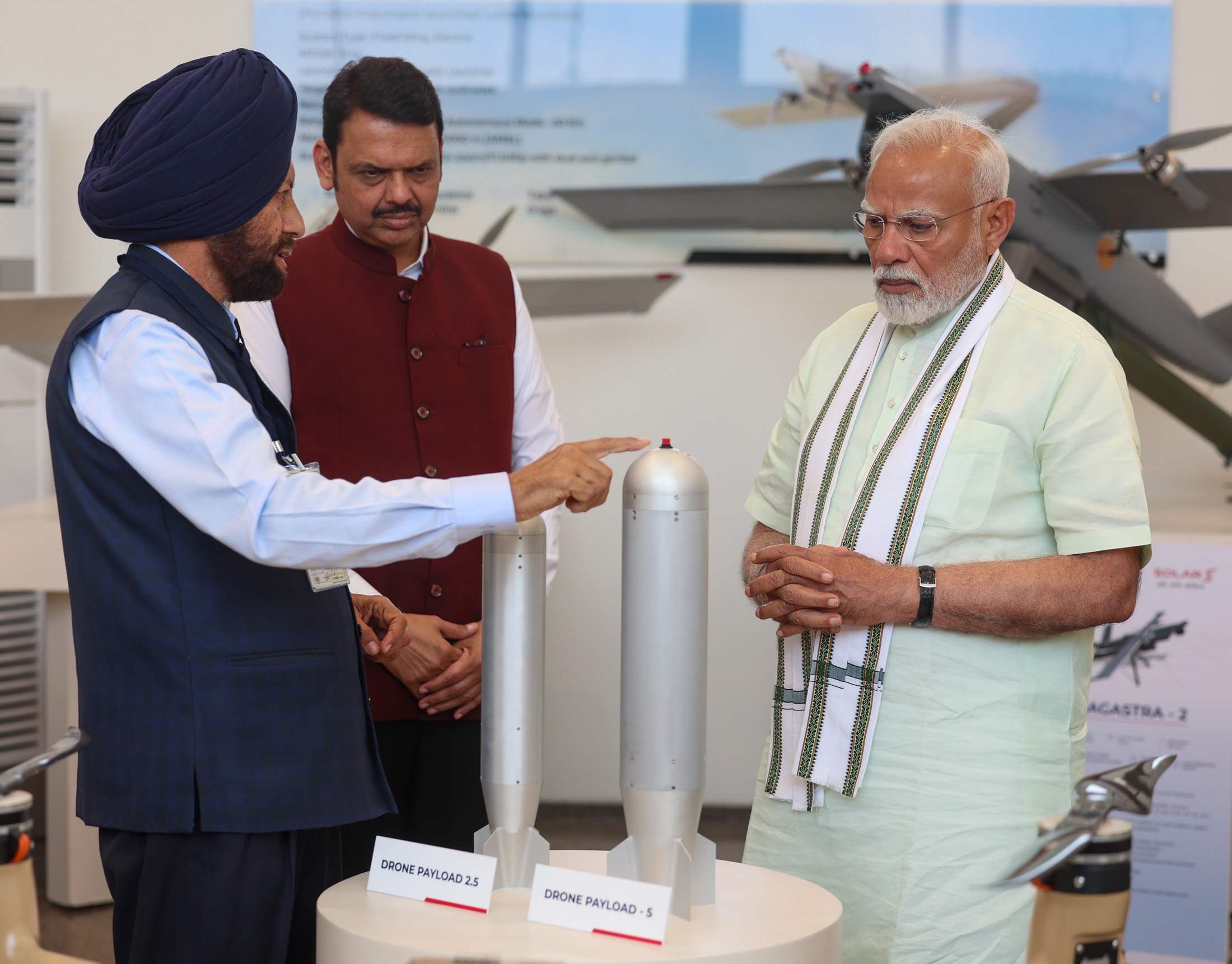
Nagastra warhead on display

Nagastra-1 carries 1-1.5 kg of high-explosive fragmentation warhead with surveillance cameras for day and night operation. After taking off, Nagastra-1 can fly over a designated region and look for a suitable target. When the target is located, it dives at it and eliminates it. Nagastra-1 allows for quicker reaction times for moving targets. Due to the ability to modify or cancel attacks in mid-flight, more selective targeting is possible by faster response time against hidden targets. Because it uses an electric propulsion system, the UAV has a low acoustic signature, making it almost undetectable at heights above 200 meters. In kamikaze mode, Nagastra-1 can use GPS/NavIC satellite guidance to eliminate hostile threats with an accuracy of up to 2 meters CEP. Nagastra-1 has the ability to terminate its mission in midair and be recovered using a parachute recovery mechanism for use in future missions.

=== Nagastra-1R ===
A 360-degree gimbal camera is part of the system, and for night missions, a thermal camera can be added. It also has a high-precision targeting system with a circular error probable (CEP) of 2 meters, as well as proprietary encryption for safe video and telemetry transmissions. More than 80% of the system's parts are indigenous. Successful field tests have been conducted at Babina, and Ladakh.

== Features ==
- Lightweight, portable and easy to carry the entire weapon system in two backpacks.
- Precision strike capability in kamikaze mode.
- Operation at high altitudes above 4,500 meters.
- Cameras for day and night surveillance and a warhead for soft-skin targets.
- Recall and reuse. A parachute-based mid-flight recovery system and a mission abort function for unidentified targets.

== Future development ==
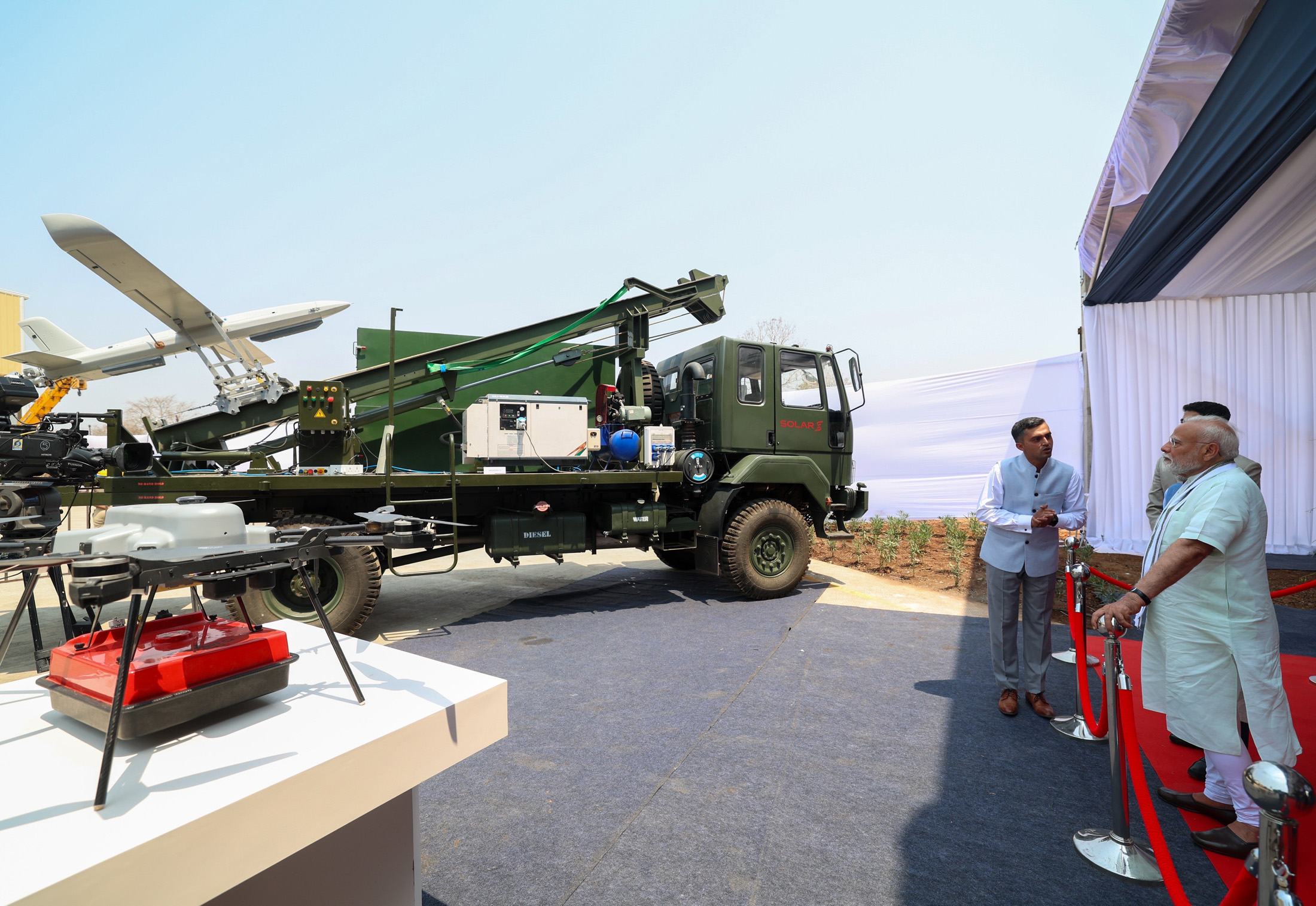
Nagastra-3 on display

While the subsidiary company Economic Explosives Limited, began developmental works for the Nagastra-2 and Nagastra-3, more advanced variants of the platform with improved warhead carrying capacity and flying endurance. The design and development of a medium altitude long endurance class of drones has also been proposed by Solar Industries. For man-in-loop control, the 12 kg Nagastra-2 carrying 2.2–4 kg anti-tank/anti-personnel warhead will have a range of more than 25 km and can hover over a target for 90 minutes. It is to be used against armoured warfare targets. Nagastra-2 will be armed with a 4 kg tandem shaped-charge warhead which can penetrate up to 650 mm of rolled homogeneous armour (RHA) and will feature day-night capable high-resolution cameras and electronic counter-countermeasure (ECCM) technology.

The Nagastra-3 is a component of Medium Range Precision Kill System. The Ministry of Defense has placed it under Project Sanction Order in the Make-I category of the Defense Acquisition Procedure 2020. The operational range and endurance of Nagastra-3 will be up to 100 km and more than 5 hours, respectively.

== Order ==
On 24 April 2023, Solar Industries announced that Economic Explosives Limited had defeated contenders from Poland's WB Electronics Warmate and Israel's UVision Air to secure a ₹212 crore contract with the Ministry of Defense for the provision of supplying loitering munitions. Compared to similar airborne weaponry imported from Poland and Israel, Nagastra-1 is found 40% less expensive.

As part of its ongoing efforts to improve precision-strike capabilities and update its artillery and infantry support systems, the Indian Army ordered 450 Nagastra-1R loitering munitions on 23 June 2025. The deliveries were completed in a single batch on 13 October 2026. The contract was worth ₹158 crore (equivalent to ₹163 crore or US$17 million in 2026).

== Operational history ==
The Indian Army confirmed the system's readiness for deployment by completing a pre-delivery inspection for the first batch of Nagastra-1 which consists of 120 units at Army Ammunition Depot in Pulgaon between 20–25 May 2024.

In order to acquire and engage targets during Operation Sindoor, the Indian Army employed Nagastra-1.

== Operators ==
India

- Indian Army: The initial batch of 120 units were delivered in June 2024. Additional 480 units delivered in December 2024.

== See also ==
- WB Electronics Warmate
- UVision Air Hero
- AeroVironment Switchblade
- Raytheon Coyote
- ZALA Lancet
