= Rheinmetall FV-014 =

Loitering munition developed by Rheinmetall

- Type: Loitering munition
- Place of origin: Germany

Production history
- Designer: Rheinmetall

The Rheinmetall FV-014 is a fixed-wing loitering munition (often referred to as a "kamikaze drone") developed by the German defense manufacturer Rheinmetall.

== Design ==
Designed to operate in electronically contested environments, the system combines intelligence, surveillance, and reconnaissance (ISR) capabilities with precision strike functions. It is intended to target heavy armor, artillery positions, and command posts at ranges up to 100 kilometers.

The FV-014 is launched from a rectangular transport-and-launch container using a solid-fuel booster rocket. Once airborne, the munition deploys folding wings and transitions to aerodynamic flight, powered by a rear-mounted electric pusher propeller. This electric propulsion system is designed to minimize acoustic and thermal signatures during the terminal approach phase.

The airframe features faceted geometric structures intended to reduce the drone's radar cross-section (RCS). The munition has a total launch weight of approximately 20 kg (44 lb).

The system boasts a flight endurance of up to 70 minutes and a maximum operational range of 100 km, supported by a secure data link effective up to 60 km. The FV-014 carries a 5 kg (11 lb) high-explosive dual-purpose (HEDP) shaped-charge fragmentation warhead, which Rheinmetall claims is capable of penetrating more than 600 millimeters of rolled homogeneous armour (RHA).

The drone utilizes a "human-in-the-loop" control architecture via a portable ground station, allowing an operator to validate targets, abort strikes, or coordinate swarm attacks. It is specifically engineered to operate in environments where Global Navigation Satellite Systems (GNSS) are jammed or denied.

== Operational history ==
=== Testing and demonstrations ===
On February 18, 2026, Rheinmetall conducted a live-fire demonstration of the FV-014 for an undisclosed prospective NATO customer. The tests took place at the National Test Centre for Unmanned Aerial Systems, operated by the German Aerospace Centre (DLR) in Cochstedt, Saxony-Anhalt. During the demonstration, the munition successfully executed various attack profiles, including striking a simulated armored vehicle target.

=== Alleged combat deployment ===
Defense analysts and media outlets, including Defense Express, have noted that Rheinmetall previously claimed the FV-014 system had acquired "combat experience" prior to its official public testing. Observers have speculated that early prototypes of the munition were secretly field-tested by Ukrainian forces during the Russo-Ukrainian War, as it remains the primary modern battlefield for testing unmanned systems in highly contested electronic warfare environments. Rheinmetall has not officially confirmed specific deployments in Ukraine.

== See also ==
- AeroVironment Switchblade
- ZALA Lancet
