= Loitering munition =

Type of guided unmanned aerial vehicle

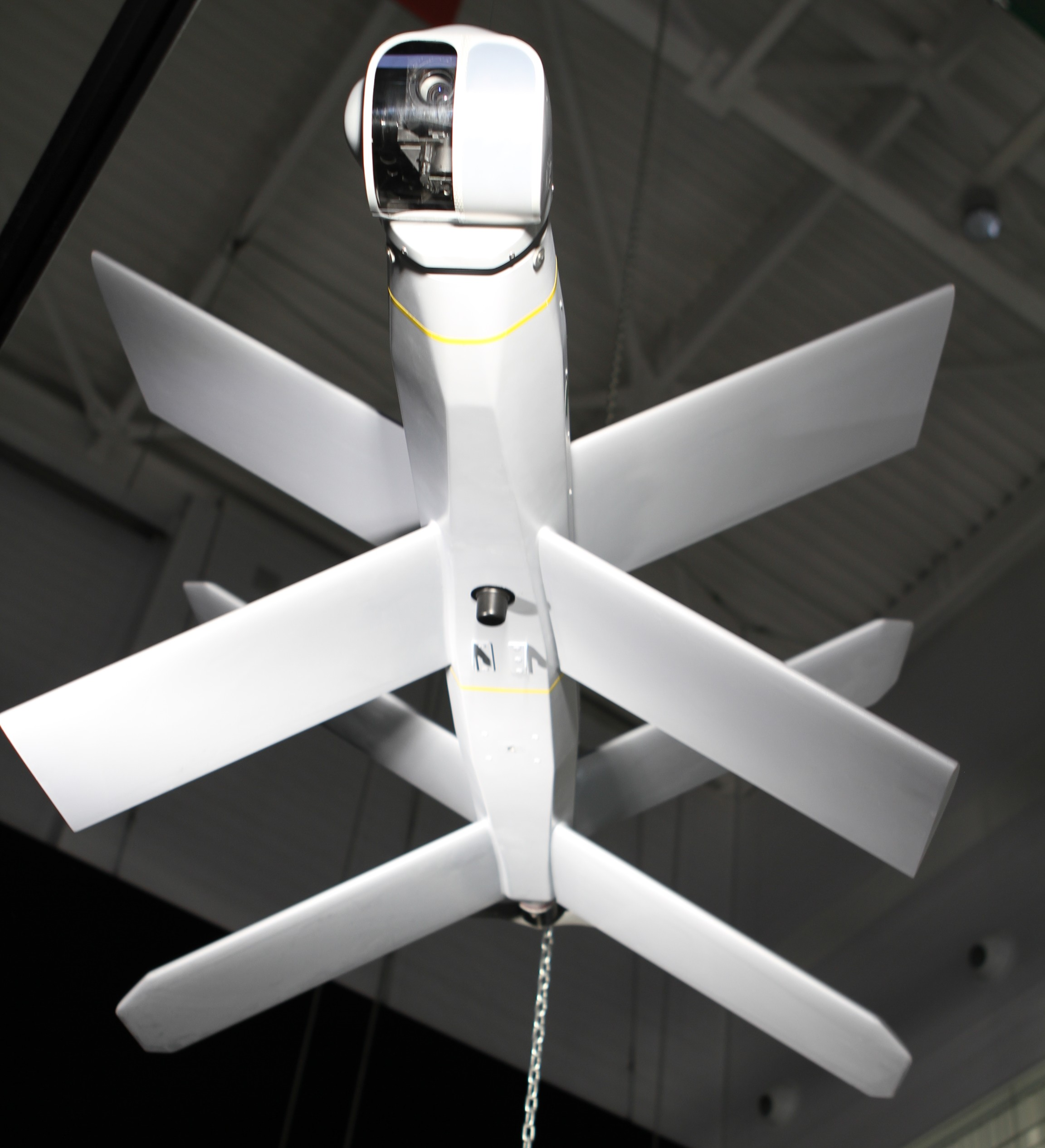
Russian ZALA Lancet loitering munition, with electro-optical targeting system at the front

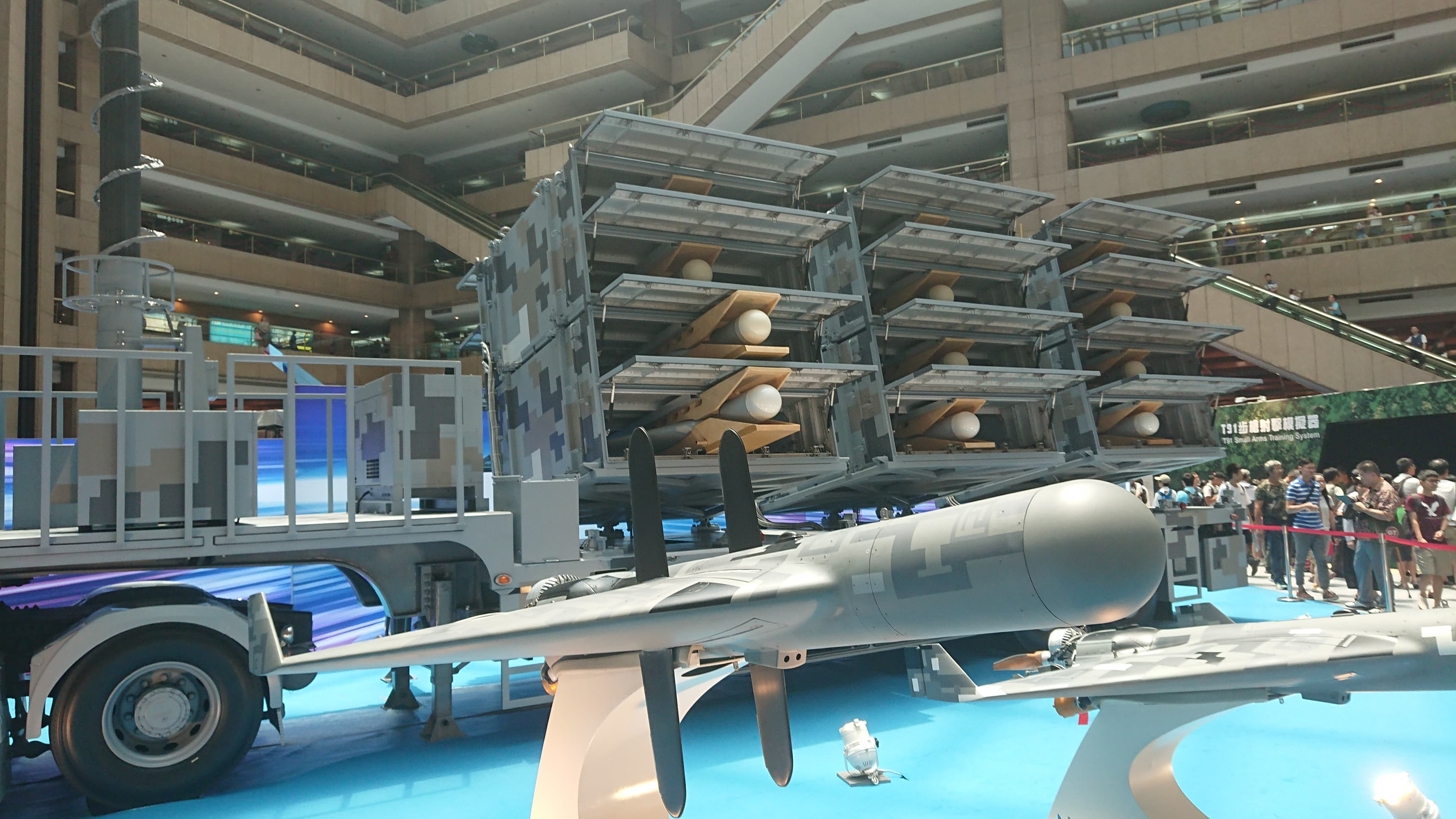
NCSIST Chien Hsiang, along with its launching system behind, is an anti-radiation (anti-radar) loitering munition designed to search for and destroy radar systems using only an anti-radiation seeker

A loitering munition (LM) is a type of self-destructive unmanned vehicle (aerial (UAV), surface (USV), or underwater (UUV)) equipped with a warhead that is typically designed to remotely loiter by a human operator using electro-optical targeting sensors or camera suite and data-link until a target is designated, then crash into it and detonate. Anti-radiation (anti-radar) loitering munitions are a type of loitering munition that employ either an anti-radiation seeker by itself or in tandem with an electro-optical targeting system to locate enemy radar by loitering and destroy it after detection. Common terms like suicide drone, kamikaze drone, or exploding drone are used for both loitering munition and one-way attack drones. They enable attacks against hidden targets that emerge for short periods without placing high-value platforms near the target area. Unlike many other types of munitions, their attacks can be changed mid-mission or aborted. Loitering munitions are typically aerial platforms, but include some autonomous undersea vehicles with similar characteristics.

Loitering weapons emerged in the 1980s for the suppression of enemy air defenses (SEAD) role, and were deployed for SEAD by some military forces in the 1990s. In the 2000s, they were developed for additional roles, from long-range strikes and fire support to short-range tactical systems that fit in a backpack.

== History ==
=== First development and terminology ===
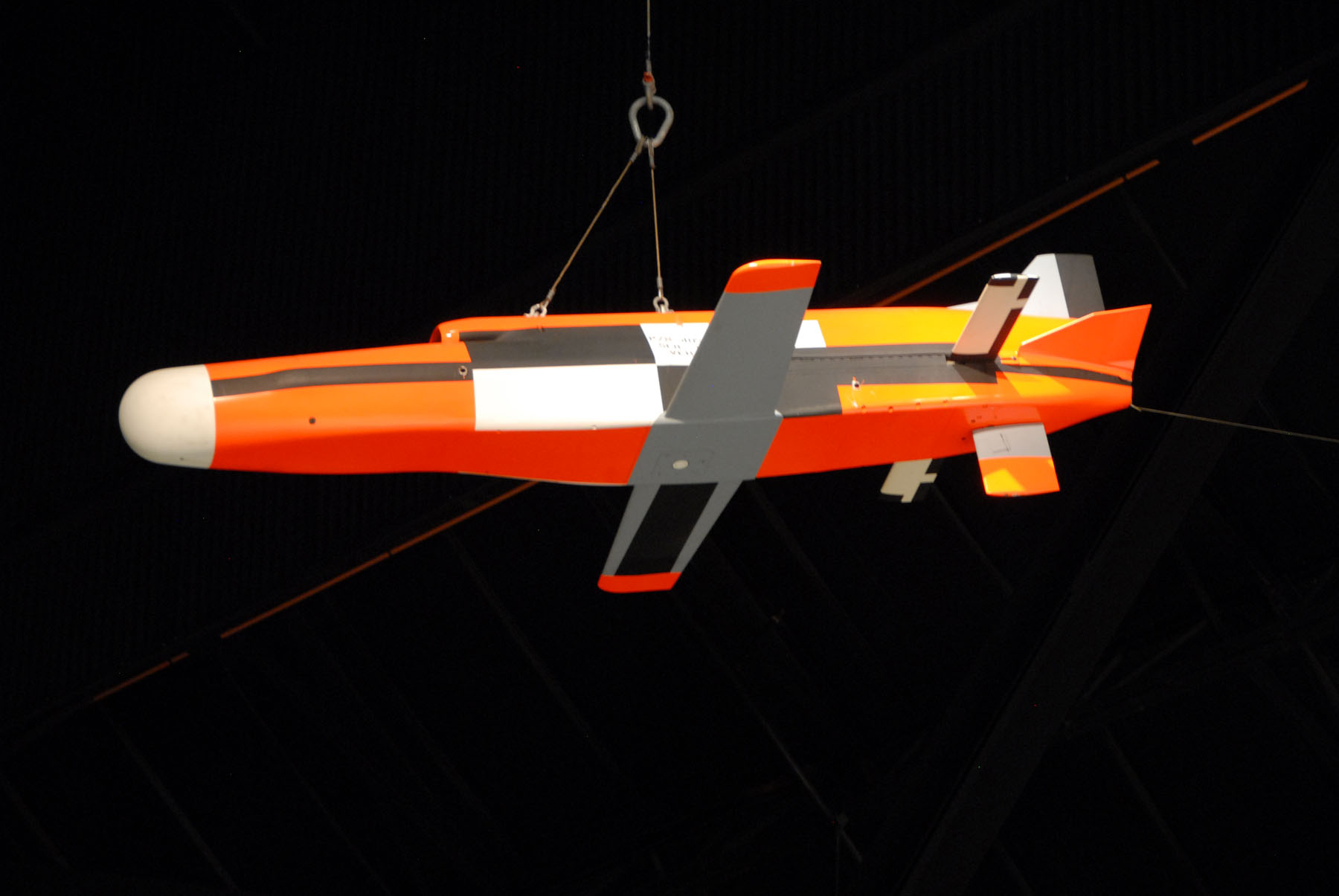
Northrop AGM-136 Tacit Rainbow on display at the National Museum of the U.S. Air Force in Dayton, Ohio

Initially, loitering munitions were not referred to as such but rather as "suicide UAVs" or "loitering missiles". Different sources point at different projects as originating the weapon category. The failed US AGM-136 Tacit Rainbow program (Note: Loitering munitions fit in the niche between cruise missiles and unmanned combat aerial vehicles (UCAVs or combat drones), sharing characteristics with both. They differ from cruise missiles in that they are designed to loiter for a relatively long time around the target area, and from UCAVs in that a loitering munition is intended to be expended in an attack and has a built-in warhead. As such, they can also be considered a nontraditional ranged weapon.) or the 1980s initial Israeli Delilah variants are mentioned by some sources. The Iranian Ababil-1 was produced in the 1980s but its exact production date is unknown. The Israeli IAI Harpy was produced in the late 1980s. Early projects did not use the "loitering munition" nomenclature, which emerged much later; they used terminology existing at the time. For instance the AGM-136 Tacit Rainbow was described in a 1988 article:

the Tacit Rainbow unmanned jet aircraft being developed by Northrop to loiter on high and then swoop down on enemy radars could be called a UAV, a cruise missile, or even a standoff weapon. But it is most definitely not an RPV.

— Canan, James W. "Unmanned Aerial Vehicles." Air Force Magazine (1988), page 87

=== Initial role in suppression of enemy air defense ===
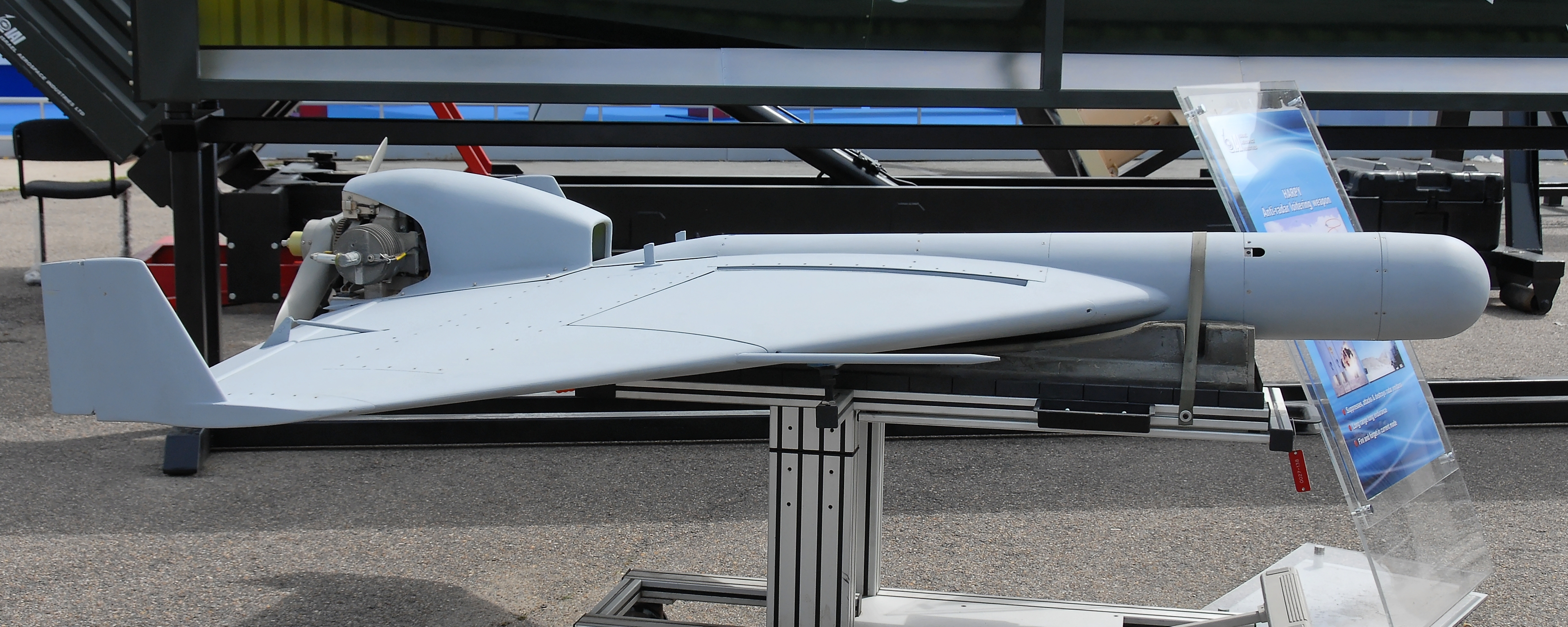
IAI Harpy is an anti-radar loitering munition

In response to the first generation of fixed-installation surface-to-air missiles (SAMs) such as S-75 and S-125, the U.S. military developed SEAD doctrine and Wild Weasel weapons, including anti-radiation missiles (ARMs) such as AGM-45 Shrike. The Soviet Union countered with mobile SAMs such as 2K12 Kub and intermittent use of radar. In Israel's 1982 Operation Mole Cricket 19, UAVs and air-launched Samson decoys were used over suspected SAM areas to saturate enemy SAMs and to bait them to activate their radar systems, which were then attacked by ARMs.

In the 1980s, programs such as the IAI Harpy and AGM-136 Tacit Rainbow integrated anti-radiation sensors into a drone or missile coupled with command and control and loitering capabilities. This allowed the attacking force to put relatively cheap munitions over suspected SAM sites, then attack when the SAM battery was spotted.

=== Evolution into other roles ===
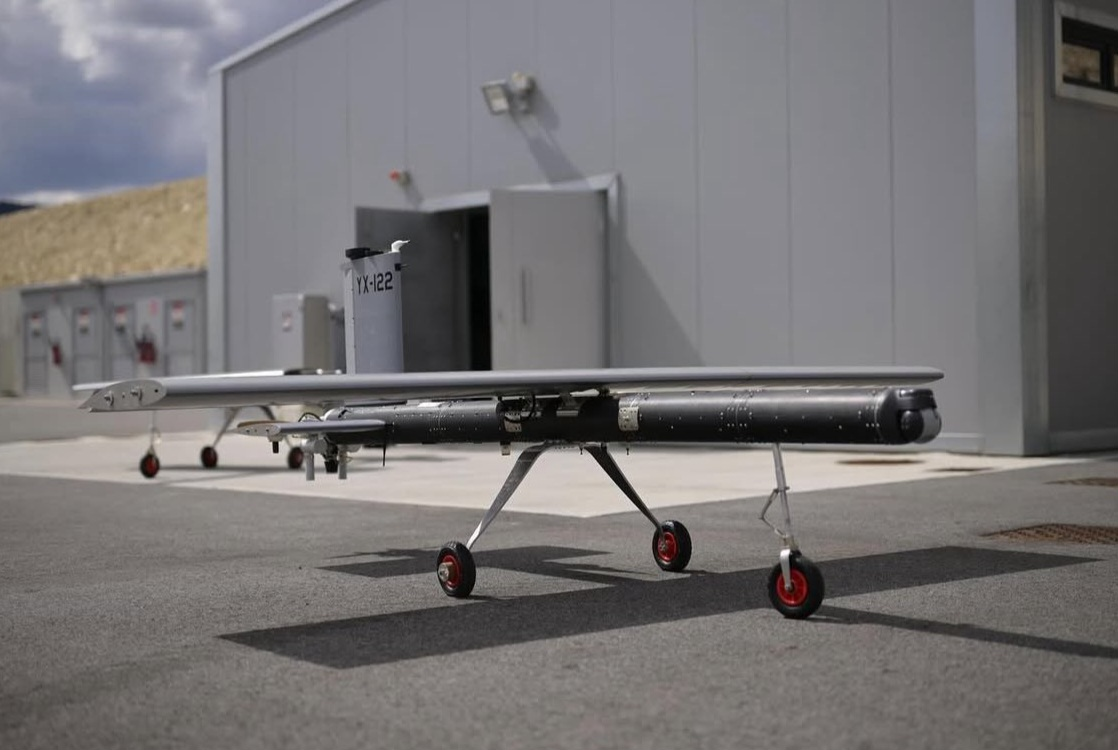
YIHA-III is a loitering munition jointly developed by Turkey and Pakistan designed to destroy enemy armored vehicles

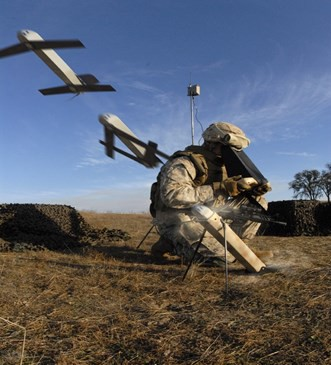
Time lapse of a man-portable Switchblade 300 loitering munition launched by a US Marine

D1L-Duck drone

Starting in the 2000s, loitering weapons have been developed for additional roles from relatively long-range strikes and fire support to very-short-range tactical use. In the 2016 Nagorno-Karabakh conflict, an IAI Harop was used against a bus used as a troop transport for Armenian soldiers. The ZALA Lancet loitering munitions and several one-way attack drones including the HESA Shahed 136, have been used by Russia in the Russo-Ukrainian war, while Ukraine has fielded loitering munitions such as the UJ-25 Skyline and the American-made AeroVironment Switchblade, which is deployed to platoons and fits in a backpack.

During conflicts in the 2010s and 2020s, conventional armies and non-state militants began modifying common commercial racing drones into "FPV loitering munitions" by the attachment of a small explosive, so-named because of the first-person view (FPV) they provide the operator. Explosive ordnance such as an IED, grenade, mortar round or an RPG warhead are fitted to an FPV drone then deployed to aerial bomb tactical targets. FPV drones also allow direct reconnaissance during the drone's strike mission.

Since the escalation of the Russo-Ukrainian war in 2022, both Russian and Ukrainian forces were producing thousands of FPV drones every month by October 2023, many of which were donated by volunteer groups. Escadrone Pegasus and the Vyriy Drone Molfar are two examples of the low-cost drones that rapidly evolved in 2022–23 during the war. In 2022, the UK Government announced it was providing "hundreds of loitering munitions" to Ukraine. On 9 November 2023, Ukrainian soldiers claimed to have used a civilian-donated FPV drone to destroy a Russian Tor missile system on the Kupiansk front, showcasing the potential cost-effectiveness of fielding such munitions. A Tor missile system costs some $24 million to build, which could buy 14,000 FPV drones.

Some multirole loitering munitions, such as the Eren, made by the Turkish company Roketsan, can play the role of an interceptor drone by destroying enemy aerial platforms including UAVs while retaining their ground attack capabilities. On 23 February 2026, a Baykar Bayraktar Akinci UCAV successfully destroyed a target drone with the Eren loitering munition.

The Israeli Spike Firefly, developed by Rafael Advanced Defense Systems, has been used in the Gaza Strip for its precision and ability to strike targets behind cover. Usage was confirmed by the manufacturer in 2024.

== Characteristics ==
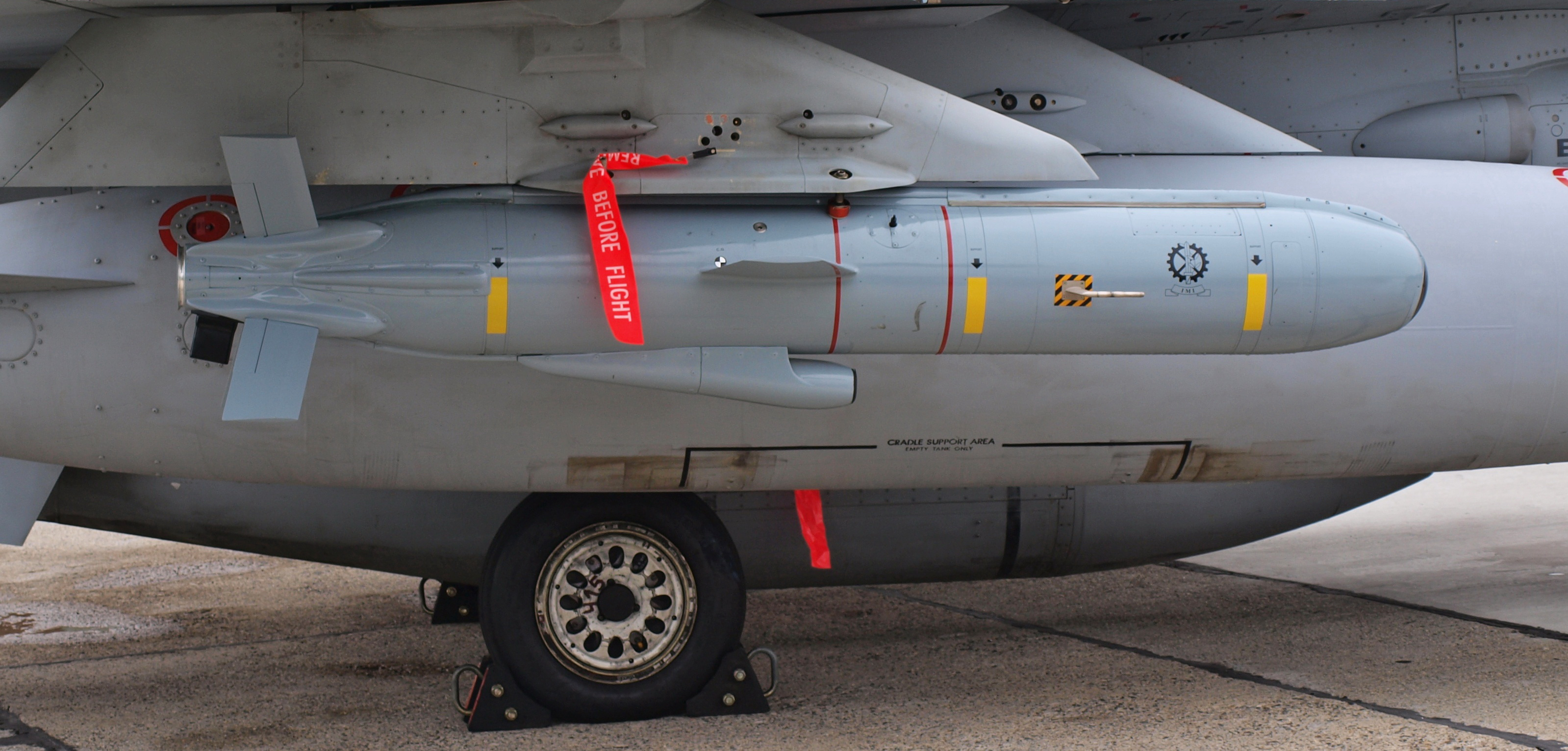
Missile shaped air-launched Delilah loitering munition, controlled by backseat WSO

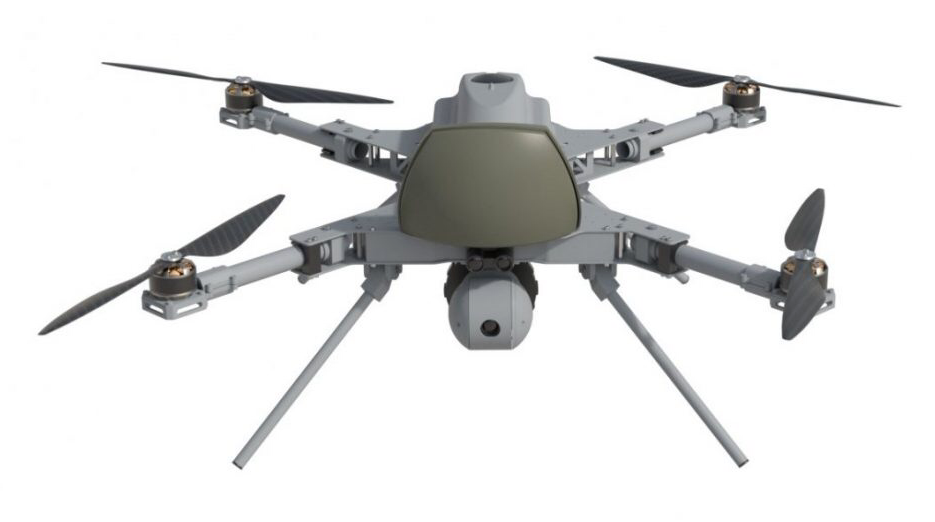
Turkish purpose-built quadrotor loitering munition STM Kargu was the first lethal autonomous weapon to attack enemy combatants in warfare

Loitering munitions may be as simple as an unmanned aerial vehicle (UAV) with attached explosives that is sent on a potential kamikaze mission, and may even be constructed with commercially available quadcopters with strapped-on explosives. Purpose-built quadcopter loitering munitions were also made such as the STM Kargu.

Purpose-built munitions are more elaborate in flight and control capabilities, warhead size and design, and onboard sensors for locating targets. Most of the loitering munitions use a human operator to remotely locate targets such as IAI Harop. On the other hand, anti-radar loitering munitions such as IAI Harpy can function autonomously searching and launching attacks against radar without human intervention using an anti-radiation seeker. Its latest compact variant Mini Harpy is equipped with both the electro-optical targeting system and anti-radiation seeker.

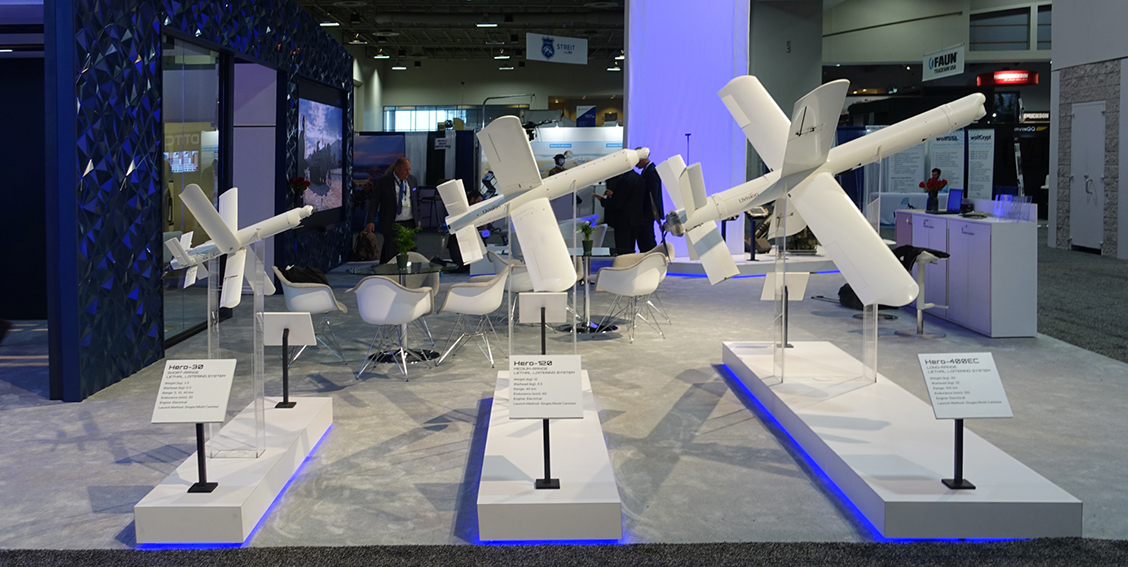
Double X-shaped wing loitering munition models HERO 30, HERO 120 & HERO 400EC built by UVision

Some loitering munitions have double X-shaped wing configuration such as ZALA Lancet and UVision HERO series. Loitering systems are operated remotely, controlled in real time by a communications system and equipped with an electro-optical camera whose images are received by the command and control station.

Some loitering munitions may return and be recovered by the operator if they are unused in an attack and have enough fuel; in particular this is characteristic of UAVs with a secondary explosive capability. Other systems do not have a recovery option and are self-destructed in mission aborts. Some jet-powered loitering munitions such as Roketsan's Eren and Delilah structures are more similar to missiles than unmanned aerial vehicles.

== Countermeasures ==
Russia has continually utilized ZALA Lancet drones in Ukraine. Since spring 2022 Ukrainian forces have been building cages around their artillery pieces using chain link fencing, wire mesh and even wooden logs as part of the construction. One analyst told Radio Liberty that such cages were "mainly intended to disrupt Russian Lancet munitions". A picture supposedly taken from January 2023 shows the rear half of a Lancet drone that failed to detonate due to such cages. Likewise Ukrainian forces have used inflatable decoys and wooden vehicles, such as HIMARS, to confuse and deceive Lancet drones.

Ukrainian soldiers report shooting down Russian drones with sniper rifles. Russian soldiers use electronic warfare to disable or misdirect Ukrainian drones and have reportedly used the Stupor anti-drone rifle, which uses an electromagnetic pulse that disrupts a drone's GPS navigation. A Royal United Services Institute study in 2022 found that Russian Electronic Warfare units, in March and April 2022, knocked out or shot down 90% of Ukrainian drones that they had at the start of the war in February 2022. The main success was in jamming GPS and radio links to the drones.

Both Ukraine and Russia rely on electronic warfare to defeat FPV drones. Such jammers are now used on Ukrainian trenches and vehicles. Russian forces have built jammers that can fit into a backpack. Pocket-size jammers for soldiers were also developed. As of June 2023 Ukraine was losing 5–10,000 drones a month, or 160 per day, according to Ukrainian soldiers.

This has led to Russia creating wire guided FPV drones, similar to a wire-guided missile or even wire-guided torpedoes. Those drones typically have fibre optic cables 5–20 km in length. Such guidance makes the link between operators and FPV drone immune to jamming. It also allows for much faster and better quality updates from the drone, even from locations where radio contact would be poor, and doesn't reveal operator's or drone's location by radio signals. They also need less power to communicate, and so can be used to idle on the ground for ambushes. They have reduced range, payload and manoeuvrability compared to wireless drones, although in practice, range and agility of the wired drones can be even higher than those of the radio-controlled ones, given their reduced control latency and increased survivability. Ukraine has also responded by using autonomous drones tasking to ensure that a jammed drone can hit a target. In March 2024 footage put on social media showed a Ukrainian FPV drone being jammed just before it struck a target. Despite the loss of operator control it still managed to strike the target.

Russian tanks have been fitted with rooftop slat armor at the beginning of the Russian invasion of Ukraine which could provide protection against loitering munitions in some circumstances. Some Ukrainian tanks taking part in the 2023 Ukrainian counteroffensive were also spotted using roof screens.

On 21 March 2024, recent footage of the submarine Tula showed that it has been fitted with a slat armor to prevent drone strikes, the first ocean-going asset to carry such a modification.

== Comparison to similar weapons ==
Loitering munitions fit in the niche between cruise missiles and unmanned combat aerial vehicles (UCAVs).

The following table compares similar size-class cruise missiles, loitering munitions, and UCAVS:

Characteristic	Cruise missile	Loitering munition	UCAV
Cost appropriate for expendable one-time use	Yes	Yes	No, but high cost allows for higher-quality platform
Recovery possible after launch	No	Sometimes	Yes, typical mission profile is round-trip
Built-in warhead	Yes	Yes	No
Stealthy final dive to target	Usually yes	Usually yes	Usually no
Loitering	No or limited	Yes	Usually yes
Sensors for target acquisition	Limited	Yes	Usually yes
Command and control during flight	Usually limited	Yes	Yes
Range	~1500 km	Varies, from 10–1000 km	~1000 km
Speed	Typically higher	Typically lower	Depends on role
Examples
Example type	Block IV Tomahawk cruise missile. Its small wing area is optimized for high-speed cruise.	Static display of an IAI Harop loitering munition optimized for the Suppression of Enemy Air Defenses (SEAD) role	General Atomics MQ-1 Predator UCAV
Range	1,600 km	1,000 km	1,100 km
Max speed	high sub-sonic, 880 km/h	190 km/h	217 km/h
Flight endurance	c. 2 hours	6 hours	24 hours
Engine	3.1 kilonewtons (700 lbf) F107-WR-402 turbofan engine	37 hp (28 kW) Wankel engine	115 hp (86 kW) Rotax 914F
Loaded system weight	1,588 kg	135 kg	1,020 kg
Payload	450 kg warhead	23 kg warhead	up to 204 kg (2 × AGM-114 Hellfire or 6 × AGM-176 Griffin air-to-surface missiles)
Length	6.25 m	2.5 m	8.22 m
Wingspan	2.67 m	3 m	16.8 m

Whereas some cruise missiles, such as the Block IV Tomahawk, have the ability to loiter and have some sensory and remote control features, their primary mission is typically strike and not target acquisition. Cruise missiles, as their name implies, are optimized for long-range flight at constant speed both in terms of propulsion systems and wings or lifting body design. They are often unable to loiter at slow fuel-efficient speeds which significantly reduces potential loiter time even when the missile has some loiter capabilities.

Conversely almost any UAV could be piloted to crash onto a target and most could be fitted with an improvised explosive warhead. However the primary use of a UAV or UCAV would be for recoverable flight operations carrying reconnaissance equipment and/or munitions. While many UAVs are explicitly designed with loitering in mind, they are not optimized for a diving attack, often lacking forward facing cameras, lacking in control response-speed which is unneeded in regular UAV flight, and are noisy when diving, potentially providing warning to the target. UAVs, being designed as multi-use platforms, often have a unit cost that is not appropriate for regular one-time expendable mission use. The primary mission of a loitering munition is reaching the suspected target area, target acquisition during a loitering phase, followed by a self-destructive strike, and the munition is optimized in this regard in terms of characteristics (e.g. very short engine lifetime, silence in strike phase, speed of strike dive, optimization toward loitering time instead of range/speed) and unit cost (appropriate for a one-off strike mission).

== Ethical and international humanitarian law concerns ==
Loitering munitions that can make autonomous attack decisions (man out of the loop) raise moral, ethical, and international humanitarian law concerns because a human being is not involved in the decision to attack and potentially kill humans. A distinction is often drawn with fire-and-forget missiles in common use since the 1960s, which may lock-on after launch or be sensor-fuzed, but whose flight time is typically limited and a human launches them at an area where enemy activity is strongly suspected. An autonomous loitering munition, on the other hand, may be launched at an area where enemy activity is only probable, and loiter searching autonomously for targets for hours after the initial launch decision, though it may be able to request final authorization for an attack from a human. The IAI Harpy and IAI Harop are frequently cited as aerial systems that set a precedent in this way—though some note that naval mines also loiter and may kill indiscriminately.

== Users and producers ==
As of 2026, loitering munitions are used by the armed forces of several countries, including:

- Albania – YIHA-III
- Argentina – HERO 30, HERO 120
- Armenia – HRESH, BEEB 1800, AW21
- Australia – Drone 40, Innovaero OWL
- Azerbaijan – IAI Harpy, IAI Harop, SkyStriker, STM Kargu, Qirği, Quzgün
- Belarus – UBAK-25 Chekan, Berkut-BM
- Brazil – Anshar
- Bulgaria – SAMJET
- China – IAI Harpy, CH-901, WS-43, CM-501X/XA, ASN-301, CH-817, ZT-25, ZT-180, FL-60A, Sunflower 200
- Egypt – Jabbar-150, Jabbar-200, Jabbar-250, Voltex-5, Voltex-10, Hamza-3, FL350
- France – Switchblade, Colibri, Larinae
- Georgia – Delta-WB Warmate
- Germany – Helsing HX-2, STARK Defence Virtus, Rheinmetall FV-014, Rheinmetall/UVision HERO Series
- Greece – Attalus, Aihmi AHM-1X IRIX
- Indonesia – Rajata, Minibe
- India – Nagastra-1, IAI Harpy, IAI Harop, SkyStriker, Warmate, Trinetra, ALS-50, Johnnette JM-1, Shaurya-1, Kadet, Loitering Aerial Munition, Overwatch PHOLOS, Zulu DRAP, Sureshastra Mk1, HERO 120, Berkut-BM, Sheshnaag-150, KAL (drone), FWD-LM01, Vayu Astra-1, Hoverbit Divyastra Mk-1, Hoverbit Divyastra Mk-2, Kawa UAV Divyastra Mk-3
- Iran – HESA Shahed 136, Shahed 131, HESA Ababil-2, Saqr 358, Meraj-521, Shahin-1, Zhubin, Rezvan, Raad-3 and possibly others
- Israel – UVision Air HERO series, IAI Harpy, IAI Harop, IAI Harpy NG, IAI Green Dragon, IAI Rotem L, Orbiter 1K, Delilah, SkyStriker, Spike Firefly, Viper, Lanius, Point Blank, SpyX, and upgraded variants
- Lithuania – Switchblade, Granta Hornet, Granta X, RSI Europe Špokas
- Morocco – IAI Harop, IAI Harpy, SpyX
- North Korea – In March 2025, North Korean state media stated that leader Kim Jong Un oversaw testing of AI-equipped reconnaissance and suicide drones produced by the country's Unmanned Aerial Technology Complex, inspected a new reconnaissance drone and an early warning and control (AEW) aircraft and pushed to expand the production of unmanned systems, citing their importance in modern warfare.
- Pakistan – GIDS Sarkash, E-RAD, Rover LM, Xpear MX-150, NASTP Dark Angel Series, YIHA-III, GIDS Blaze series, NASTP KaGeM V3, Mudamir-LR, Woot-Tech HiMark-25 TJ, HIT D248, HIT S369.
- Poland – WB Electronics Warmate
- Portugal – UAVision Elanus
- Russia – ZALA Kub-BLA ("Cube"), ZALA Lancet, Ushkuynik KVN, Gerbera, Molniya-1, Molniya-2, Molniya-13, Scalpel, V2U, ZALA Z-54 (BM-35), Garpia-A1E
- Saudi Arabia – Jaser, Sarem, X-1500, LTM-10
- Serbia – Gavran 145, Osica, Komarac, Vila 1
- Singapore – IAI Harop
- Slovakia – AX-2 Predator
- South Africa – Paramount N-Raven
- South Korea – Devil Killer, IAI Harpy
- Spain – Q-SLAM-40
- Sudan – Kamin-25, Safaroog
- Syria – Shaheen
- Taiwan – NCSIST Chien Hsiang, NCSIST Fire Cardinal
- Thailand – KB-5E
- Turkey – Robit UAV AZAB, IAI Harpy, STM Kargu, STM Alpagu, Transvaro-Havelsan Fedai, LENTATEK Kargı, Roketsan-STM Alpagut, YIHA-III, Baykar K2, Baykar Mizrak, Baykar Sivrisinek, Skydagger RTF 3.5" Mini Drone, Skydagger RTF 7" Drone, Skydagger RTF 7"X Drone, Skydagger RTF 10" Drone, Skydagger RTF 10”X Drone, Skydagger RTF 15" Drone, Skydagger RTF 15" Plus Drone, Skydagger Dart 81 Fixed Wing, Skydagger RTF Toyca 05 Fixed Wing, Skydagger RTF Toyca 10 Fixed Wing, Hunter Drone, Dasal Peregrine Family, Dasal Falcon Family, Beyondtech BAZNASTM Kuzgun, Titra Merküt
- Turkmenistan – SkyStriker
- UAE – QX-1, Hunter SP, Hunter 2-S, Hunter 5, Hunter 10, Shadow 25, Shadow 50, RW-24, N-Raven
- United Kingdom – Switchblade, Overwatch PHOLOS
- United States – ALTIUS-600M, AeroVironment Switchblade, Phoenix Ghost, Raytheon Coyote, HERO 120, Point Blank, Northrop Grumman Lumberjack, Artemis ALM-20 (alongside Ukraine)
- Ukraine – ALTIUS-600, AQ-400 Scythe, Bober, Liutyi, Overwatch PHOLOS, Phoenix Ghost, QinetiQ Banshee, RAM-2X, ST-35 Silent Thunder, Switchblade, UJ-25 Skyline, Warmate, FP-1, FP-2, Chaklun-K, Morok, Palianytsia, Sting, Tupolev Tu-141, Tupolev Tu-143, Sypaq Corvo (conversion), Blyskavka, Mugin-5, A-22 Foxbat (conversion), Skyranger Nynja (conversion), Batyar, UAS SETH, Sichen, Martian-2, Bars, Bulava, Hornet, Dart series, Anubis, Artemis ALM-20, Cooper, Darts, Rubaka
- Yemen (Houthis) – Qasef-1/2K, Samad-2/3, Shahed-101

== See also ==
- Boeing Persistent Munition Technology Demonstrator
- CIM-10 Bomarc
- Copperhead (UUV), a family of autonomous unmanned undersea vehicles with loitering munitions capability.
- Dynetics X-61 Gremlins
- Flying bomb
- Henschel Hs 117
- Low Cost Autonomous Attack System
- Shahed 238
- SSM-N-8 Regulus
- Sypaq Corvo Precision Payload Delivery System
- Television guidance
- V-1 flying bomb
- XM501 Non-Line-of-Sight Launch System
