= IAI Harpy NG =

Israeli loitering munition

Harop NG

General information
- Type: Loitering Munition
- National origin: Israel
- Manufacturer: IAI
- Designer: IAI
- Status: In service
- Primary user: Israel

History
- Developed from: IAI Harop

The IAI Harpy NG or IAI Harpy New Generation is a loitering munition produced by the Israel Aerospace Industries.

== Design ==
The Harpy NG is an anti-radiation drone and loitering weapon and is optimized for the SEAD operations. It has high explosive warhead and is a "fire and forget" autonomous weapon.

It can operate in all-weather day/night and it can be launched from a ground vehicle. It has 9 hours airborne time. Harpy improved in several ways from its predecessor, particularly in loiter time, range, altitude, maintenance and training. Also, it improved RF spectrum from 2–18 to 0.8–18 GHz.
