= ProMAQ HRESH =

HRESH

General information
- Type: Loitering Munition
- National origin: Armenia
- Manufacturer: ProMAQ
- Status: In service
- Primary user: Armed Forces of Armenia

HRESH (Armenian: Հրեշ, lit. 'monster'), also spelled as HREESH, is a loitering munition developed by the Armenian ProMAQ group.

== History ==
The HRESH was first unveiled at the ArmHiTec-2018 exhibition with several other loitering munitions, constituting the first-known loitering munitions produced in Armenia.

One Israeli news outlet noted the drone's resemblance to the Israeli Hero-30 drone.

== Specifications ==
- Crew: 0 (unmanned)
- Weight: 7 kg
- Capacity: 1.6 kg
- Max Ceiling: 1 km
- Range: 20 km

== Operators ==
- Armenia
  - Armed Forces of Armenia

== See also ==
- Granta X
- Granta Hornet
