= Zhubin =

Iranian loitering munition

External image
- https://www.janes.com/defence-news/news-detail/iran-displays-warmate-type-loitering-munition

Zhubin is an Iranian loitering munition in Iranian Navy and Army.
