= Aevex Phoenix Ghost =

American loitering munition

- Type: Loitering munition
- Place of origin: United States

Service history
- Wars: Russian invasion of Ukraine

Production history
- Manufacturer: Aevex Aerospace

Specifications
- Operational range: 6+ hour flight duration
- Guidance system: Autonomous; manual

The Aevex Phoenix Ghost is a family of aerial loitering munitions (explosive drones) designed by American company Aevex Aerospace. According to a senior US defense official, initial versions were broadly similar to the AeroVironment Switchblade, but later designs were larger and more capable.

== Capabilities ==
The Phoenix Ghost's primary purpose is to deliver an explosive munition to a human-selected target. The drone can loiter over an area for up to six hours, and can conduct surveillance. It is effective against medium-armored ground targets. It has infrared sensors for night operations.

In October 2024, Aevex revealed that Phoenix Ghost wasn't a single drone, but an effort that produced several designs of different sizes and configurations. Examples include:

- Atlas, a Group 2 drone weighing 20.9 lb (9.5 kg) including an 8.1 lb (3.7 kg) payload with endurance of 1-2 hours and range of 74 mi (120 km).
- Disruptor, a Group 3 drone with a v-tail 10.1 ft (3.1 m) in length weighing 185 lb (84 kg) or more with a 50 lb (23 kg) payload, endurance of 4.5 hours and range of 372 mi (598 km), launched pneumatically or through RATO. Closely resembles Iranian Shahed 101.
- Dominator, a Group 3 drone similar in size and launching method to Disruptor but in a twin-boom configuration, weighing 205 lb (93 kg) or more and having endurance of 4.6 hours and range of 293 mi (492 km).

== History ==
In April 2022, the United States Department of Defense stated that the Ghost was developed before the 2022 Russian invasion of Ukraine and that it was a "close match" for the needs of the Armed Forces of Ukraine in the battle of Donbas. It was later revealed that the Phoenix Ghost was a project under the Big Safari weapons program.

After initially sending 120 in April, it was announced in July 2022 that another 580 Phoenix Ghosts would be delivered beginning the next month as part of the Ukraine Security Assistance Initiative (USAI). The Phoenix Ghost weapons were provided via a procurement, unlike the other weapons the US provided to Ukraine in the early months following the invasion. A U.S. aid package announced in November 2022 included more than 1,100 Phoenix Ghosts.

At the height of deliveries, Aevex was shipping 230 loitering munitions to Ukraine each month. By December 2024, the company had delivered 5,000 drones to Ukraine.

== Operators ==
Map of current Phoenix Ghost operators

United States
United States Air Force

Ukraine
Armed Forces of Ukraine (at least 120 systems delivered by early May 2022; with training also underway by May 2022). A further 1,100 were delivered as part of an aid package in early November.
