= SRC Inc. =

Non-profit Research and Development Company in Syracuse, New York, U.S.

SRC, Inc.
- Company type: Not-for-profit
- Industry: Defense contractor
- Founded: 1960
- Headquarters: Syracuse, New York, U.S.
- Number of locations: Seven locations: Colorado; Maine; Maryland; New York; Ohio; Texas; Virginia
- Key people: Kevin Hair (president)
- Number of employees: More than 1,100
- Website: srcinc.com

SRC Inc., formerly Syracuse Research Corporation, is an independent, not-for-profit research and development company in the defense, environment, and intelligence industries. SRC is chartered by the State of New York, with headquarters in North Syracuse, New York.

The company develops advanced radar, electronic warfare, communications systems; and conducts intelligence consulting and engineering, environmental chemistry, toxicology, and risk assessment.

== History ==
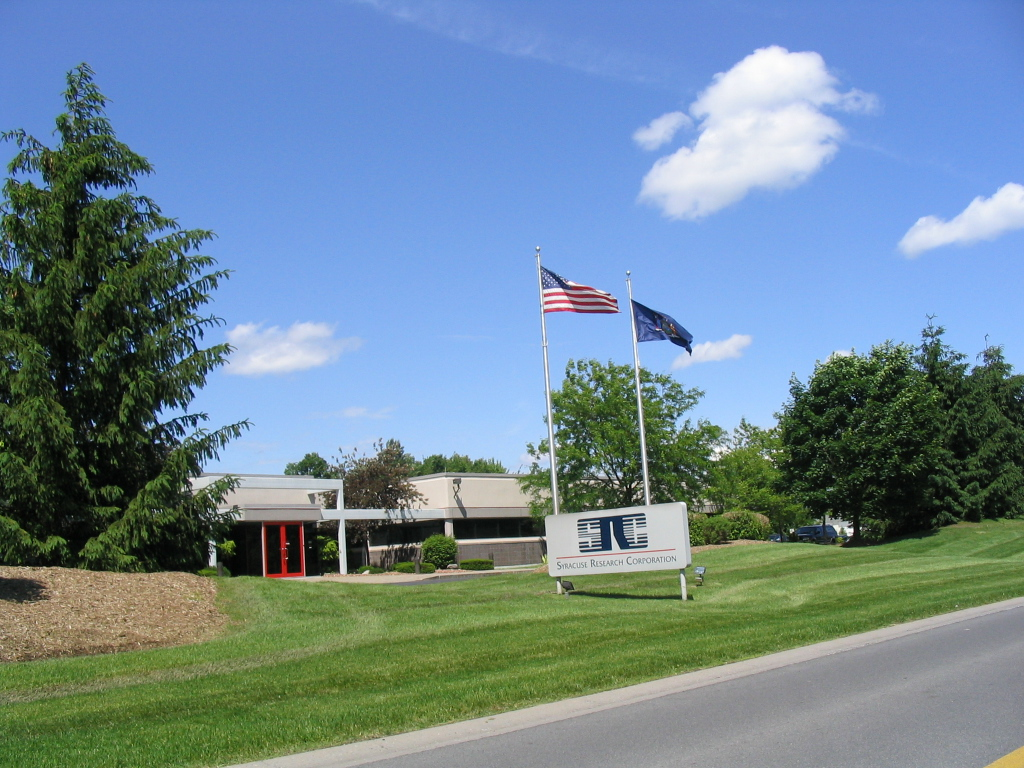
Syracuse Research Corporation headquarters in Cicero, New York

Syracuse Research Corporation was founded in 1957, as a not-for-profit arm of Syracuse University. The organization was formed to work on projects relative to America's national security. SRC provided Syracuse University's faculty with a vehicle to obtain grants and contracts, which could be used to pursue their research ideas. The company became an independent organization in the early 1970s. In 2008, SRC officially changed its name from Syracuse Research Corporation to SRC, Inc.

SRC's government research monies were exhausted in 1970–1971, and employment fell to about 150 employees within a year. In 1972, SRC spun off as a separate entity. The separation from the university was concluded in 1975.

For the next 20 years, SRC's employment fluctuated between 150 and 200. During this time, several high-tech businesses were spawned, including Anaren Microwave, Inc. and Leybold Inficon. SRC continued to grow steadily throughout the 1990s.

In 2006, SRC created SRCTec, an ISO 9001-registered subsidiary that provides manufacturing and logistics support for electronics systems.

SRC has offices in Colorado, Maine, Maryland, New York, Ohio, Texas and Virginia. SRC employs more than 1,100 people.

== Industries served ==
SRC serves the defense, environment and intelligence industries, and is nationally recognized in the design, development and manufacture of advanced radar, electronic warfare and communications systems for land, sea, air and space applications.

SRC also services the environmental science industry by performing analysis of environmental and toxicological interactions and conducting research in environmental chemistry, toxicology and chemical risk assessment methodology. SRC also researches, develops and deploys intelligence solutions for national security.

SRCTec provides manufacturing and lifecycle support for electronics systems, including counter-fire radars, air-surveillance radars, counter-IED and ground surveillance radars.

SRC and SRCTec customers include the intelligence community, U.S. Department of Homeland Security, U.S. Department of Defense, U.S. Army, U.S. Air Force, U.S. Navy, U.S. Marines and the Environmental Protection Agency, as well as being a partner and team member with other government contractors.
