= Sypaq Corvo Precision Payload Delivery System =

Unmanned aerial vehicle

Precision Payload Delivery System (PPDS)
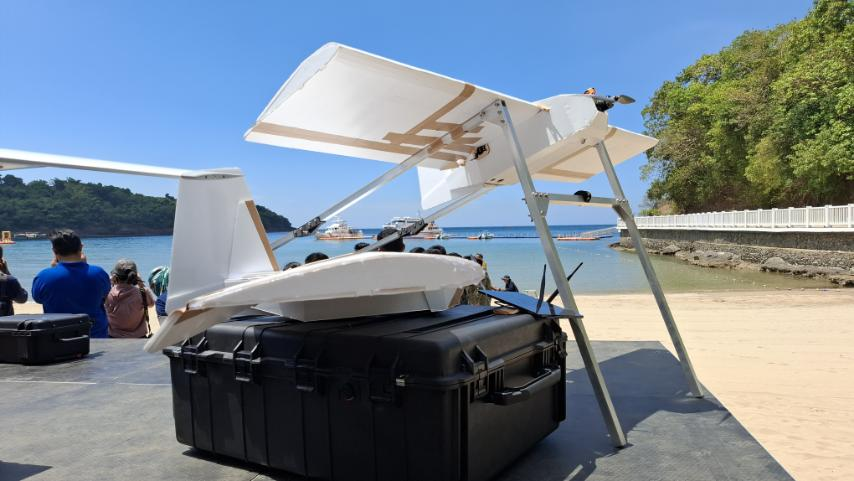
- Sypaq Corvo of the Philippine Coast Guard

General information
- Type: Unmanned aerial vehicle
- National origin: Australia
- Manufacturer: Sypaq Systems
- Status: In service
- Primary user: Ukrainian Ground Forces

The Corvo Precision Payload Delivery System (PPDS) is a small aerial drone originally intended for logistics, weighs 2.4 kg (5.3 lb) empty, and delivers payloads of up to 3 kg (6.6 lb).

The airframe is made of waxed foamcore (foamboard) and the drone is supplied as a self-assembly flatpack, complete with a tablet-PC control centre. It has a range of up to 120 km (75 mi). The PPDS can return and land for re-use, but its low cost means that it can also be treated as expendable.

The PPDS has been supplied to Ukraine, whose armed forces have customised it for other roles, including reconnaissance and attack. As of 2023, it is in active use in the Russo-Ukrainian War.

== History ==
SYPAQ Systems Pty Ltd is an Australian company founded in 1992. It manufactures a range of autonomous drones under the Corvo brand. The PPDS comprises a low-cost but military-grade system, capable of re-use but cheap enough to be treated as expendable when required.

The PPDS was initially developed in partnership with the Australian Army, under a contract worth $1.1 million. Army assembly trials took place in 2019.

As of March 2023 the PPDS is being supplied to Ukraine in quantity, in support of its war with Russia, under a funding initiative from the Australian government announced in July 2022. Operational use has led to its adaptation for additional roles, including intelligence, surveillance, reconnaissance and even lethal attacks.

On 27 August 2023 Ukrainian media, citing claims made by the Security Service of Ukraine, claimed that 16 PPDS had been used in an attack on the Kursk Vostochny Airport in Russia, with three shot down and the others targeting four Su-30 and one MiG-29 aircraft, a S-300 radar and two Pantsir air defence systems.

== Description ==
The PPDS airframe has a tailless but otherwise conventional layout. It is constructed from precision-cut waxed foamboard; the wax provides a good level of waterproofing and the PPDS can operate in wet weather. The individual parts are designed for ease of assembly by the user, being taped and glued together with the wings attached via heavy-duty rubber bands, as commonly done on model aircraft.

The square-section fuselage houses a tractor propeller in the nose and a single vertical fin at the tail. An internal payload bay allows for payloads of up to 3 kg (6.6 lb).

The propeller is electric powered, with the onboard lithium-ion battery allowing enough endurance to fly up to 120 km (75 mi) in total.

The onboard and ground command systems are based around commercial off-the-shelf (COTS) hardware and free open-source software (FOSS). Despite this, they are military grade.

These power and avionics systems are modular, and intended for re-use.

The ground command system comprises a ruggedised Android tablet which physically connects to the drone for entering of the flightpath. The drone then flies autonomously with no need for any datalink. It is capable of flying via dead reckoning based on its speed and heading, but will use GPS signals where available to improve accuracy.

The small size, foamboard construction and lack of communications link give the PPDS good stealth properties, making detection and interception extremely difficult. Its ability to navigate independently from GPS enables it to operate in a hostile electromagnetic environment with radio jamming. The flightpath details are encrypted, so that in the event of enemy capture, the location of the command controller cannot be identified.

The entire unit, including tablet, is supplied in flatpack form, and in volume quantities may be palletised for delivery. Assembly is simple, using only the basic tools supplied in the flatpack, such as sticky tape and rubber bands.

The PPDS is launched from a catapult comprising a lightweight frame, integrated launch rails and spring-loaded spool. The catapult is supplied separately.

The PPDS costs $1,000–$5,000 Australian dollars ($670–$3,350 USD).

== New Heavy Lift Model (PPDS-HL) ==
The PPDS-HL model is a larger version of the base model that is optimised for use in a wide variety of roles in the modern battlespace. The system is capable of delivering supplies with two different payload carrying options. The primary configuration is designed to carry payloads inside the fuselage and landing the air vehicle and unloading the payload. The second payload carrying option utilises hardpoints on the wing, enabling external payloads to be carried and dropped from the air vehicle in flight.

The comms relay capability also provides support to uncrewed surface vessels (USV) and uncrewed ground vehicles (UGV) that require range extension and supports the extension and resilience of broader battlefield communication networks.

PPDS-HL is capable of carrying lightweight Intelligence, Surveillance and Reconnaissance (ISR) payloads. The PPDS-HL has sufficient payload capacity to carry simultaneously the ISR payload and lightweight external stores for multirole missions.

Other roles include high-resolution photo mapping, acting as a decoy or target for testing. In large numbers, the PPDS-HL can form a swarm to generate combat mass and confuse and distract the enemy.

== Specifications ==
General Characteristics and Performance
Model	PPDS	PPDS-HL
Wingspan	2 m (6.6 ft)	2.8 m (9.2 ft)
Empty Weight	2.4 kg (5.3 lb)	2.4 kg (5.3 lb)
Payload	2.4 kg (5.3 lb)	6 kg (13 lb)
MTOW	13 kg (29 lb)	-
Speed	60 km/h (37 mph)	60 km/h (37 mph), dash up to 100 km/h (62 mph)
Range	40–120 km (25–75 mi)	80 km (50 mi) with 6 kg payload, 200 km (120 mi) with 3 kg payload
Duration	1–3 hours	-
