= IAI Harop =

Israeli stealth loitering munition

Harop
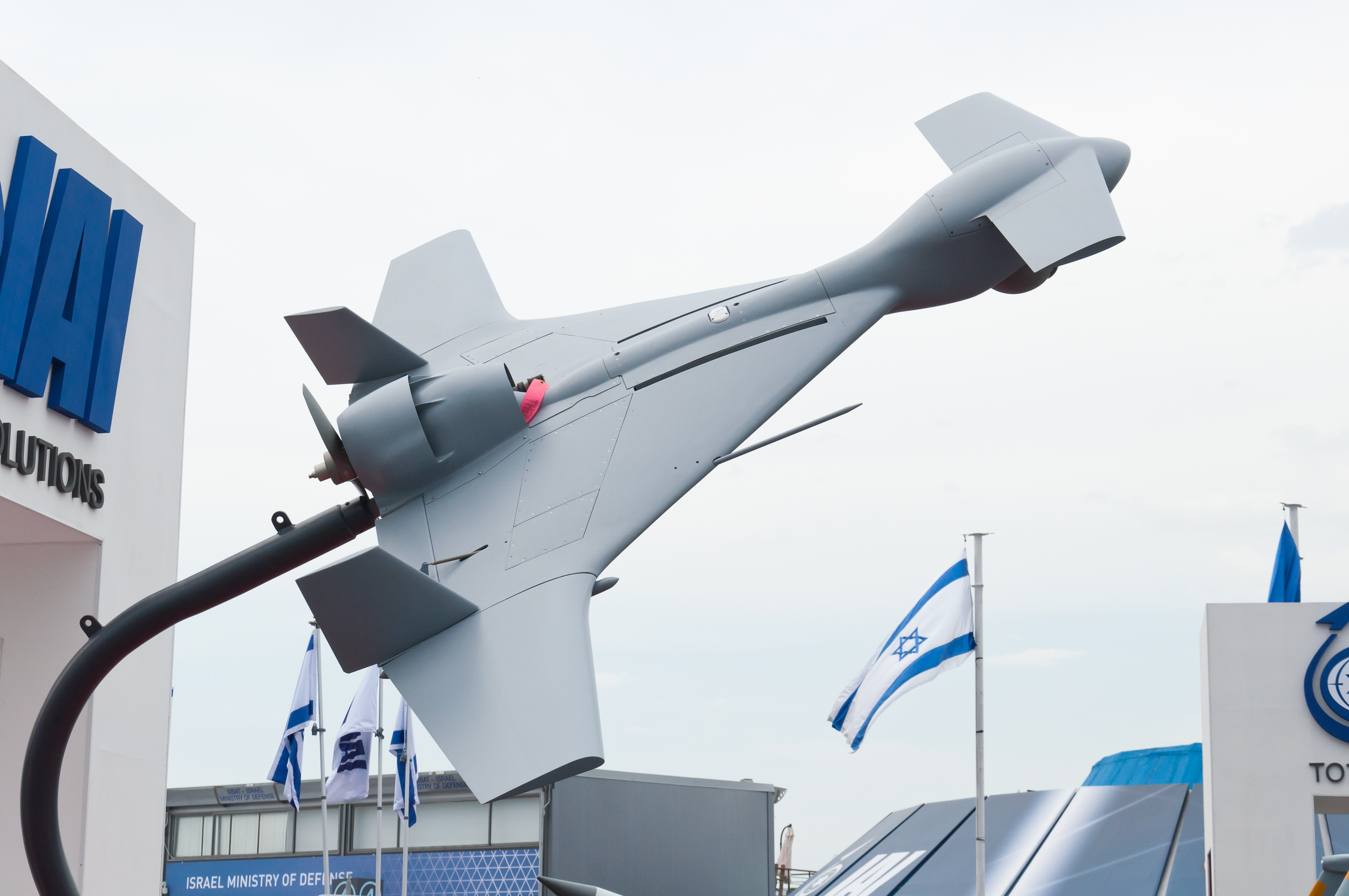
- IAI Harop at Paris Air Show 2013

General information
- Type: Loitering munition
- National origin: Israel
- Manufacturer: Israel Aerospace Industries

History
- Developed from: IAI Harpy

The IAI Harop is a loitering munition (LM) developed by the MBT Missiles Division of Israel Aerospace Industries.

== Design ==
The Harop loitering munition combines the advantages of a missile and an Unmanned Air Vehicle (UAV).

The Harop is launched from a canister, reaches a "holding area" where it may loiter for hours conducting critical Intelligence, Surveillance and Reconnaissance (ISR) for the mission. Once it finds its target, the Harop proceeds to the attack phase, detonating itself on the target.

The Harop uses a man-in-the-loop control mode which is operated by a remote mission operator. The Harop operator can select static or moving targets detected by the aircraft's electro-optical (EO) sensor. The IAI Harop has an endurance of over 6 hours of flight and a range of 200 km.

== Variants ==
=== Mini Harop ===
IAI developed a smaller version of the Harop for more tactical missions and ranges, naming the product Mini Harop.

The Mini Harop is designed to be launched out of canisters on tactical military vehicles like the Joint Light Tactical Vehicle (JLTV) and has a mission endurance of 1 hour.

The Mini Harop is typically used against time-critical targets or targets that hide and re-appear.

== History ==
The Harop is used widely across the globe and has garnered many operational successes. Allegedly Turkey may have been the launch customer for the Harop in 2005.

In October 2005, MBDA submitted the Harop (under the name "White Hawk") to the United Kingdom's Ministry of Defence for consideration as the system for the Ministry's Loitering Munition Capability Demonstration (LMCD-KG) program, otherwise known as "Fire Shadow". The Harop was selected as one of the finalists, but the UK MoD ultimately chose a locally manufactured solution.

In August 2007, the government of India was negotiating to purchase eight to ten Harop systems. In September 2009, the Indian Air Force announced that it will be inducting the Harop systems purchased for US$100 million. The Harop was publicly unveiled to the world for the first time in India, in the lead-up to the Aero India 2009 show. In February 2019, the Indian Air Force decided to add another 54 Harop drones to its fleet of around 110 of these drones, which they had renamed P-4. The Harop was also bought by several unnamed customers and remains a key asset for country defense strategies.

== Combat history ==
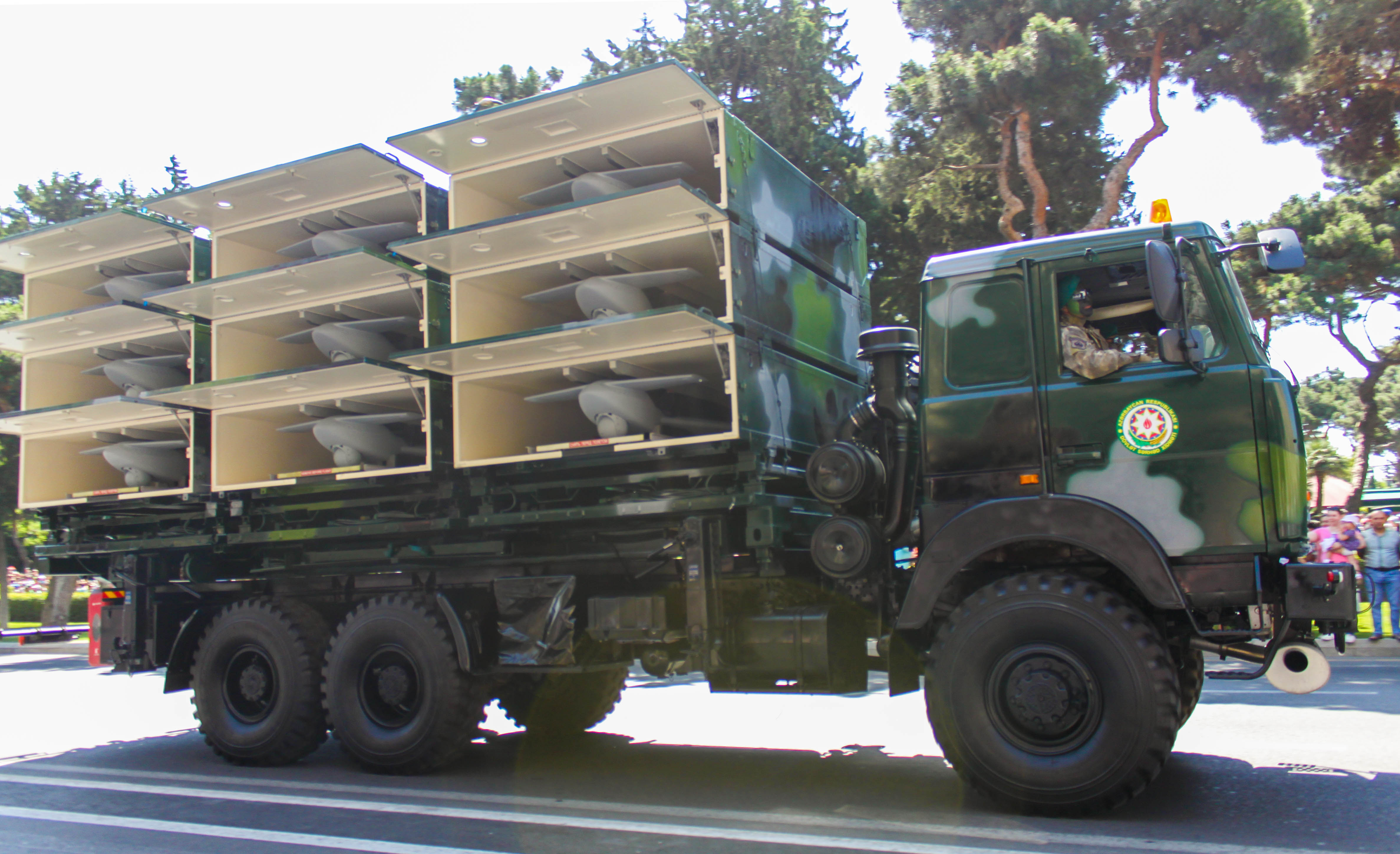
Launch containers for nine Harops on MAZ-6317 truck in Azerbaijani service

Harop is most widely recognized for its combat effectiveness in Azerbaijan in the Nagorno-Karabakh conflict in April 2016. IAI Harop loitering munition was used with success to take out military threats in extremely difficult operating conditions, including freezing temperatures, shallow and steep dives, and GPS jammed zones. In 2020, Hikmet Hajiyev, an advisor to Azerbaijani President Ilham Aliyev, praised the effectiveness of the Harop in the 2020 Nagorno-Karabakh conflict.

In addition to Nagorno-Karabakh, the Harop was also credited for destroying a Syrian Air Defence SA-22 Greyhound on 10 May 2018.

On 9 December 2024, Harop was used in an attack on Syrian Armed Forces within Syria.

=== 2025 India–Pakistan conflict ===
During the May 2025 conflict between India and Pakistan, India used multiple Israeli-origin drones, including Harop, to target military installations at Pakistani cities including Karachi, Lahore, and Rawalpindi. Pakistan claimed to have destroyed most of the drones.

== Operators ==
- Azerbaijan
- India
- Israel
- Netherlands: Acquisition announced for use on Amphibious & Multi-Support Ships by the Koninklijke Marine
- Morocco
- North Korea: Unlicensed copy (alongside the Hero 400)

== Specifications ==
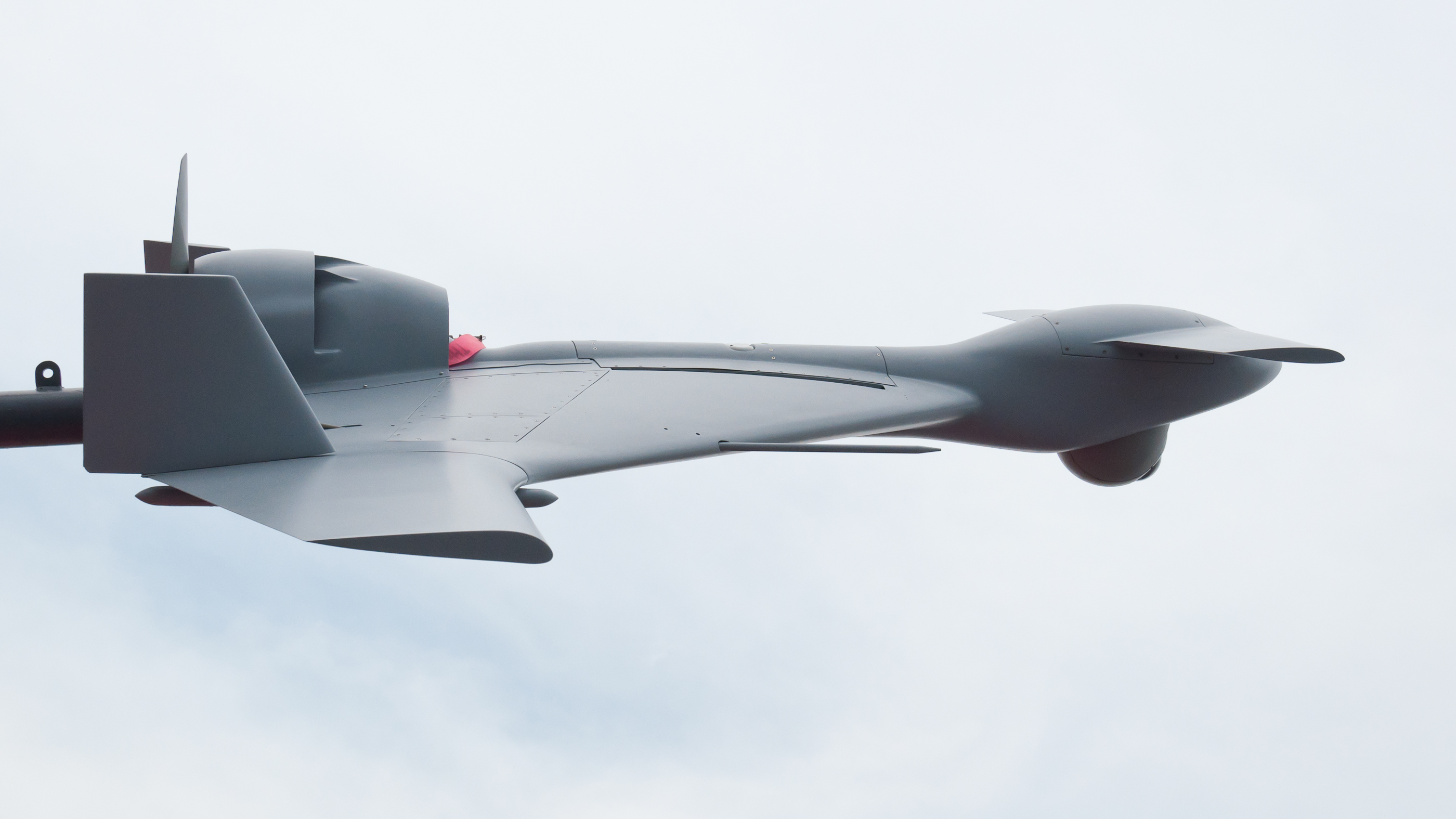
Side view

Data from FlightGlobal, IAI

General characteristics

- Crew: None
- Length: 2.5 m (8 ft 2 in)
- Wingspan: 3.00 m (9 ft 10 in)
- Communication range: 200 km (120 mi)
- RCS: < 0.5 m^{2}

Performance

- Maximum speed: 417 km/h (259 mph, 225 kn)
- Range: 200 km (120 mi, 110 nmi)
- Endurance: 6+ hours
- Service ceiling: 4,600 m (15,000 ft)

Armament

- 16 kg (35 lb) warhead
- CEP: < 1 m (3 ft 3 in) with 16 kg (35 lb) warhead

== See also ==
- IAI Harpy
- SEAD
- UCAV
