= UVision Air =

Israeli defence company

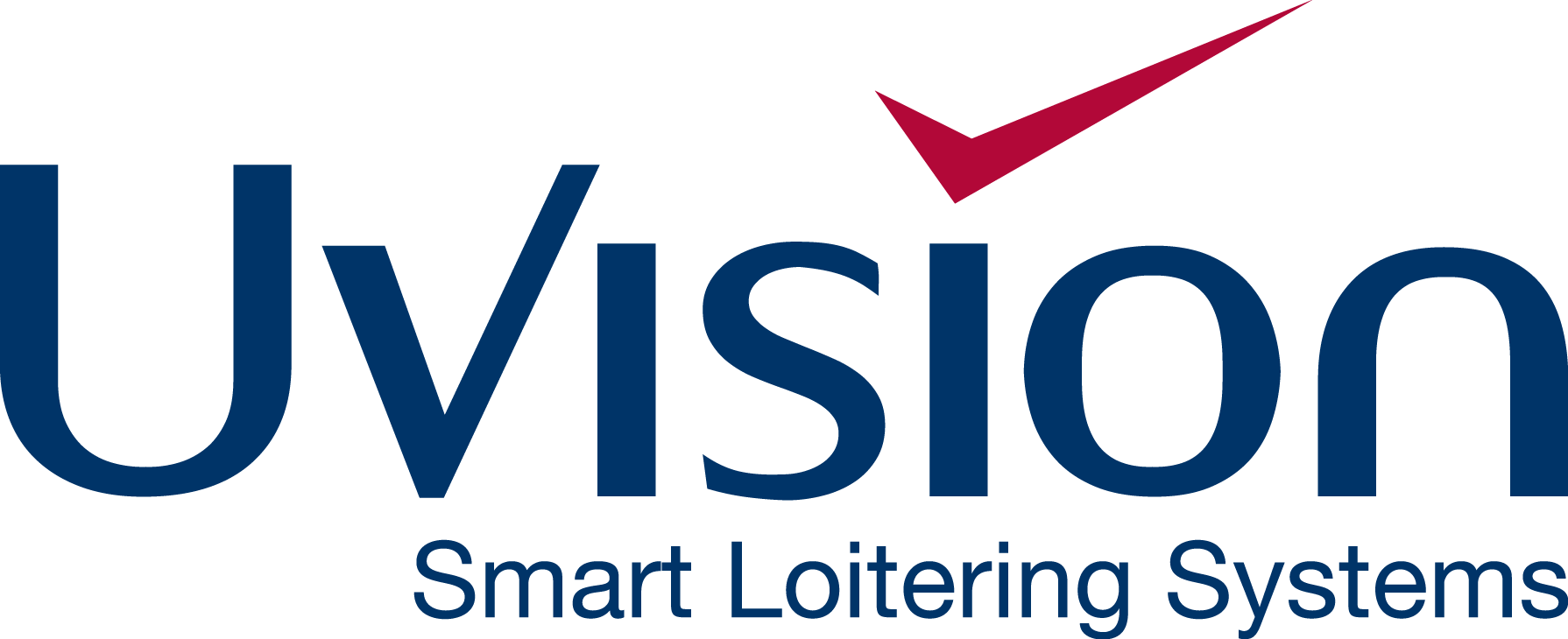
- Type: Private Company
- Industry: Military and Defense
- Founded: 2011; 15 years ago
- Headquarters: Emek Hefer Industrial Park, Israel
- Key people: Dr. Ran Gozali (CEO); Yair Ramati, Chairman of the Board of Directors; Yedidya Ya'ari;Yair Dubester
- Products: Advance missiles, Loitering munition systems, drones and UAVs
- Number of employees: 300 (2025)
- Subsidiaries: RDC (RAFAEL Development Corporation)
- Website: uvisionuav.com

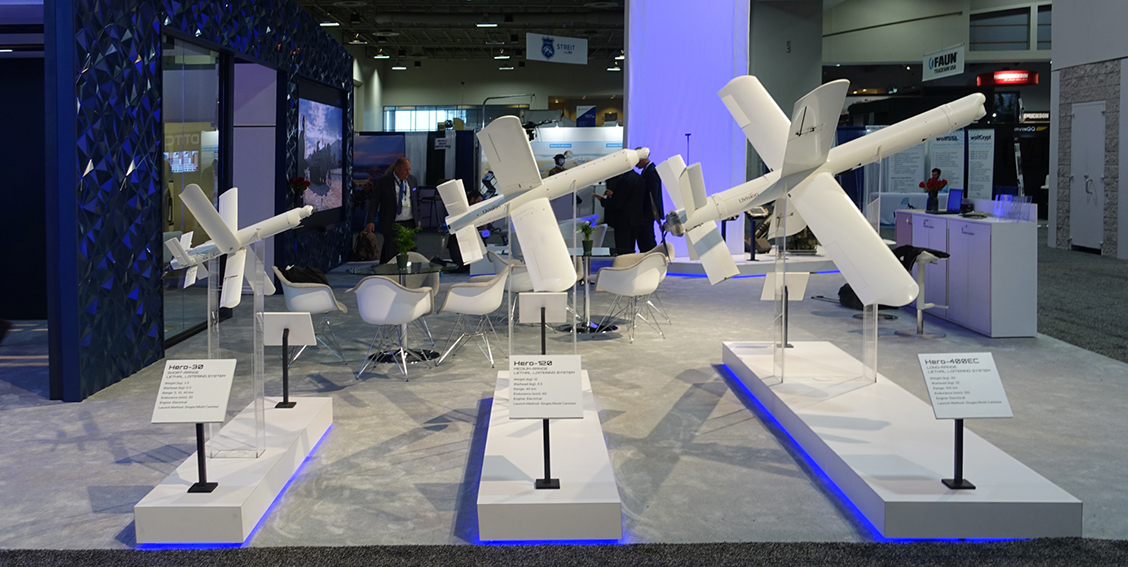
UVision at the AUSA, Washington, USA

UVision Air Ltd. is an Israeli defense technology company established in 2011. It engaged in the development, manufacturing and sales of advance missiles and loitering munition systems for land, air, and naval military forces. The company's products, called HERO, are designed for targeted attacks against a variety of threats at various ranges.

Uvision is owned by businessman Aaron Frenkel, who acquired control of it through the Magnus company.

In 2015 Yair Naveh, former deputy IDF Chief of Staff, was appointed Chairman of the company.

The company established the UVision USA Corporation in Virginia, United States, and AVision Systems Private Ltd. in India.

In November 2025, the company acquired the Israeli startup SpearUAV.

== Loitering munition systems ==
UVision develops the HERO family of loitering systems. The HERO is a sensor-to-shooter system used for surveillance, target acquisition and attack of a variety of targets in the battlefield. The family of loitering systems supports several launch methods: from the ground by a single soldier, from a vehicle, and from a variety of aerial and naval platforms. The HERO flies to the target area, loiters above the point of interest, tracks, and attacks the target. It is operated remotely and controlled in real time by a communications system. The HERO is equipped with an electro-optical camera whose images are received by the command and control station.

== HERO product line ==
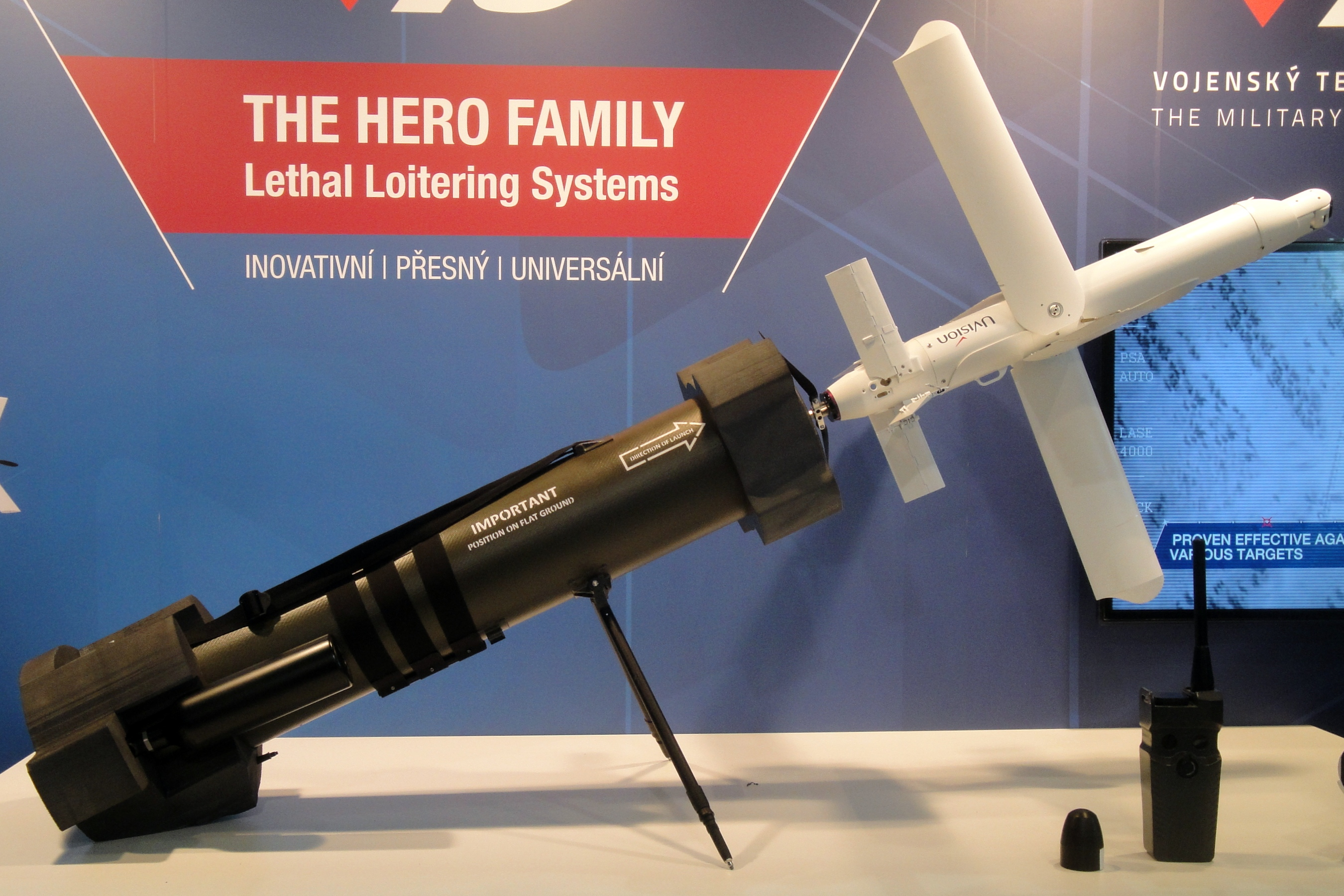
UVision Hero-30

- HERO-20 - manpack, portable short-range tactical loitering system.
- HERO-30 - manpack, portable short-range loitering munitions.
- HERO-70 - short-range loitering system used primarily for lightweight vehicle targets.
- HERO-120 - mid-range loitering system for personnel targets, lightweight vehicles, and antitank missions. 60 minutes loitering time.
- HERO-250 - long-range loitering munition system.
- HERO-400 - long-range loitering munition system for strategic targets and for missions where heavy ammunition is involved.
- HERO-900 - long-range & highly lethal loitering system for strategic missions.
- HERO-1250 - long-range & highly lethal loitering munition system for long-range strategic missions.
- HERO-R - man-portable rotary-wing loitering munition intended for use in close-combat situations.

== See also ==
- AeroVironment Switchblade – (United States)
- Raytheon Coyote – (United States)
- ZALA Lancet – (Russia)
