= ZALA Lancet =

Russian loitering munition

Lancet
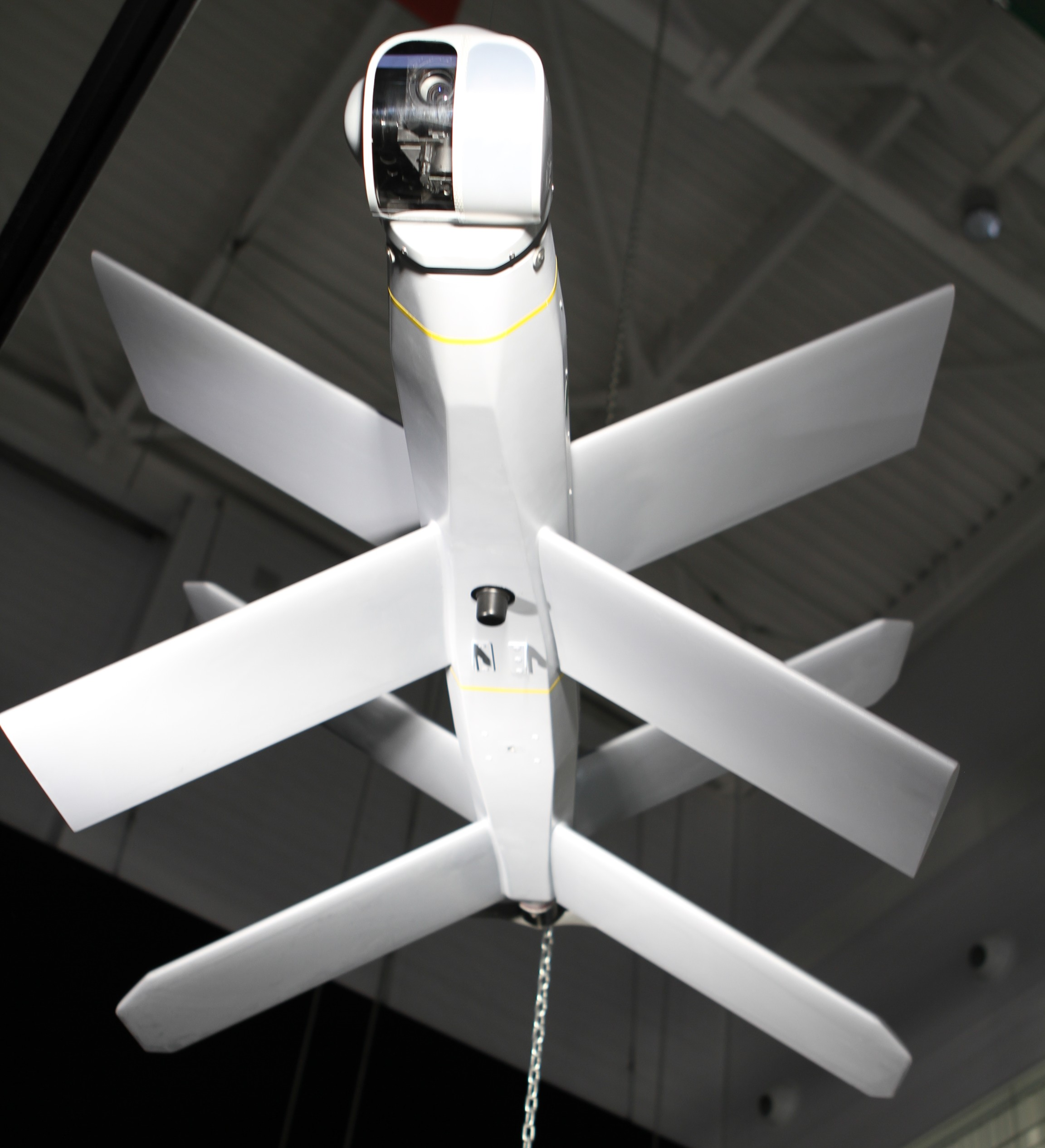
- Lancet, front view
- Type: Loitering munition
- Place of origin: Russian Federation

Service history
- In service: 2020 – present
- Used by: Russian Armed Forces
- Wars: Syrian civil war Russo-Ukrainian war

Production history
- Designer: ZALA Aero Group
- Unit cost: Export cost: 3 million rubles ($37,000)

Specifications
- Maximum speed: 110 km/h cruise, 300 km/h dive

The ZALA Lancet (official designation: Item 52/Item 51) is an unmanned aerial vehicle (UAV) and loitering munition developed by the Russian company ZALA Aero Group (part of Kalashnikov Concern) for the Russian Armed Forces. It was first unveiled in June 2019 at the ARMY-2019 military expo in Moscow. It is a further development of the ZALA Kub-BLA (also known as KYB-UAV) loitering munition.

== Description ==
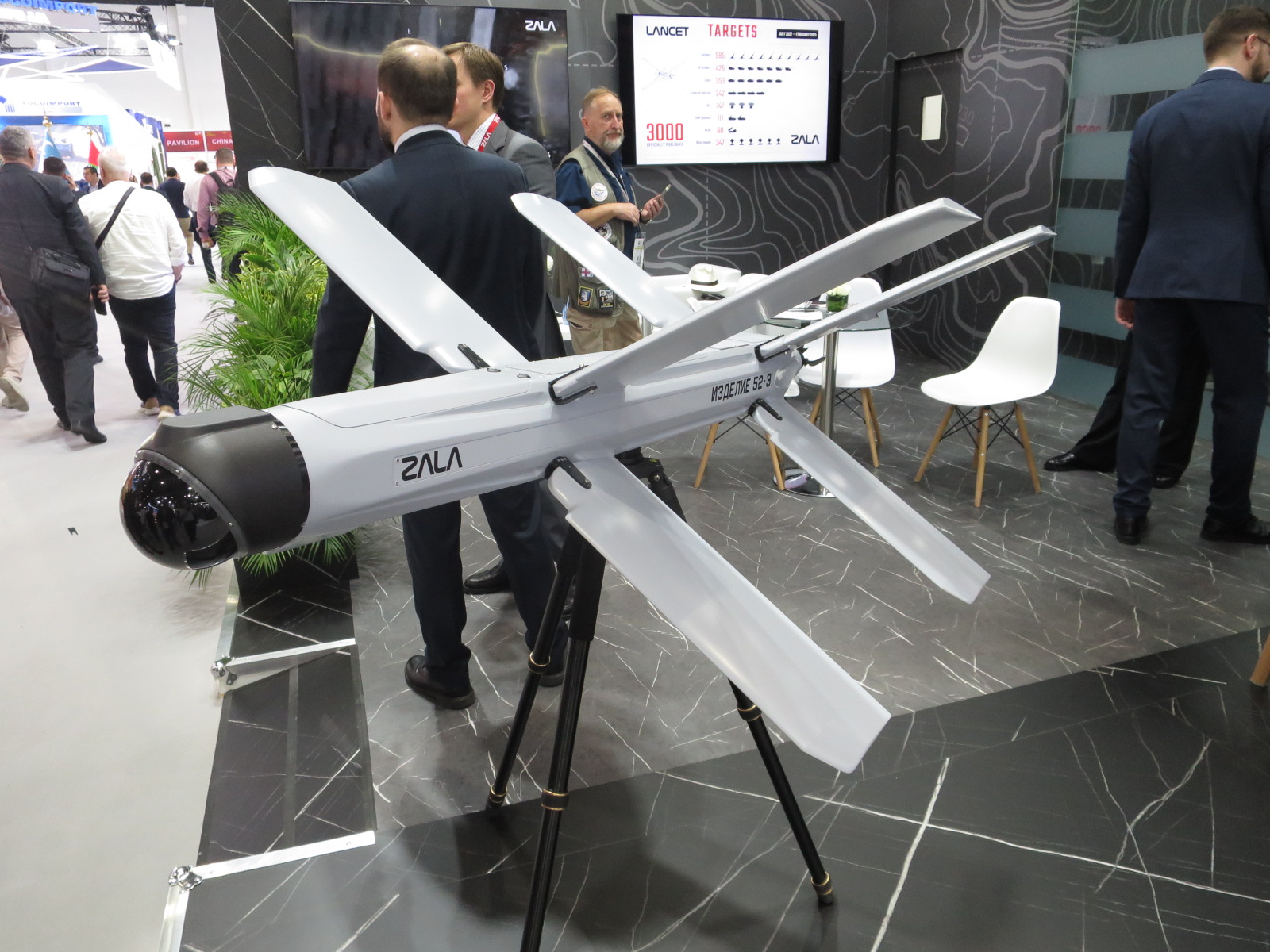
ZALA Lancet, side view

The ZALA Lancet can be used for both reconnaissance and strike missions. It has a maximum range of 40 kilometres (25 mi) and a maximum takeoff weight (MTOW) of up to 12 kilograms (26 lb). In combat mode, it can be armed either with high explosive (HE), HE-fragmentation or shaped charge warheads. It features optical-electronic guidance and TV guidance unit, which allows the munition to be controlled during the terminal stage of flight. The drone features intelligence, navigation and communications modules. According to Zala Aero Chief Designer Alexander Zakharov, the Lancet can be used in so called "air mining" role. In this role, the drone dives at maximum speed up to 300 kilometres per hour (190 mph) and strikes enemy unmanned combat aerial vehicles (UCAVs) mid-flight. Lancet can be launched via catapult launcher from ground or sea platforms like the Raptor-class patrol boats. The drone is powered by an electric motor.

ZALA drones use radio frequencies in the bands 868-870 MHz and 902-928 MHz. Lancet operates on two frequency channels with a reserve frequency to complicate jamming, and they can interface with communication relay UAVs.

It is estimated to cost about 3 million rubles ($35,000).

The Lancet contains many Western electronic components, including the Jetson TX2 module by NVIDIA used as its onboard control equipment and the Xilinx Zynq SoC module by Xilinx, an American company owned by AMD, used for implementing programmable logic.

A new disposable portable launcher completed combat testing and is in series production as of January 2026 allowing a single person to launch the munition.

== Operational history ==
=== Syrian Civil War ===
The Lancet has been combat tested in Syria during the Russian military intervention in the Syrian civil war since at least November 2020. In April 2021, it was engaged in strikes against Tahrir al-Sham in the Idlib Governorate.

=== Russian invasion of Ukraine ===
External videos
- ZALA Lancet: Top 100 strikes of 2024 on ZALA Aero Telegram channel

On 8 June 2022, Russian defence corporation Rostec announced that Lancet and KUB drones were deployed during the ongoing Russian invasion of Ukraine. A month later, the first video of their combat use in Ukraine emerged. In late 2022, multiple videos appeared on social networks showing Lancet drones striking a variety of Ukrainian military targets, such as air defence systems, self-propelled howitzers, tanks and military trucks. Among the targets damaged or destroyed were S-300 missile systems, a Buk-M1 missile system, a T-64 tank, Western-supplied M777 and FH70 howitzers, as well as M109, AHS Krab and CAESAR self-propelled howitzers. On 4 November 2022, a Gyurza-M-class gunboat of the Ukrainian Navy was damaged by a Lancet drone, in what was the first time a Lancet attacked a naval target during the war.

While Russia uses long-range Iranian Shahed-136 kamikaze drones against Ukrainian energy infrastructure, the Lancet is employed as a precision battlefield weapon against high-value military targets, usually located by a reconnaissance drone before it gets launched. Although the Lancet is recorded to have hit a number of Ukrainian targets, there are also some misses. Even if it strikes its target it does not guarantee a kill, sometimes only causing minor damage that can be repaired. According to Forbes, Russia may be prevented from producing Lancets in large numbers due to international sanctions, as Russian drones are dependent on imported electronics and they are having difficulties in finding alternatives. However, in July 2023, television news footage showed a massive new facility with hundreds of Lancets being manufactured as the makers claimed that production was being tripled.

In February 2023, a Lancet drone targeted and struck a rare Ukrainian T-84 tank. In March 2023, a British-supplied Stormer HVM air-defence system was struck by a Lancet drone for the first time.

According to Dutch open-source intelligence website Oryx, as of 3 March 2023, Lancet drones scored more than 100 hits on Ukrainian targets during the war. Most of the targets were towed artillery and self-propelled artillery systems. A Russian source also made claims about the high efficiency of the drone.

On 18 April 2023, reports emerged of the destruction of a Ukrainian patrol boat on the Dnipro River after being struck by a Lancet drone. On 27 April 2023, video emerged confirming a Lancet strike on a Ukrainian Tor SAM system. The same day, other videos showing Lancet drones destroying one 5P85S launcher for the S-300 missile system, and damaging another, appeared on social networks.

On 19 September 2023, Russian sources claimed a Lancet, for the first time, conducted a strike against a Ukrainian MiG-29 fighter stationed at Dolgintsevo airfield near Kryvyi Rih in the Dnipropetrovsk region, some 70 km from the front line on the Dnieper River, indicating the maximum range of the drone had been enhanced from the previously-declared 40 km. The MiG was reportedly hit near the cockpit. On 11 October 2023, another video showcased the Lancet striking a parked Ukrainian Su-25 at Dolgintsevo airfield.

According to LostArmour, as of 3 October 2023, Russia conducted a total of 667 Lancet strikes on various Ukrainian weaponry since July 2022. Among these, 210 targets (31%) were destroyed, while 355 targets (53%) suffered substantial damage. The drone failed to strike a target in 48 instances, and outcomes remained unconfirmed for 52 sorties. Nearly half of the Lancet's engagements focused on artillery installations, encompassing 142 self-propelled cannons (64% of Ukrainian self-propelled gun losses), 170 howitzers and mortars, and few dozens of MLRS launchers. 25% percent of the targets comprised tanks and lighter armored vehicles, 10% were motor vehicles and other relatively low-value targets. Another 14% of the targets were very high value: surface-to-air missile launchers and radar systems.

According to LostArmour, as of 28 February 2024, Russia conducted a total of 1,163 Lancet strikes on various Ukrainian weaponry since July 2022. Among these, 363 targets (31.2%) were destroyed, while 615 targets (52.9%) suffered substantial damage. The drone failed to strike a target in 92 instances, and outcomes remained unconfirmed for 91 sorties. Nearly half of the Lancet's engagements focused on artillery installations, encompassing 255 self-propelled cannons, 272 howitzers and mortars, and 34 MLRS launchers. 197 targets were tanks, 118 were lighter armored vehicles and 10 were ships. 10% targets were motor vehicles and other relatively low-value targets. Another 14% of the targets were very high value: surface-to-air missile launchers and radar systems.

On 1 November 2023, the British Ministry of Defence stated that the Lancet was highly likely to be one of the most effective new capabilities deployed by Russia in Ukraine over the previous 12 months. Then Ukrainian commander-in-chief, General Valerii Zaluzhnyi, wrote that Russia was deploying Lancets "widely and effectively" and said countering them was "quite difficult."

LostArmour tracked an unprecedented 285 Lancet strikes in 29 days of May 2024 (1-29 May), more than any other month, and several times greater than in previous years. This rise reflected the growing drone production capabilities of the Russian defense industry during the war.

== Variants ==
Lancet-3
Basic and bigger variant with a 40-minute endurance with a maximum payload of three kilograms (6.6 lb) and a 12 kg (26 lb) MTOW. The maximum speed is 80–110 kilometres per hour (50–68 mph).
Lancet-1
A smaller version of the Lancet-3. It carries a one-kilogram (2.2 lb) payload and has a 5 kg (11 lb) MTOW. The endurance is 30 minutes.
Izdeliye-53 (or Product 53)
Upgraded version of the Lancet. The drones have a new tube launcher which can contain up to four Lancets and the drones can relay information between themselves about armored vehicles and their concentration and attack fully autonomously, choosing targets from pre-set categories. It has a maximum payload of five kilograms (11 lb). Its operational deployment begun in October 2023 against Czech-made Ukrainian artillery systems.

Russian troops in Ukraine have begun using upgraded Lancet loitering munitions with an increased flight duration of one hour and a more powerful warhead weighing more than five kilograms, which is at least two kilograms more than the basic version of the drone. Lancets are used to attack personnel with a high explosive fragmentation or thermobaric warhead, and armored vehicles with a high-explosive anti-tank (HEAT) warhead. The larger variant is designated Izdeliye 51, while the smaller one, with a three-kilogram warhead, is designated Izdeliye 52 and reportedly was upgraded with a larger warhead and a new EO guidance system as of March 2023.

== Countermeasures ==
During the Russo-Ukrainian war, Ukrainian forces began developing countermeasures in response to Russia's tactical use of Lancet drones on the battlefield. Ukrainian soldiers began building cages, also used by Russian soldiers and pejoratively referred to as "cope cages", around their artillery pieces using chain link fencing, wire mesh and even wooden logs as part of the construction. The cages were "mainly intended to disrupt Russian Lancet munitions", an analyst told Radio Liberty. A picture supposedly taken from January 2023 showed the rear half of a Lancet drone that failed to detonate due to such cages, showing that they occasionally succeeded in disrupting Lancet attacks. Ukrainian forces also had begun using inflatable and wooden decoys shaped like vehicles and weapons systems, such as HIMARS, to deceive and divert Lancet attacks.

Starting in 2024, Ukrainian forces began intercepting Lancet and other Russian drones with their own First Person View (FPV) drones at altitude, using diving attacks to knock the targets out of the air beyond recovery by the operator or foul their rotors.

== Operators ==
In November 2023, Aleksandr Mikheyev, the director of Russian state arms exporter Rosoboronexport, said Russia was not exporting the Lancet due to high domestic demand, specifically by the Russian Armed Forces. Export authorization was issued in February 2026.

Russia

- Russian Ground Forces

Unconfirmed:

Iran

- Islamic Republic of Iran Ground Forces: Iran claimed in April 2024 that it has manufactured a domestic analogue of the drone.

== See also ==
- AeroVironment Switchblade – (United States)
- UVision Hero – (Israel)
- RAM-2X – (Ukraine)
- Artillery observer
