= AeroVironment Switchblade =

American loitering missile

Switchblade 600 / Switchblade 300
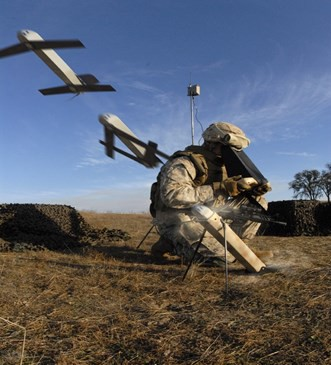
- Switchblade 300 launched by a US Marine
- Type: Loitering missile
- Place of origin: United States

Service history
- In service: 2011–present
- Used by: United States Army, United States Marine Corps, Armed Forces of Ukraine, Lithuanian Armed Forces, United States Navy
- Wars: War in Afghanistan (2001–2021); Operation Inherent Resolve in Iraq; Russo-Ukrainian war (2022–present)

Production history
- Designed: 2010
- Manufacturer: AeroVironment
- Produced: 2011–present
- Variants: Switchblade 300, Switchblade 600, Blackwing

Specifications
- Mass: 2.5 kg (5.5 lb) (Switchblade 300); 15 kg (33 lb) (Switchblade 600)
- Length: 49.5 cm (19.5 in) (Switchblade 300); 130 cm (51 in) (Switchblade 600)
- Diameter: 76 mm (3 in) (Switchblade 300); 150 mm (6 in) (Switchblade 600)
- Operational range: 10 km (6.2 mi) or 15 min (Switchblade 300); 40 km (25 mi) or 40 min (Switchblade 600)
- Flight altitude: <150 m (500 ft)
- Maximum speed: Model 300: 101 km/h (63 mph) (cruise); 160 km/h (100 mph) (dash); Model 600: 113 km/h (70 mph) (cruise); 185 km/h (115 mph) (dash)
- Guidance system: Autonomous; manual
- Launch platform: Portable tube; multipack; assorted vehicles

The AeroVironment Switchblade is a family of man-portable loitering munitions designed by AeroVironment and used by several branches of the United States military and also exported to other countries. Small enough to fit in a backpack, the Switchblade launches from a tube, flies to the target area, and crashes into its target while detonating its explosive warhead. The name Switchblade comes from how the spring-loaded wings are folded inside a tube and flipped out once released.

Introduced in 2011, the original Switchblade was rebranded the Switchblade 300 after the much larger and very different Switchblade 600 anti-armour variant was unveiled in 2020. The Blackwing, an unarmed variant of the Switchblade 300, was released in 2015. More than 700 Switchblade 300 drones were sent to Ukraine by the United States as part of an arms package after the 2022 Russian invasion of Ukraine.

== History ==
Designed by the United States Air Force Special Operations Command (AFSOC) and developed by the United States Army, the Switchblade was designed to assist US troops in responding to enemy ambushes in Afghanistan. Close air support takes time to arrive, is costly to operate, and risks collateral damage in urban areas. Troop-carried guided missiles, such as the FGM-148 Javelin, are also significantly larger, heavier, and more expensive, and only a few, if any, are carried on a typical patrol. Human-portable unmanned aerial vehicles (UAVs) like the Raven or Puma can spot threats but lack weapons. The backpackable, relatively inexpensive Switchblade has sensors to help spot enemy fighters and an explosive warhead to attack them from above, which is especially helpful in dug-in positions like rooftops or ridge lines.

On July 29, 2011, the U.S. Army awarded AeroVironment a $4.9 million contract for "rapid fielding" of an unspecified number of Switchblades to forces in Afghanistan. On March 20, 2012, the Army added $5.1 million, totaling $10 million.

In May 2012, the United States Marine Corps began ordering Switchblades to allow troops to strike improvised explosive device (IED) emplacement teams and similar targets. Usually, when air support is called in, attackers slip away before a large UAV, attack helicopter, fighter bomber, or quick reaction force can arrive at the station. Marines sometimes couldn't get support due to other units getting mission priority. The Switchblade is small enough to fit in a Marine's ALICE or MOLLE pack and locks onto and tracks a target once selected.

In late 2012, 75 Switchblades were supplied to U.S. soldiers in Afghanistan. Several successful employments had occurred by January 2013. Although the military would not confirm details about its deployment, effectiveness, distribution, or tactical employment, commanders reported that it was "very effective." Shortly after, the Army theatre commanders requested a joint urgent needs statement for more systems. The number requested was not specified but was "dramatically more" than the 75 systems initially supplied and exceeded budget limitations. The Switchblade gained notoriety among soldiers using it and insurgents targeted by it. The Army classifies it as a direct-fire munition rather than a drone.

Soldiers embraced it as a valuable tool, especially to reduce collateral damage. Unlike most other weapons, the Switchblade can wave off or abort a mission if the situation changes after launch, allowing it to engage a secondary target or destroy itself without inflicting casualties or property damage. Wave off was used over a dozen times to prevent civilian casualties that could have been caused had a person not been in the decision loop.

On August 28, 2013, AeroVironment announced it had been awarded five contracts totaling $15.8 million to supply more Switchblade systems, ancillary equipment, and support to the Army. One week later, the Pentagon gave the company a follow-on contract worth $6.6 million. On September 5, 2013, AeroVironment was awarded a $29 million contract modification to supply Switchblade munitions systems and associated hardware and support services, totaling $51.4 million worth in contracts announced over nine days.

In April 2015, the Marines test-fired a Switchblade from the back of an MV-22 Osprey. The drone was not equipped with a warhead but was successfully released and accurately steered toward a target. The test showed that the Switchblade could be air-launched from the aircraft and add a remotely controlled, weaponized surveillance tool to the Osprey. From its introduction to the end of Operation Enduring Freedom, over 4,000 switchblades were deployed in Afghanistan. In mid-2017, 350 Switchblades were delivered to SOCOM for use against Islamic State.

On April 28, 2016, AeroVironment announced they had developed an upgrade for the Switchblade Tactical Missile System, designated Block 10C. In October 2016, AeroVironment announced the Multi-Pack Launcher (MPL), a system to carry and remotely launch several Switchblades.

In October 2020, AeroVironment announced a project with Kratos Defence & Security Solutions to demonstrate a "high-speed, long-range unmanned combat air vehicle" that serves as a mothership to deliver Switchblade 300s in large numbers that cooperatively attacks and overwhelms enemy defences.

In late 2018, AeroVironment was working on the larger Switchblade 600. In March 2020, AeroVironment revealed it had flight tested the product the previous year. In October 2020, AeroVironment unveiled the larger unit. By the time of its unveiling, it had undergone 60 test flights from ground launches against fixed and moving targets.

On March 31, 2021, AeroVironment was awarded a US$26.1 million contract by SOCOM for the Switchblade 600. The system addresses the United States Naval Special Warfare Command's Maritime Precision Engagement (MPE) requirement to engage asymmetric threats with Combatant Craft Medium (CCM) and Heavy (CCH) boats acting as host platforms.

In March 2022, it was reported that the US was considering providing Switchblade drones to the Ukrainian armed forces following the Russian invasion of Ukraine. On March 16, the White House announced that "100 Tactical Unmanned Aerial Systems" would be provided to Ukraine as part of an $800 million military aid package. Another 600 systems were announced to be sent in April, bringing the total number of munitions sent to Ukraine to 700.

Ukraine first reported using a Switchblade on a Russian target in Kharkiv Oblast in early May. A Switchblade 300 was used against a bunker; it is unclear if it was shot down or completed its task by exploding. Russian forces recovered the remains. Despite receiving hundreds of Switchblade drones, some Ukrainian units prefer to use commercial drones equipped with explosives that are easier to use. The U.S. planned to also send the anti-armour Switchblade 600, but although the Switchblade 300 was delivered soon after being pledged to Ukraine, the larger Switchblade 600 was not because it was still a prototype and not considered a fielded capability, so it had to complete testing and evaluation. While the Switchblade 300 has been used against soft Russian targets like fuel trucks, personnel carriers, machine gun nests, trench positions, and dismounted infantry, the Switchblade 600 can be used against heavy armour, including tanks. In October 2022, AeroVironment said the first batch of 10 Switchblade 600s would likely be in Ukraine "in the next few weeks." They were reportedly delivered by the end of the year, and were first used in combat in spring 2023.

Ukraine initially used the Switchblade-300, but the system's use gradually declined because Russia improved its air defense and electronic warfare systems. Jamming is likely responsible for the majority of drone losses in the conflict, and according to three unnamed Ukrainian officers in April and May 2023, Ukraine was losing 10,000 drones a month to Russian electronic-warfare systems that spoofed signals and interfered with their navigation. AeroVironment later improved the Switchblade 600's resistance to jamming through software updates and better operator training.

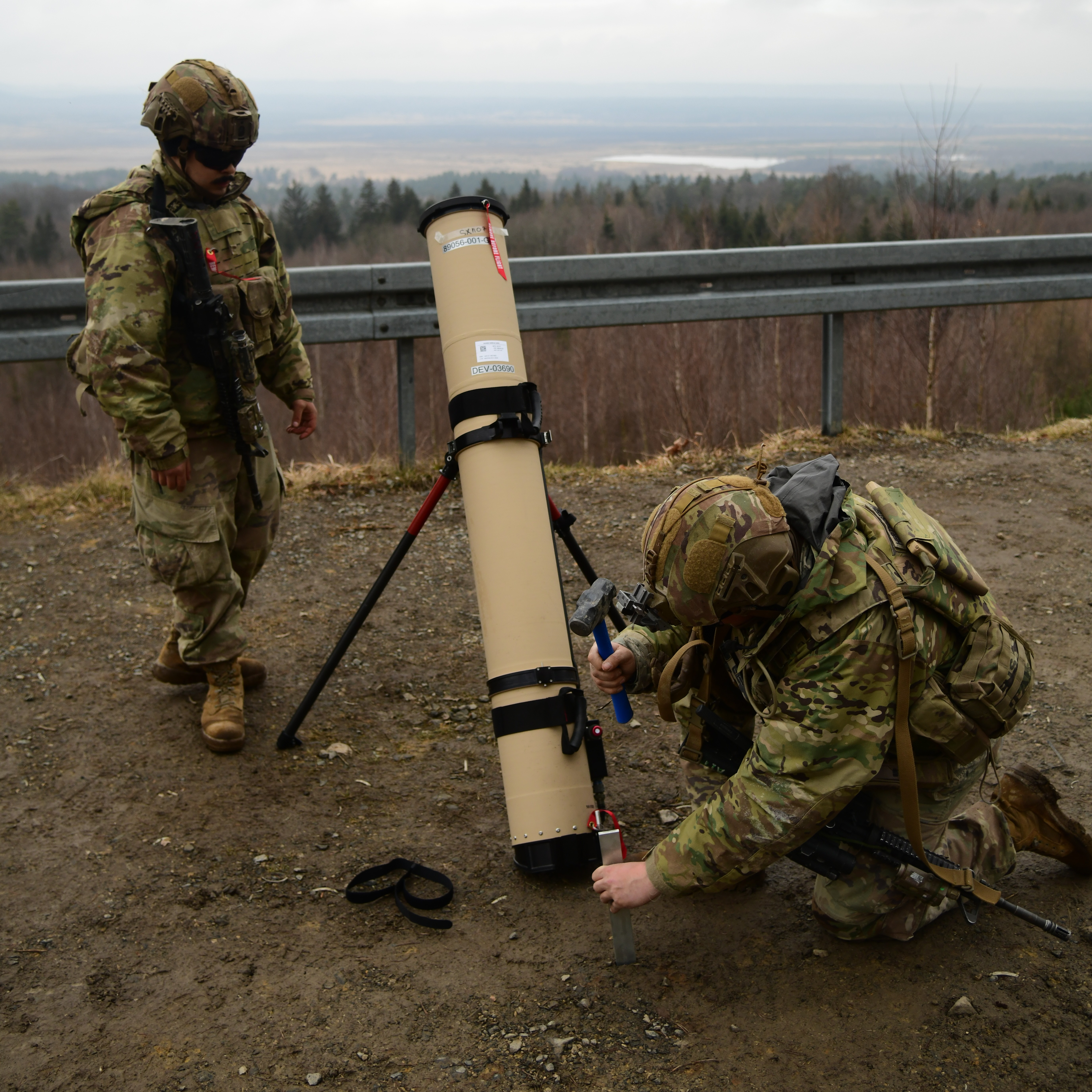
Low Altitude Stalking and Strike Ordnance (LASSO)

The U.S. Army ordered more than 100 Switchblade 600s in October 2023 as part of the first increment of the Low Altitude Stalking and Strike Ordnance (LASSO) program; they will be operated at company-level.

On June 11, 2024, a Switchblade, believed to be a 600 or improved model, struck a Russian Buk missile launcher in Sarabash (formerly Komunarivka), Donetsk. The drone had to "travel more than 30 kilometers".

In August 2024, the U.S. Army awarded AeroVironment a contract worth nearly $1 billion to deliver Switchblade 300 and 600 drones over the next five years.

On February 26, 2026, AeroVironment announced receipt of a $186 million delivery order from the U.S. Army for Switchblade 600 Block 2 and Switchblade 300 Block 20 - as part of the aforementioned $990 million "Indefinite Delivery, Indefinite Quantity" (IDIQ) contract.

== Design ==
=== Switchblade 300 ===
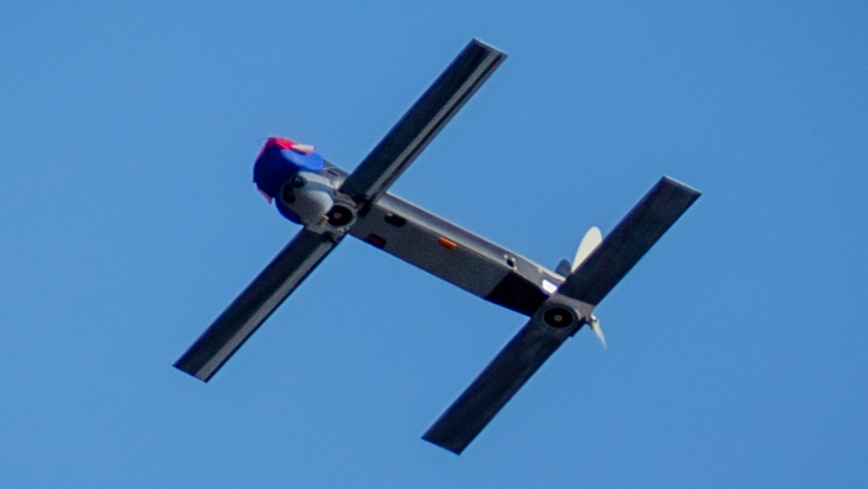
Switchblade 300 in flight

The Switchblade 300 is designed as an expendable UAV to offer precision firepower for platoon-sized infantry units.

It helps engage long-range targets and assists in relieving units pinned down by enemy fire. It can identify, track, and engage targets and follow a pre-programmed course.

It has been used to destroy light armoured vehicles and personnel. The operator can call to re-target a unit en route. Its small size and silent flight make it extremely difficult to detect or intercept.

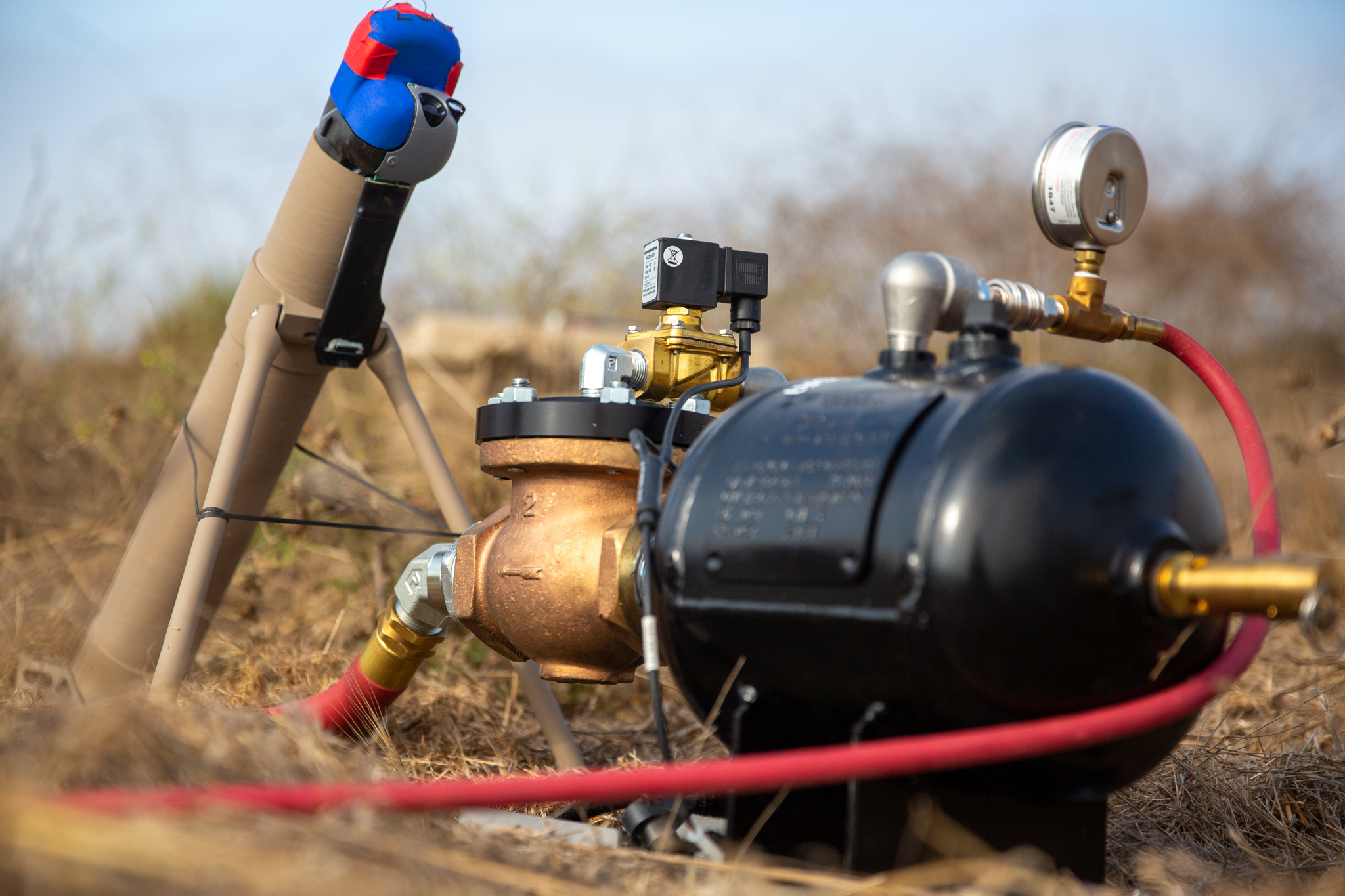
Launch unit for the Switchblade 300. Compressed air is used to expel the drone from the tube.

The Switchblade uses the same Ground Control Station (GCS) as other AeroVironment UAVs, including the Wasp, RQ-11 Raven, and RQ-20 Puma. This creates a commonality and the potential for teaming of longer-endurance small UAVs to recon for targets, then having the Switchblade attack once they are identified with the same controller.

The warhead is designed for controlled firepower to reduce collateral damage through a focused blast. It has a forward-firing shotgun-blast effect rather than a 360-degree blast, expelling pellets in the direction that the missile is traveling. It can be fused to detonate at a predetermined height, which can be adjusted mid-flight. When diving, the operator can cancel the attack until four seconds from impact. The warhead can be detonated mid-flight to destroy it.

The U.S. Army categorizes the Switchblade as a missile rather than a drone. The term "loitering munition" is preferred. Unlike UAVs, it is not recoverable once launched. Its operation is similar to the wireless TOW missile through a fly-by-radio frequency signal. The TOW doesn't loiter, but both have the same operator-in-the-loop characteristics.

The Switchblade does not fit into established doctrines since it is not an armed reconnaissance vehicle dispatched by a platoon commander to scout over an area and destroy enemies, or an intelligence, surveillance, and reconnaissance (ISR) platform, as its cameras are for viewing targets instead of recon. It meets the need for squads and platoons that lack high-level intelligence and communications to fire missiles beyond the ranges they are trying to influence.

SRC Inc. developed software to combine the Switchblade with sensors to intercept hostile UAVs. The Switchblade is used alongside an existing counter-artillery radar and IED jamming system, all of which can be towed by Humvees. Interception of an enemy drone occurs in layers: if a drone gets through covering fighters or is too small to be targeted by them, it is picked up by the fire-finding radar. Once detected, the jammer performs electronic warfare to break its data link. If the drone resists EW, a Switchblade is launched to impact and destroy it physically.

==== Block 10C ====
Each Block 10C unit is 2 ft (610 mm) long and weighs 6 lb (2.7 kg) including the carrying case and launcher, making it small and light enough for one soldier to carry. It can be controlled at distances of up to 10 km (6.2 mi). Flight time is 10 minutes. It is equipped with (daytime) color and infrared cameras and a GPS locator. Its warhead is equivalent to a 40 mm grenade. An electric motor propels the aircraft and can reach speeds of 85 knots (98 mph; 157 km/h).

The Switchblade uses daytime, as well as an "aided target tracker" to lock on to stationary and moving targets.

Block 10C incorporates a Digital Data Link (DDL) to provide a stable and secure encrypted communication link through more efficient use of existing frequency bands and significantly reduced likelihood of signal interception, as well as concurrent operation of multiple Switchblade systems in the same vicinity without signal conflict, gives opportunity to extend operational ranges using another DDL arbiter such as a different AeroVironment UAV, and facilitates sensor to shooter operations through automatic communication of mission plans from one AeroVironment UAS to a Switchblade.

The Multi-Pack Launcher (MPL) remotely launches multiple Switchblades. The MPL is fully loaded in a standard 6-pack configuration weighing 160 lb (73 kg). The design is scalable from 2 to 20 rounds and enables rapid reloading of less than 30 seconds per round. The U.S. Army began deploying the MPL in early 2019 for base defense.

==== Block 20 ====
Block 20 increases flight time to 20 minutes. It features an improved DDL range. It has an EO/IR panning camera suite to provide real-time video and left-hand commit with continuous identification (PID).

It has a gross weight of about 8 lb (3.6 kg). The 4-lb (2-kg) unit can be launched in less than two minutes. The launch tube includes an integrated control and can support land, sea, and mobile platforms.

It can send back intelligence, such as GPS coordinates of targets.

=== Switchblade 600 ===
External images
- Photos of internal curcuits of the Switchblade 600

The larger Switchblade 600 loitering munition weighs 54.5 kg (120 lb) including the all-up round in the tube and FCS; the airframe weighs 22.7 kg (50 lb), with the fire control system consisting of a tablet and long-range antenna. The system is man-portable and can be set up in 10 minutes. It is designed to fly out to 40 km (25 mi) in 20 minutes, then loiter for another 20 minutes (giving it an 80 km (50 mi) total range), however, reaching its maximum capable range requires using two long-range antennas deployed on the field to relay command from one operator to another through the handoff capability of the data link. It attacks at a 115 mph (185 km/h) dash speed, carrying a warhead based on the one used on the Javelin ATGM, designed to neutralize armoured vehicles.

A touchscreen tablet-based fire control system can manually or autonomously control the munition. It is secured through onboard encrypted data links and Selective Availability Anti-Spoofing Module GPS with a patented wave-off capability. An optional pocket digital data link (DDL) module allows engagements beyond 90 km (56 mi). The larger Switchblade could be fitted with an anti-tank warhead while having a longer range and costing less than anti-tank missiles like the FGM-148 Javelin.

The Switchblade 600 was developed for the Army Single Multi-Mission Attack Missile development program. Other methods could include a six-pack vehicle-mounted version and by air-launch.

In October 2022, AeroVironment said it was capable of producing more than 2,000 Switchblade 600 systems annually, and that it planned within a few months to increase production capacity to 6,000 per year.

=== Blackwing ===
First demonstrated in 2015, the AeroVironment Blackwing is an unarmed variant of the Switchblade 300 with similar weight and dimensions. It was developed for the United States Navy to provide rapid ISR (Intelligence, surveillance, and reconnaissance) as well as command and control relay operations among surface and undersea manned and unmanned vessels. The Blackwing can be deployed from a submerged submarine, surface ship, or mobile ground launcher.

== Operators ==
=== Current operators ===
United Kingdom

- British Armed Forces

Lithuania

- Lithuanian Armed Forces: In December 2022, Lithuania signed a contract to acquire Switchblade 600 loitering munitions. Lithuania will also receive Switchblade 300 loitering munitions as a donation. Lithuanian forces will receive the kit in 2024. In 2025 Lithuania started operating the equipment.

United States

- U.S. Armed Forces

Ukraine

- Ukrainian Armed Forces

New Zealand

- New Zealand Defence Force

=== Future operators ===
Australia

- Australian Defence Force: In July 2024, Australia announced its intention to purchase an unnumbered quantity of Switchblade drones.

Canada

- Canadian Armed Forces: In Feb. 2025, a $67 million CAD contract awarded for an unknown quantity of Switchblade 300 and 600 loitering munitions systems to be deployed in Latvia.

France

- French Armed Forces: In April 2023, AeroVironment announced a contract with the French Ministry of the Armed Forces, without specifying the number of Switchblade 300 ordered.

Greece

- Hellenic Armed Forces: In September 2024, it was reported that Greece would buy an unknown number of Switchblade 300 and 600 loitering munitions. The cost of the programme is reported to be $75.2 million, with FMF covering $50.2 million.

Romania

- Romanian Armed Forces: In July 2024, it was announced that Romania will procure 25 SwitchBlade 300 systems valued at 176 million lei, as well as an unknown number of SwitchBlade 600 systems. On 26 September 2024, AeroVironment was awarded the contract for the Switchblade systems, part of the 2024 Foreign Military Sales to Lithuania, Romania and Sweden, with an estimated completion date of 30 June 2026.

Sweden

- Swedish Armed Forces: On 26 September 2024, AeroVironment was awarded a contract by the US Department of Defense for the manufacture of Switchblade systems as part of the 2024 Foreign Military Sales to Lithuania, Romania and Sweden.

Taiwan

- Republic of China Armed Forces: In July 2024, the US DoS announced a possible sale of Switchblade 300 loitering munitions for the Taiwanese Armed Forces with an estimated cost of $60.2 million.

== See also ==
- Raytheon Coyote – (United States)
- Phoenix Ghost – (United States), a similar drone
- UVision HERO-30 – (Israel)
- Pike – (United States)
- ZALA Lancet – (Russia)
- WB Electronics Warmate – (Poland)
