= Deflected slipstream =

Deflected slipstream is an approach to creating an aircraft that can take off and land vertically (VTOL), or at least with a very short runway (STOL). The basic principle is to deflect the slipstream from one or more propellers approximately 90 degrees, to create an upward thrust for vertical takeoff and a downward air cushion for landing. Once airborne, the flaps are retracted so the airplane can fly horizontally.

== History ==
=== Preliminary ===
The beginning of this approach to vertical flight was the wing flaps developed during the period of World War I and afterwards. These flaps were designed to add lift to the plane.

=== Research sponsored by NACA in the United States ===
In the period after World War II, when the U.S. National Advisory Committee on Aeronautics (NACA) sponsored research on a fairly large number of approaches to vertical flight, the deflected slipstream approach was investigated through models, wind tunnel tests and construction of full scale aircraft. It was one of a number of S/VTOL technologies that NACA sponsored in the 1950s, which have been summarized by Mike Hirschberg in his “Wheel of Misfortune" chart.

== Wind tunnel explorations ==
In 1956 Robert Kirby explored the effectiveness of wings with large-chord flaps in deflecting propeller slipstream downward through the large angles needed for vertical takeoff.

The tests were carried out at the NACA Langley in Virginia on a model situated in the free-flight wind tunnel facility. The span of the model's wings was approximately equal to the theoretical diameter of the propeller slipstream, i.e. 70% of the propeller diameter (24 inches [61 cm]). Robert Kirby summarized his research on deflected slipstream in NACA Technical Note [TN] 3800:

“The investigation showed that it was possible to turn the propeller slipstream 90° so that the resultant-force vector of the wing-propeller combination was normal to the propeller shaft and was 80 percent of the magnitude of the propeller thrust. When the model was near the ground, the slipstream was turned only about 75°, but the resultant force increased to about 88 percent of the thrust. The resultant force was reduced about 10 percent when a fuselage was added to the wing system.” He added in his conclusion, “End plates with an approximately semicircular shape on each wing (defined by the upper surface of the wing with the flaps deflected and a tie between the leading and trailing edge) were essential for obtaining high turning angles and efficiency. Larger end plates showed no improvement in the turning effectiveness of the wing system”.

Schematic of deflected slipstream principle

Other wind tunnel studies of deflected slipstream VTOL mechanics were conducted in 1955 and 1956 by Richard Kuhn and John Draper at the NACA Langley Research Center. They published a number of Technical Notes on the subject for NACA. In Technical Note 3360, Kuhn and Draper discussed their goal:

An investigation of the effectiveness of monoplane wings and flaps in deflecting propeller slipstreams downward is being conducted at the Langley Aeronautical Laboratory. A part of this investigation is reported in references 1 and 2. The results of reference 1 indicate that a monoplane wing equipped with plain flaps and auxiliary vanes can deflect the slipstream through the large angles approaching the angles required for vertical take-off.

Kuhn and Draper concluded from their research:

On the basis of tests with flat plates of various chords, the best turning angle was obtained with a ratio of wing chord to propeller diameter equal to 1.00, which was the largest ratio investigated; however, increasing the ratio of wing chord to propeller diameter from 0.75 to 1.00 led to only a small improvement in turning effectiveness but caused a large increase in the diving moment.

This reference to a "diving moment", meaning pitching forward of the model as it approached the ground while hovering indicated one of the challenges facing the construction of full-scale prototypes that used the deflected slipstream principle.

== Prototypes ==
Three different craft were built in the late 1950s and early 1960s that utilized deflected slipstream as the means of achieving vertical or short takeoffs.

=== The Ryan Model 92 Vertiplane VZ-3RY ===
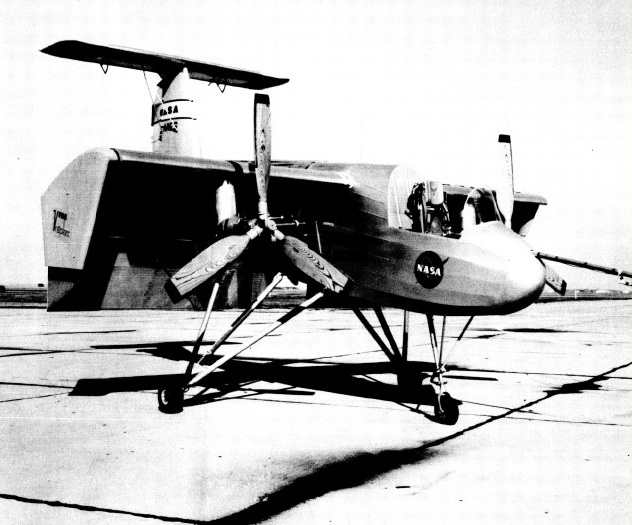
Deflected slipstream prototype VZ-3RY on runway, flaps down

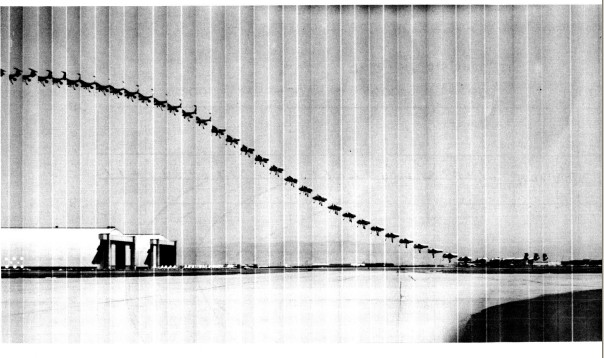
VZ-3RY with STOL takeoff

The Ryan VZ-3 was a deflected-slipstream aircraft intended for total VTOL capability. The VZ-3RY project started in 1957 when Ryan Aeronautical Company was contracted by the U.S. Army to develop and build a flying craft with V/STOL capability.

The airplane had a short wingspan with large-chord double-slotted flaps, powered by a 825 horsepower (615 kW) shaft turbine. The engine drove the opposite rotating twin wooden propellers. Each prop was 9 feet 2 inches (2.79 m) diameter.

Results of the testing of this craft were first published November 1959 in the NASA TN D-89 of the Ames Research Center at Moffett Field, California. In Figure 12 above, the airplane is mounted with the trailing edge of the flaps at an altitude of 17 feet (out of ground effect). To quote the authors of TN D-89,

“The major objectives of the wind-tunnel study were to determine if the machine could achieve steady-state VTOL operation; to determine under what conditions operation would become impossible or unsafe from either an aerodynamic or structural limit; and to obtain the information necessary for the piloted motion simulation of the aircraft…. The major portion of the tests was directed toward conditions and forces simulating level unaccelerated flight, that is, lift about equal to the airplane weight (2625 lb) and drag about equal to the horizontal thrust component.”

They found that a diving moment materialized as the aircraft in hover mode approaches the ground from 16 feet (4.9 m) or less, even if the flaps are not fully employed. When those flaps are deployed, the diving moment becomes even more serious:

“The primary effect of approaching the ground during hovering was a pitch-down moment beyond the trimming capabilities of the longitudinal control. This moment was brought under control by the addition of a leading-edge slat.”

But, the addition of this slat also created pitch instability when forward flight was attempted.

In a later technical note, in 1963, designated NASA TN-D-1891, authors Howard L. Turner and Fred J. Drinkwater III concluded:

“The Ryan VZ-3RY test vehicle was flight tested over the airspeed range from 80 knots to below 6 knots. The deflected slipstream concept proved to be better suited to STOL than VTOL operation. Adverse ground effects prevented operation close to the ground at speeds less than 20 knots and below approximately 15 feet in altitude. Steep glide slopes to landing (up to –16°) at approximately 40 knots were achieved, but steep, slow, descending flight did not appear feasible. Full-span leading-edge slats markedly increased the descent capability and reduced the minimum level flight speed.”

The inability to descend in true vertical fashion and unresolved issues as the craft approach the ground, known as “adverse ground effect”, seemed to eliminate consideration of this craft as a VTOL contender. As they investigated the vehicle's behavior as it approached the ground, and became subject to the “ground effect”, they found:

“The mechanism of the ground effect appears to be that the deflected slipstream is recirculated through the propeller disc as turbulent air, producing in part, a loss in propeller efficiency, hence, a loss in slipstream velocity and a reduction in turning effectiveness. A loss in lift results from the lowered slipstream velocity and the aircraft sinks rapidly into the ground. It was not possible to check the descent with application of power. A loud slapping noise from the propellers accompanies this loss in lift. The aircraft did not exhibit any tendency to pitch abruptly when entering into ground effect. However, under cross-wind conditions, asymmetric losses in lift were experienced, resulting in abrupt sideslip or abrupt banking of the aircraft just prior to ground contact.”

The VZ-3RY did exhibit strong STOL features, as can be seen in the photo above, where the airplane takes off in a very short distance. But, there were a number of obstacles to true vertical (or VTOL) flight, and research on the craft did not continue to see if these obstacles could be overcome. The last word on this craft remained:

“Flight tests with the Ryan VZ-3RY V/STOL deflected-slipstream test vehicle have indicated that the concept has some outstanding advantages as a STOL aircraft where very short take-off and landing characteristics are desired. An adverse ground effect, brought about by the recirculation of the propeller slipstream, severely restricted operation at very low airspeeds.”

=== The Fairchild M-224-1 VZ-5FA ===
Fairchild Aircraft, which had been building aircraft since the 1920s was contracted by the US Army in the late 1950s build the Fairchild VZ-5 another airplane attempting vertical flight with the deflected slipstream principle. NASA Technical Memorandum, TM SX-805, authored by Marvin P. Fink describes the results of the testing of this deflected slipstream aircraft at the Langley wind tunnel.

The summary of the investigation said the testing results for the VZ-5 were not favorable:

The investigation showed that the airplane was unstable over the speed range and could not be trimmed about the actual center of gravity at 0.64 chord for the low speed. In order to provide a reasonable degree of longitudinal stability for the basic airplane configuration and a bare capability of trim over the flap deflection range, it would be necessary to ballast the airplane to move the center of gravity far ahead of its actual location. About 700 pounds of weight added to the cockpit area would be necessary to move the center of gravity the required amount. The airplane can develop a hovering lift of about 4,000 pounds which is approximately equal to its weight. The airplane had very high effective dihedral which, coupled with the certain directional instabilities, would be expected to produce highly undesirable flying qualities.”

Since the VZ-5 was only ground and wind tunnel tested, exactly how those “undesirable flying qualities” would have become manifest in test fights never became known.

=== The Robertson VTOL ===
A third attempt to utilize deflected slipstream to give an airplane VTOL capabilities was built by the Robertson Aircraft Corporation in 1956 and 1957. It was never flown off tether.

== Production aircraft ==
While no aircraft utilizing deflected slipstream technology ever entered production as a VTOL vehicle, this technology has been used to allow short take off and landing (STOL) airplanes. One noted example was the Breguet 941, which did see limited service in production mode.

== Current efforts ==
Features of the Bertelsens' design, such as the arc wing, and the flaps to deflect the propeller slipstream can be seen in this drawing.

The three craft presented above represent NASA's efforts to employ the deflected slipstream approach to vertical and short take off take offs and landings (V/STOL). Since only the Ryan VZ-3RY left the ground and it did not perform well in purely vertical operations, no true VTOL craft based on the deflected slipstream was developed during the period of NACA and NASA research in the 1950s and 1960s.

One researcher, operating on his own resources continued to look at this approach to a VTOL airplane, and spent over five decades of his time in a quest for a deflected slipstream airplane with vertical capabilities. In those years, he proposed a radically different wing shape – which he calls the arc wing – and has performed his own tests, augmented by university wind tunnel tests, to determine the viability of his approach.

This researcher, Dr. William Bertelsen, died in 2009. His son William D. Bertelsen, continues to experiment with the deflected slipstream method of vertical flight, and has built small models, kites, parasails and ultra lights as part of his research. To date (2017), a full-scale model of the design, shown here, has not been built.

== See also ==
- Blown flap
- Custer Channel Wing
