= NCSIST Cardinal =

Family of Taiwanese UAVs

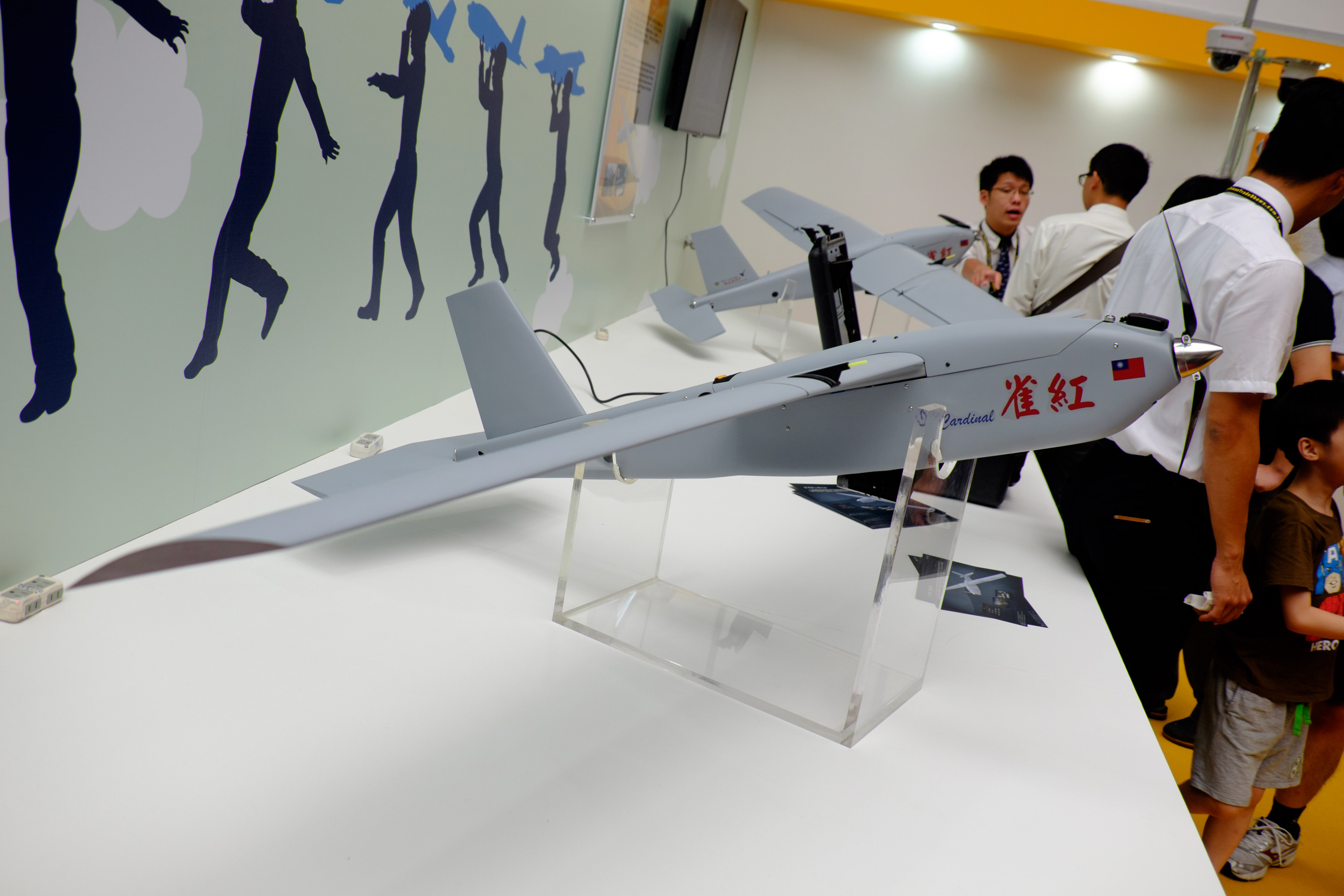
- NCSIST Cardinal II UAV
- Type: UAV
- Place of origin: Taiwan

Production history
- Designer: National Chung-Shan Institute of Science and Technology

The NCSIST Cardinal UAV (Chinese: 紅雀微型無人機) is a family of small unmanned aerial vehicles made by the National Chung-Shan Institute of Science and Technology (NCSIST).

== Variants ==
=== Cardinal I ===
The Cardinal I was the initial prototype of the Cardinal.

=== Cardinal II ===
The Cardinal II began development in 2009 and is based on the Cardinal I but has a better payload design, digital data link, and automatic tracking antenna system. It was exhibited at the 2015 Paris Air Show. In service with Republic of China Marine Corps and Republic of China Army. Other than military missions the Cardinal II can be used for civil remote sensing and disaster relief missions.

The Taiwanese Navy procured 54 aircraft in 2016.

The components of a Cardinal II system are the aircraft, an antenna, and a ground control box. The Cardinal II is hand launched and recovered by parachute. The aircraft is equipped with an autopilot and can transmit data and imagery in real time. The remote control flight range is 8km. In service a Taiwanese Cardinal II unit has six primary aircraft and three backups.

=== Cardinal III ===
Cardinal III features vertical takeoff and landing capabilities. It is reportedly optimized for coastal surveillance. It is intended for operation by the Marine Corps. It was displayed at the Taipei Aerospace & Defense Technology Exhibition in 2023.

=== Fire Cardinal ===
In 2019 NCSIST exhibited the Fire Cardinal for the first time at the Taipei Aerospace & Defense Technology Exhibition. It was referred to by NCSIST as an "air-to-ground assault" UAV, what is more commonly known as a loitering munition. The Fire Cardinal is a twin-propeller drone about four feet long with a six-foot wingspan. It weighs around 15 pounds and includes an electro-optical and infrared sensor as well as advanced target discrimination systems.

== Specifications (Cardinal II) ==
General characteristics

- Length: 1.9 m (6 ft 3 in)
- Wingspan: 1.3 m (4 ft 3 in)
- Gross weight: 5.5 kg (12 lb)

Performance

- Maximum speed: 55 km/h (34 mph, 30 kn)
- Range: 50 km (31 mi, 27 nmi)

== See also ==
- NCSIST Chien Hsiang
- AeroVironment RQ-20 Puma
- Defense industry of Taiwan
