= Ryan VZ-3 Vertiplane =

Experimental Aircraft

VZ-3 Vertiplane
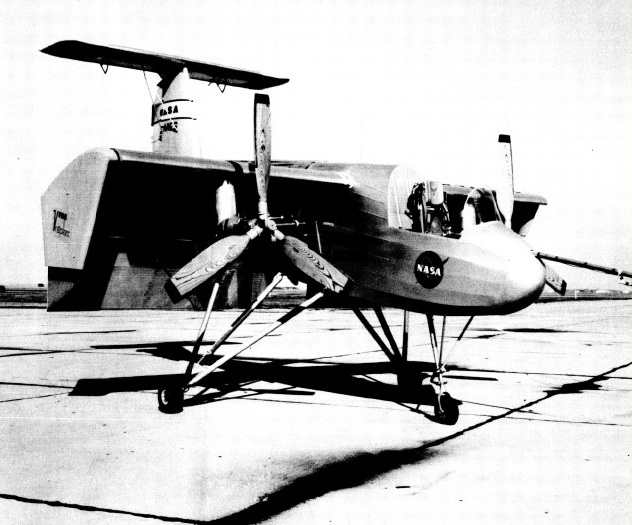

General information
- Type: Experimental VTOL aircraft
- Manufacturer: Ryan
- Primary users: United States Army NASA
- Number built: 1

History
- First flight: December 29, 1958

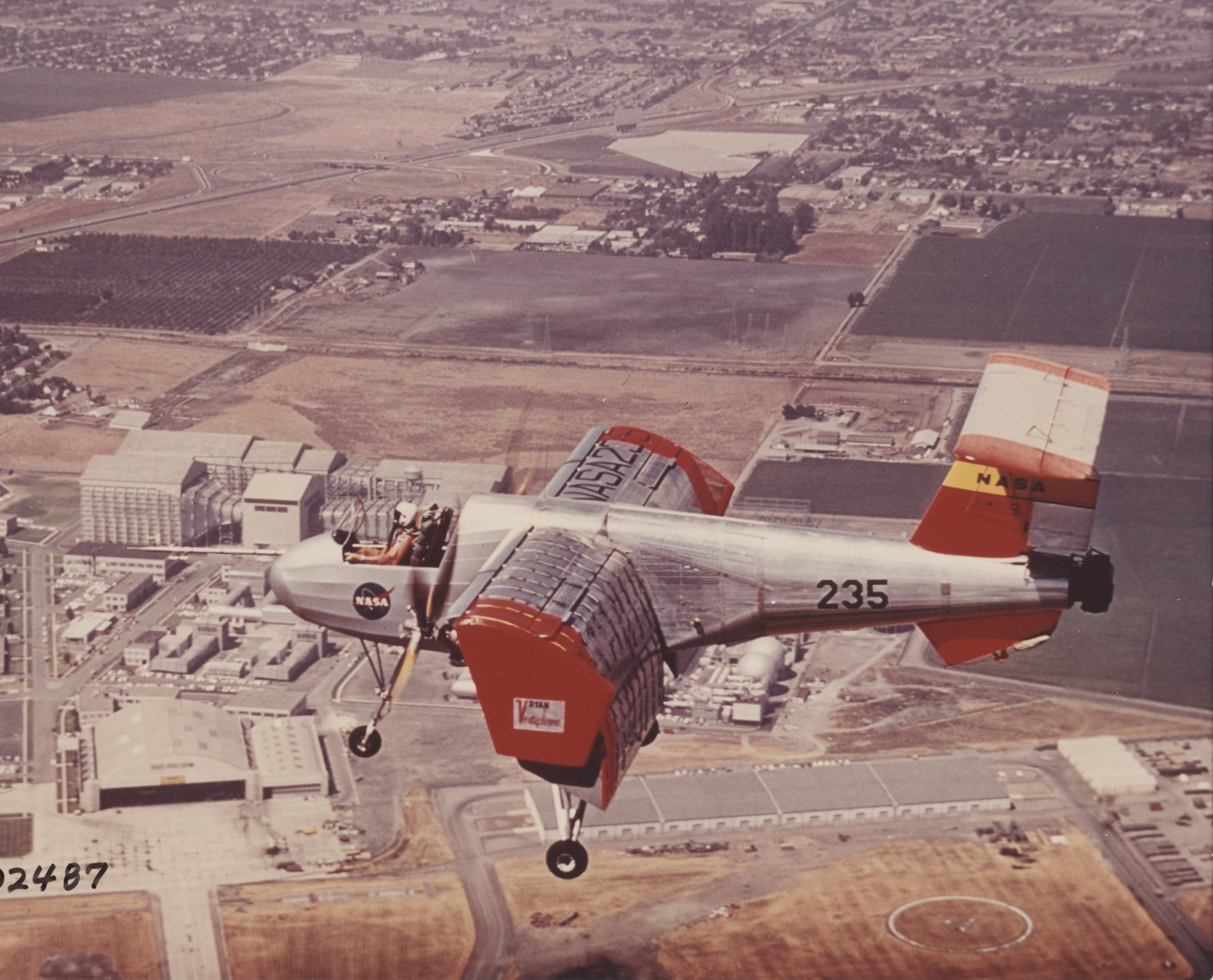
Ryan VZ-3RY Vertiplane in flight over the NASA Ames Research Center.

The Ryan VZ-3 Vertiplane, also known by the company designation Ryan Model 92 was an American experimental vertical/short take-off (VSTOL) aircraft built by the Ryan Aeronautical Company for the United States Army.

== Design and development ==
The VZ-3 was a simple proof-of-concept experimental aircraft using blown flaps to achieve a short or near vertical take-off. It was a high-wing monoplane powered by an Avco Lycoming T53 turboshaft engine located inside the fuselage driving two large-diameter propellers mounted, one on each wing. It had a T-tail and originally a tailwheel fixed landing gear. It had wide-span double retractable trailing-edge flaps, these were extended into the propeller slipstream for takeoff. To enable control while in the hover it had a universally-jointed jet-deflection nozzle at the rear of the aircraft. It was later modified with a nose-wheel landing gear.

The VZ-3 could make a near-vertical takeoff within 30 ft (9m) at a speed of 25 mph (40 km/h) and the aircraft could be put into the hover up to a height of 3,700 ft (1,100 m).

== Operational history ==
The aircraft conducted a 21-flight test program for the United States Army until it crashed in 1959. It was rebuilt with an open cockpit lengthened fuselage and handed over to NASA for further trials. Following retirement the VZ-3 is on display at the United States Army Aviation Museum.

== Operator ==
United States

- United States Army
- NASA

== Specifications ==
Data from Jane's 1976.

General characteristics

- Crew: One
- Length: 27 ft 8 in (8.43 m)
- Wingspan: 23 ft 5 in (7.14 m)
- Height: 10 ft 8 in (3.25 m)
- Gross weight: 2,600 lb (1,179 kg)
- Powerplant: 1 × Avco Lycoming T53-L-1 turboshaft, 1,000 shp (750 kW)

== See also ==
- Deflected slipstream

Aircraft of comparable role, configuration, and era

- Fairchild VZ-5
- Dornier Do 29

Related lists

- List of experimental aircraft
