= NCSIST Chien Hsiang =

Taiwanese loitering munition

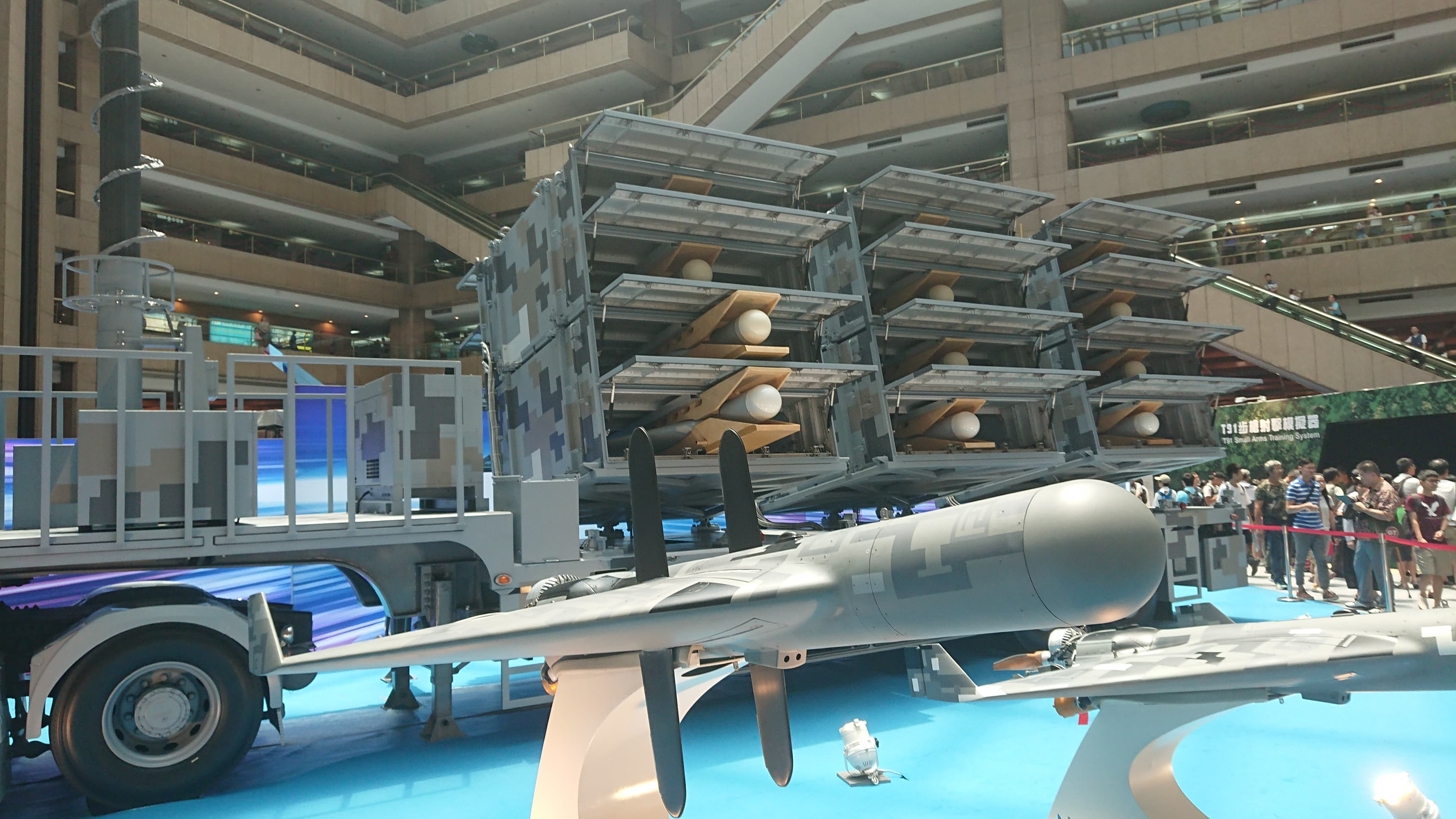
- Launcher of Chien hsiang loitering munition
- Type: Loitering munition
- Place of origin: Taiwan

Service history
- Used by: Republic of China Air Force

Production history
- Manufacturer: National Chung-Shan Institute of Science and Technology

Specifications
- Length: 1,200 mm (47 in)
- Width: 2,000 mm (79 in)
- Wingspan: 2,000 mm (79 in)
- Propellant: Liquid fuel
- Operational range: 1000 km
- Maximum speed: 185 km/h (115 mph)
- Guidance system: EO, inertial, and anti-radiation homing
- Launch platform: Box launcher
- Transport: Tractor trailer

The NCSIST Chien Hsiang (Chinese: 劍翔無人機; Pe̍h-ōe-jī: Kiàm-siông; lit. 'Rising Sword') is a Taiwanese anti-radiation loitering munition developed and produced by the National Chung-Shan Institute of Science and Technology (NCSIST).

== Overview ==
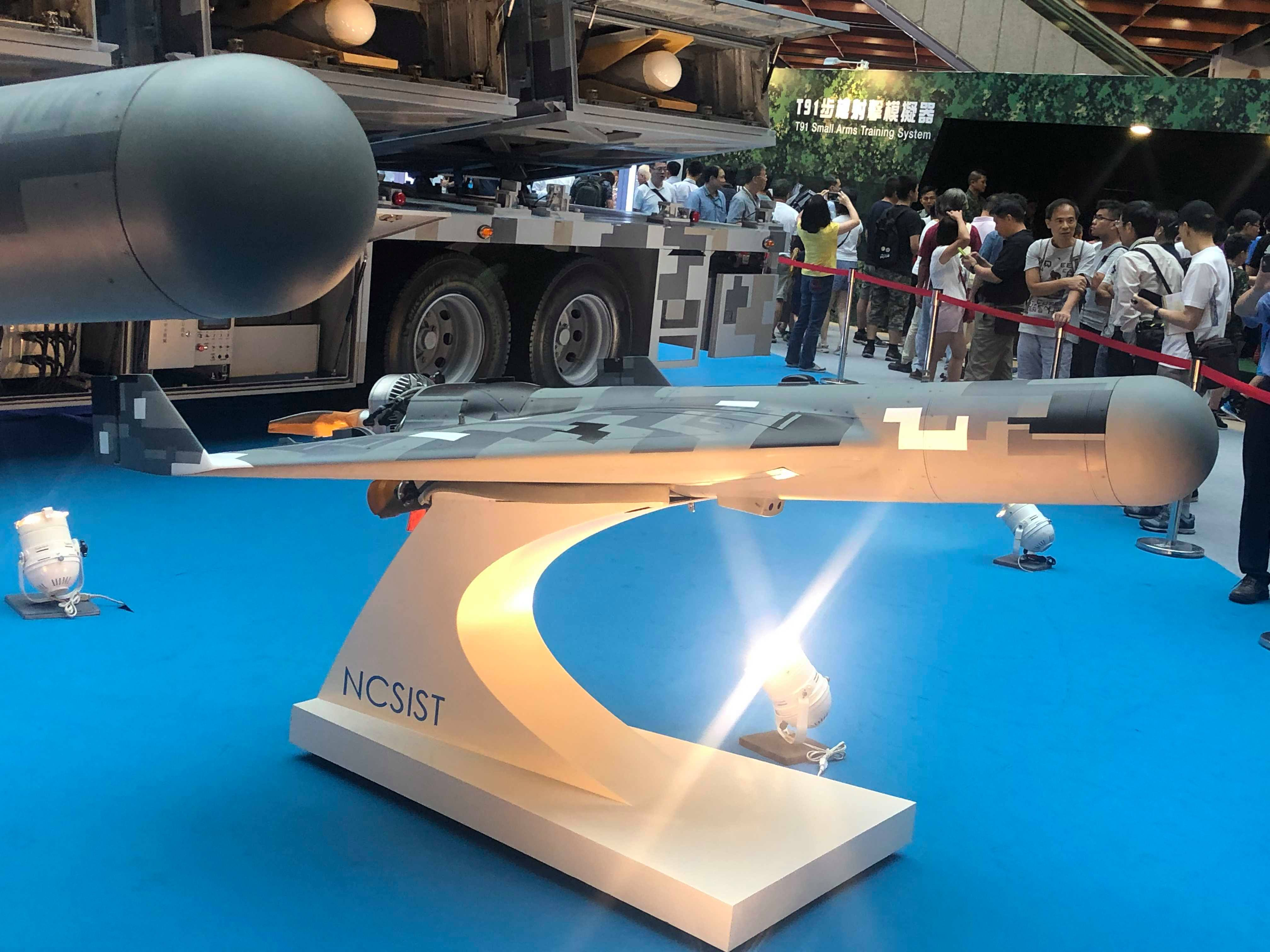
Chien Hsiang loitering munition

The Chien Hsiang is 1.2 meters long and has a wingspan of 2 meters. It has a delta wing and a pusher propeller. The Chien Hsiang has a reported loiter time of 100 hours and a top speed of 185 km/h. They are primarily intended to fill the anti-radiation weapon role targeting enemy radars, transmitters, and associated systems.

While the Chien Hsiang is comparable to the Israeli IAI Harpy, NCSIST has said that any resemblance is coincidental and that the platform is entirely indigenous.

A variant with a sensor ball mounted under its nose has been displayed.

== History ==
The Chien Hsiang was first exhibited in 2017 at the Taipei Aerospace & Defense Technology Exhibition. In 2019, the Taiwan Air Force’s Air Defense and Missile Command announced a five year, NT$80b (US$2.54b) project to build up a full force of anti-radiation UAVs.

In 2022, it was reported that Chien Hsiang production was ahead of schedule and initial procurement was expected to be completed by 2024 or 2025.

== Launcher ==
The main Chien Hsiang launch platform is a trailer mounting twelve box launchers. It can also be launched from fixed positions and naval vessels.

== Variants ==
=== Decoy ===
Designed to confuse air defenses systems in conjunction with strike Chien Hsiangs.

=== Anti-ship ===
Two Chien Hsiang derivatives with larger warheads were displayed in 2023.

== See also ==
- NCSIST Fire Cardinal
- Defense industry of Taiwan
