= Dornier Do 29 =

Experimental aircraft

Do 29
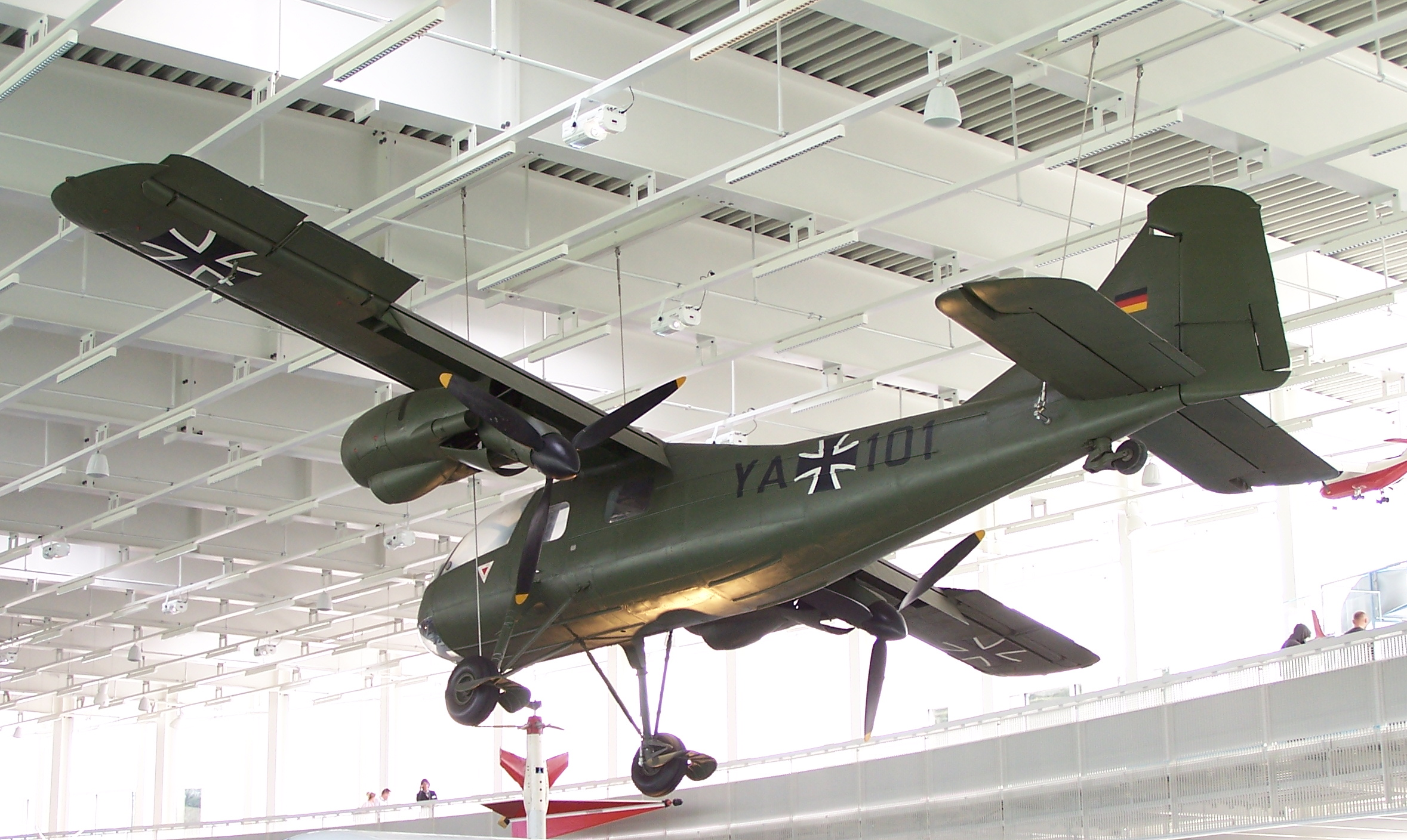
- Do 29 on display at the Dornier Museum

General information
- Type: Experimental aircraft
- National origin: Germany
- Manufacturer: Dornier Flugzeugwerke
- Primary user: DFL

History
- Manufactured: 2
- First flight: 12 December 1958
- Developed from: Dornier Do 27

The Dornier Do 29 was an experimental aircraft developed by Dornier Flugzeugwerke and, the Deutsche Versuchsanstalt für Luftfahrt (German Aviation Laboratory) in the 1950s, used to test a tilting-propeller system for Vertical/Short Take-Off and Landing (V/STOL) aircraft. The concept was proved successful in flight testing; however, no further development of the system or aircraft was proceeded with, and at the conclusion of its test program the Do 29 was retired.

== Design and development ==
During the Second World War, Heinrich Focke of Focke-Achgelis, a manufacturer of helicopters, developed a design for a short takeoff and landing aircraft that would utilise a system of pusher propellers, one on each wing in a pusher configuration, to provide downward thrust and enhance lift. Designated Fa 269, the design was not developed due to the state of the war.

In the 1950s, however, a renewed interest in STOL and VTOL aircraft led to a re-evaluation of Focke's concept. Dornier was given a contract to develop an aircraft capable of demonstrating the tilting-propeller system. The aircraft, given the designation Do 29, was based on the Do 27 light transport, modified with twin Lycoming GO-480 engines mounted below the wings. These engines drove three-bladed, pusher propellers, that were capable of being tilted downwards to an angle of up to 90 degrees, and the engines were coupled so that symmetrical thrust could be maintained in the event of an engine failure.

The forward fuselage was also modified with a helicopter-like cockpit. A Martin-Baker ejection seat was provided for pilot escape in the event of an emergency. The previous Dornier Do 27 had capacity for 4 or 5 passengers, while the Do 29 was expected to have similar passenger numbers at 4 to 6 passengers.

== Testing ==
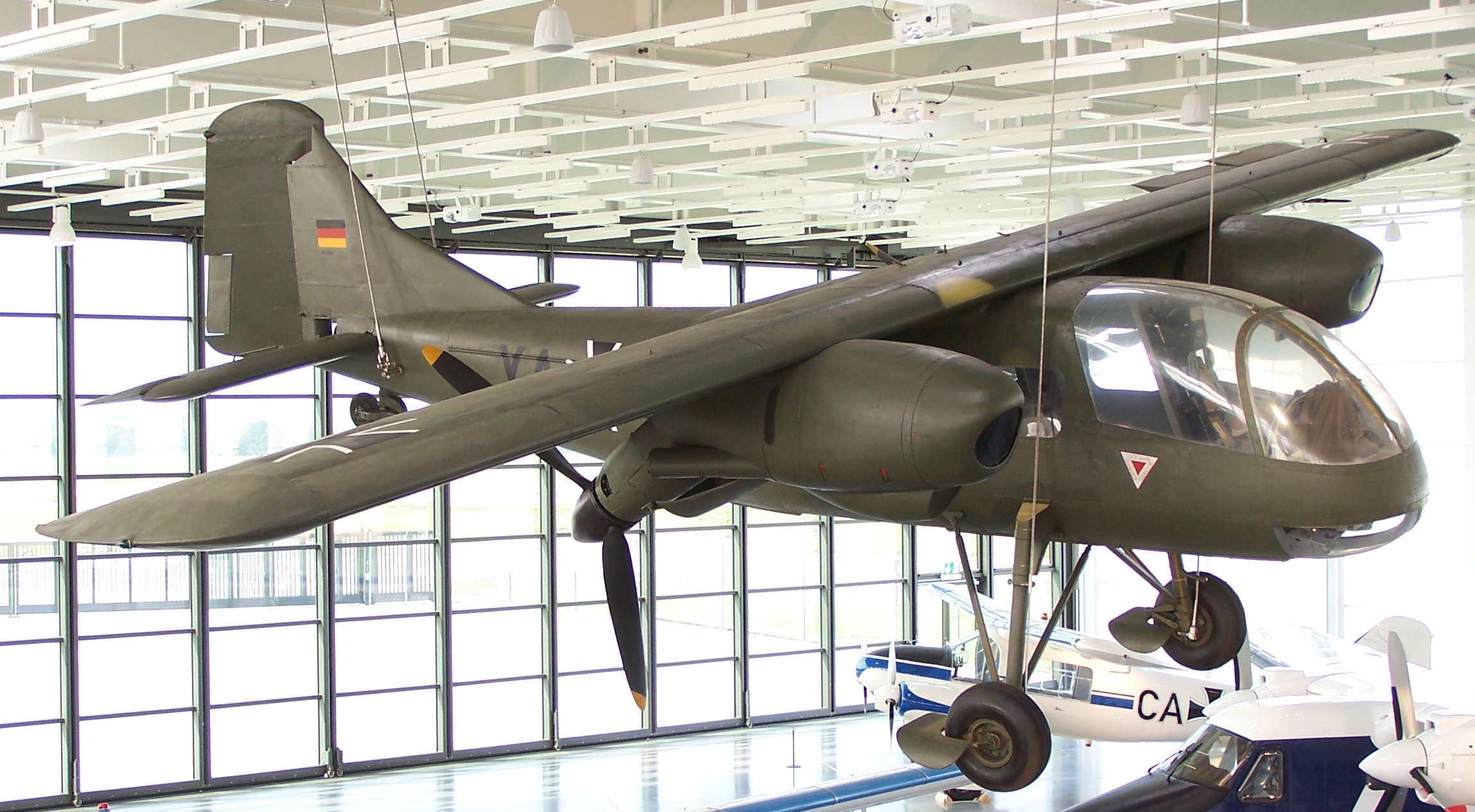
The Do 29 at the Dornier Museum

Two examples of the Do 29 were constructed, while a third was planned but not built, with the first prototype flying on 12 December 1958. In the following flight testing, the propeller system was not rotated further than 60 degrees as opposed to its nominal 90 degree capability, but the aircraft proved to be highly successful, with a stalling speed of 24 kilometres per hour (15 mph) and exceptional short-field performance. The aircraft did have some issues during testing, as in July 1962, 1 of the 2 Do 29's was damaged and was written off. The 2nd remaining aircraft continued testing for another year before it was retired. The aircraft was expected to have an 82-foot takeoff run, but some sources state it had a 262-foot takeoff run and 147 foot run for landing.

Following testing, the Do-29's the tilting-propeller system was not further pursued after the end of the flight test program.

== Aircraft on display ==
One of the Do 29 prototypes survived the program, and is displayed in the Dornier Museum in Friedrichshafen, Germany.

== Operators ==
Germany

- Luftwaffe

== Specifications (Do 29) ==
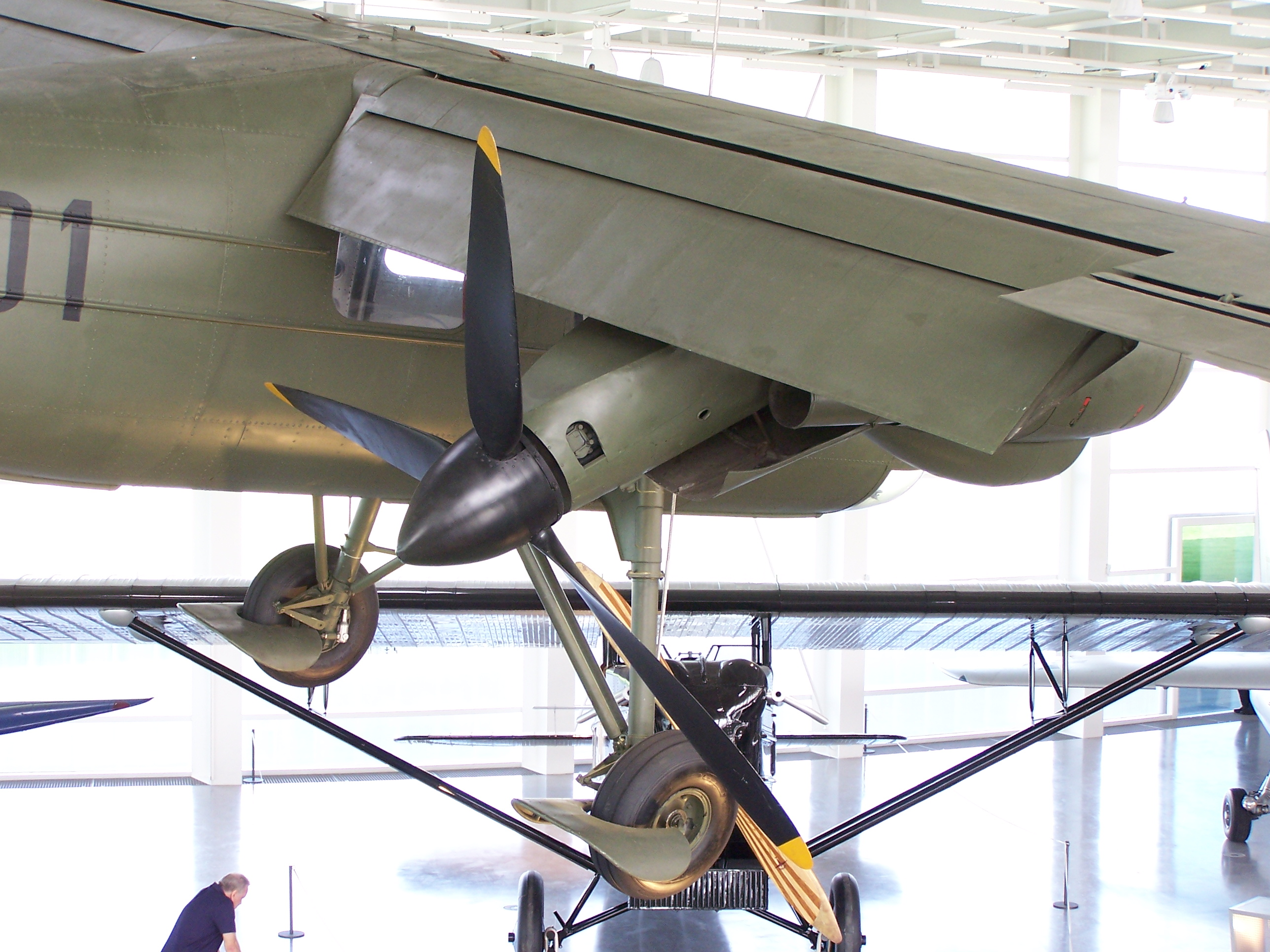
Detail of propeller assembly

Data from

General characteristics

- Crew: one (pilot)
- Length: 9.5 m (31 ft 2 in)
- Wingspan: 13.2 m (43 ft 4 in)
- Height: 2.69 m (8 ft 10 in)
- Wing area: 21.8 m^{2} (235 sq ft)
- Empty weight: 2,180 kg (4,806 lb)
- Gross weight: 2,400 kg (5,291 lb)
- Max takeoff weight: 2,490 kg (5,490 lb)
- Powerplant: 2 × Lycoming GO-480-B1A6 geared horizontally-opposed piston engines, 200 kW (270 hp) each
- Propellers: 3-bladed

Performance

- Maximum speed: 290 km/h (180 mph, 160 kn)
- Minimum control speed: 24 km/h (15 mph, 13 kn)
- Range: 400 km (250 mi, 220 nmi)
- Service ceiling: 6,500 m (21,300 ft)

== See also ==
Aircraft of comparable role, configuration, and era

- Vertol VZ-2
- Ryan VZ-3
- Fairchild VZ-5

Related lists

- List of experimental aircraft
- List of military aircraft of Germany
