= Fairchild VZ-5 =

VZ-5
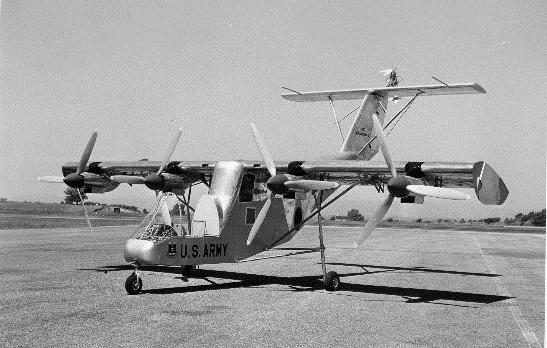
- Photo of VZ-5 parked on runway

General information
- Type: Experimental VTOL aircraft
- National origin: United States
- Manufacturer: Fairchild Aircraft
- Primary user: United States Army
- Number built: 1

History
- First flight: 18 November 1959; 65 years ago
- Retired: 1962

The Fairchild VZ-5 (or Model M-224-1) was an experimental VTOL aircraft built in the 1950s. The VZ-5 was designed by Fairchild Aircraft for research use by the United States Army.

== Development ==
The VZ-5 prototype was built as part of a series of experimental aircraft designed to study various designs for VTOL aircraft and solve problems related to vertical and short takeoff. The VZ-5 was an all-metal high-wing monoplane with a fixed tricycle undercarriage. The fuselage had an open cockpit for one pilot and a rear-mounted high-tailplane. The unusual aspect of the aircraft was that it had one General Electric turboshaft in the rear fuselage driving four propellers, two each mounted in nacelles on the leading edge of each wing. It also had two small four-bladed tail-rotors mounted above the tailplane for control. The wing had conventional trailing edge flaps and ailerons but it also had a section of the wing that could be deflected to act as a full-span flap. For a vertical takeoff two-thirds of the wing chord acted as a flap in the slipstream of the four propellers.

The VZ-5 was first flown tethered on 18 November 1959 but only had limited testing before the project was abandoned.

== Operators ==
United States

- United States Army

== Specifications (VZ-5) ==
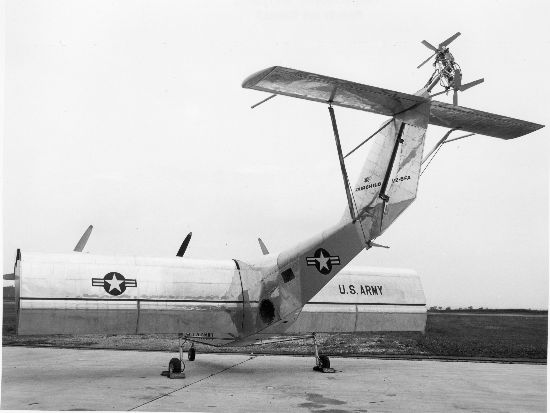
The VZ-5 with fully extended flaps

Data from

General characteristics

- Crew: 1
- Length: 33 ft 8 in (10.26 m)
- Wingspan: 32 ft 9 in (9.98 m)
- Height: 16 ft 10 in (5.13 m)
- Wing area: 191 sq ft (17.7 m^{2})
- Empty weight: 3,382 lb (1,534 kg)
- Gross weight: 3,976 lb (1,803 kg) (for VTOL)
- Powerplant: 1 × General Electric YT58-GE-2 turboshaft engine, 1,032 shp (770 kW)

Performance

- Maximum speed: 184 mph (296 km/h, 160 kn) (estimate)

== See also ==
Aircraft of comparable role, configuration, and era

- Ryan VZ-3 Vertiplane
- Dornier Do 29

Related lists

- List of experimental aircraft
- List of military aircraft of the United States
