= Dornier DAR =

Drone Anti-Radar (DAR)
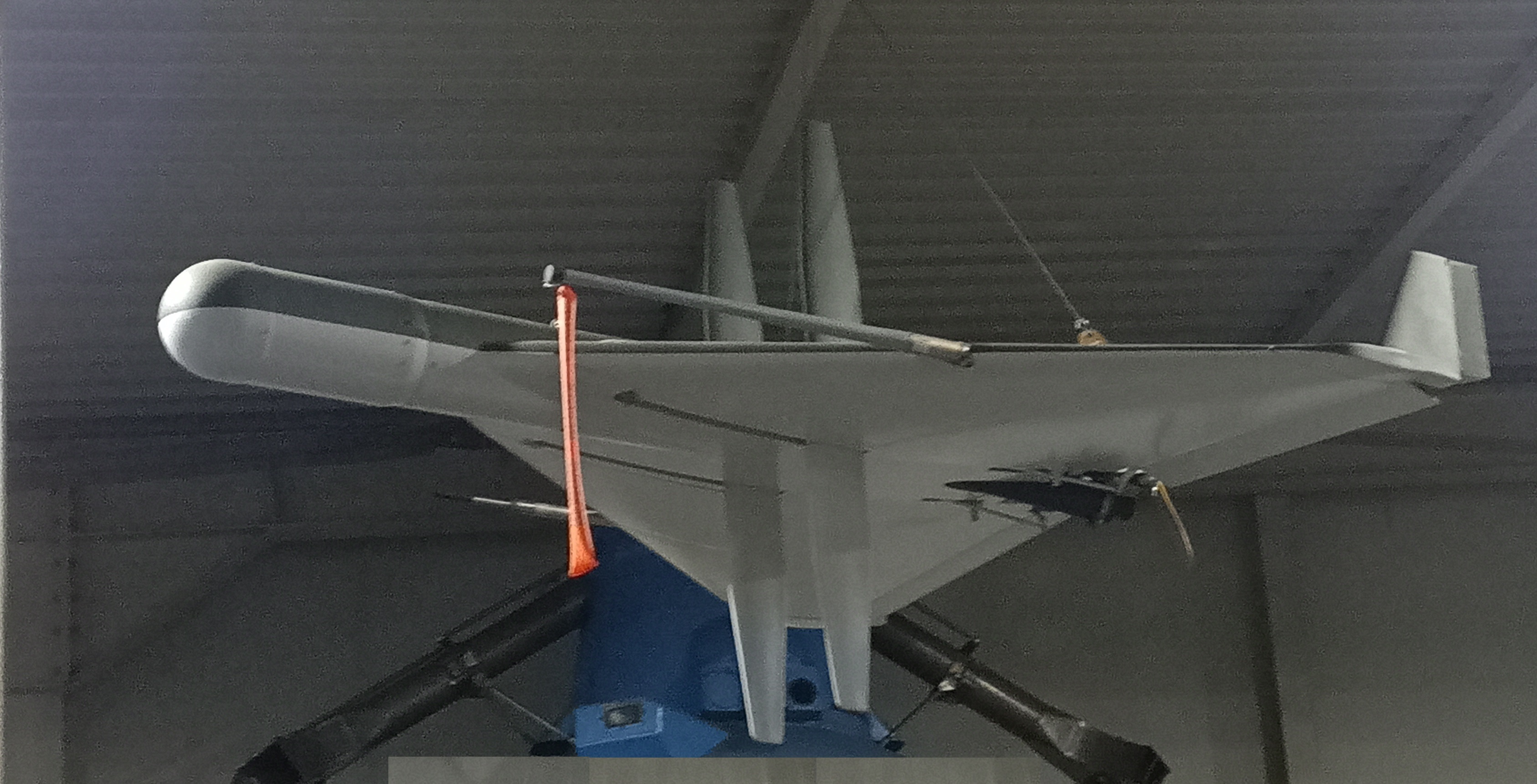
- Drone Anti-Radar at the Wehrtechnische Studiensammlung Koblenz
- Type: Loitering munition
- Place of origin: West Germany

Production history
- Designed: c. 1985
- Manufacturer: Dornier GmbH

Specifications
- Mass: 142.5 kg (314 lb) (Combat weight)
- Length: 2.3 m (7.5 ft)

The Dornier Drohne Anti-Radar (DAR) was an unmanned aerial vehicle developed by Dornier GmbH to detect and destroy enemy radar installations, especially those used for air defense, within a defined target area. The development project was terminated in 1994 and the system never entered service.

== Design and development ==
In the early 1980s, the United States and West Germany began developing an unmanned aerial vehicle (UAV) designed to detect and engage enemy radar systems. The aircraft was also intended to mimic larger aircraft, acting as a decoy to divert enemy fire from manned aircraft. On the German side, Dornier, and later its successor company DASA, was working on the project for the German Air Force. During the project's development, a workable seeker head could not be developed, limiting its suitability for the intended anti-radar mission. This, along with the end of the Cold War and the collapse of the Soviet Union, led to the project's eventual termination. Following the end of the project, details of the system's design were sold to Israel, which would develop its own IAI Harpy.

The DAR is a delta wing aircraft constructed of composite materials. Two deployable rudders are integrated into each wing on either side of the fuselage; these are deployed before the final approach to the target. The fuel tanks are designed as slide-in units. The engine, with its attached generator, is mounted in the rear of the fuselage. It is started while still inside the launch tube. The two-bladed pusher propeller is connected to the engine via a coupling that engages the propeller to the engine only after the UAV has left the launch container. A booster rocket is located beneath the engine, providing the necessary thrust to accelerate the UAV from the launch container to the required flight speed. A fragmentation warhead was to be mounted in the fuselage directly behind the seeker head. For flight control, the computer receives data from a three-axis fiber optic gyroscope array, the air data sensors, the Navstar GPS receiver, and a magnetometer. The passive broadband seeker was intended to cover all potential radar systems in the target catalog. The required target parameters would be loaded before the drone's launch, and the seeker would scan the frequency bands during flight. Once a target was detected, the data acquired by the seeker would be used to guide the drone to the target.

The DAR system's ground components comprised a launch vehicle and a transport and reloading vehicle. These were 6x6 10-ton Iveco 260AH trucks with extended chassis. An initial plan to mount the system on the 6x4 10-ton MAN 260AH military truck, a standard vehicle of the German Armed Forces, was abandoned after initial testing. The launch vehicle chassis housed the ground control station in a Cab II FmB with radio communication, a tipping mechanism for the launch container, a power supply system, and distribution boxes. Up to 18 DARs could be carried in this configuration. The transport and reloading vehicle was equipped with a loading crane.

== Aircraft on display ==
Examples of the DAR are on display at the Wehrtechnische Studiensammlung Koblenz (Scientific Collection of Defense Engineering Specimens) in Koblenz and were previously displayed at the Dornier Museum in Friedrichshafen.

== Specifications ==
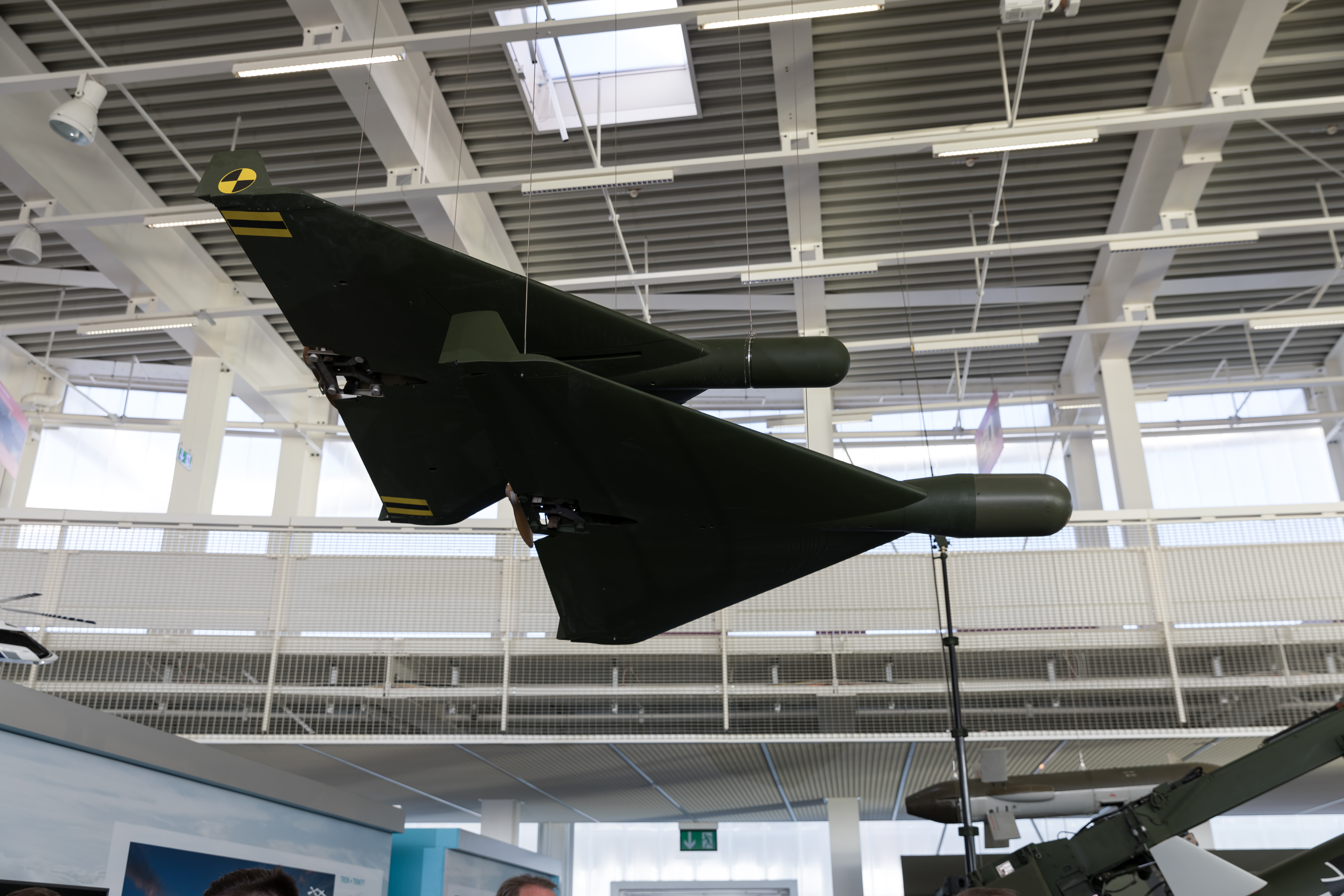
Two DAR on display in the Dornier Museum Friedrichshafen

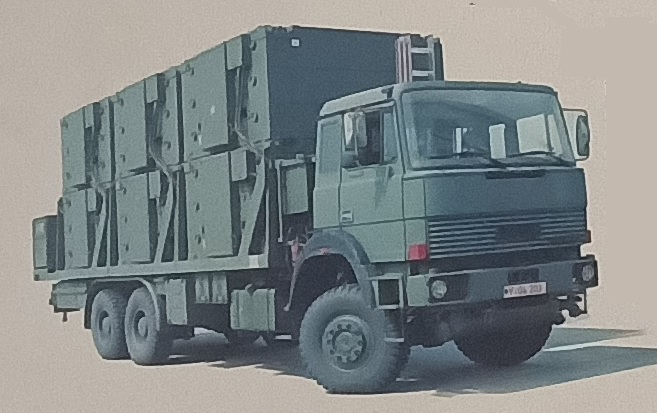
DAR launch vehicle

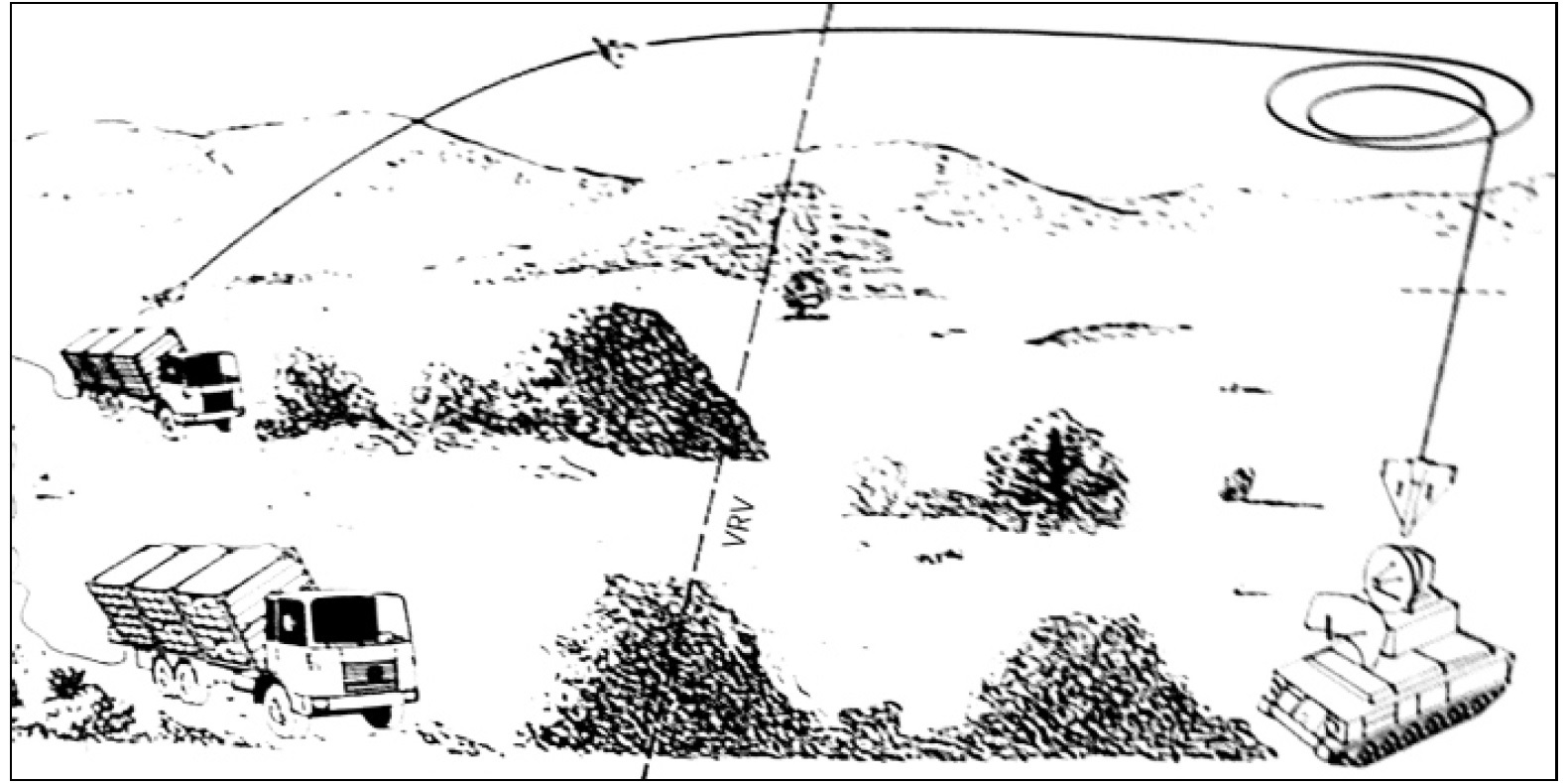
DAR deployment

Data from

General characteristics

- Crew: None
- Length: 2.3 m (7 ft 7 in)
- Wingspan: 2 m (6 ft 7 in)
- Height: 0.36 m (1 ft 2 in)
- Gross weight: 110 kg (243 lb)
- Fuel capacity: 18 kg (40 lb)
- Powerplant: 1 × Fichtel & Sachs SF2-360 two-cylinder, two-stroke boxer engine with two-stage carburetor, 20.5 kW (27.5 hp) at 7000 rpm
- Propellers: 2-bladed, 0.67 m (2 ft 2 in) diameter

Performance

- Maximum speed: 250 km/h (160 mph, 130 kn)
- Endurance: three hours
- Service ceiling: 3,000 m (9,800 ft)
- Rate of climb: 6 m/s (1,200 ft/min)

== See also ==
- LUCAS
- HESA Shahed 136
- IAI Harpy
