= Dornier Museum Friedrichshafen =

Coordinates: 47°40′14″N 9°31′04″E

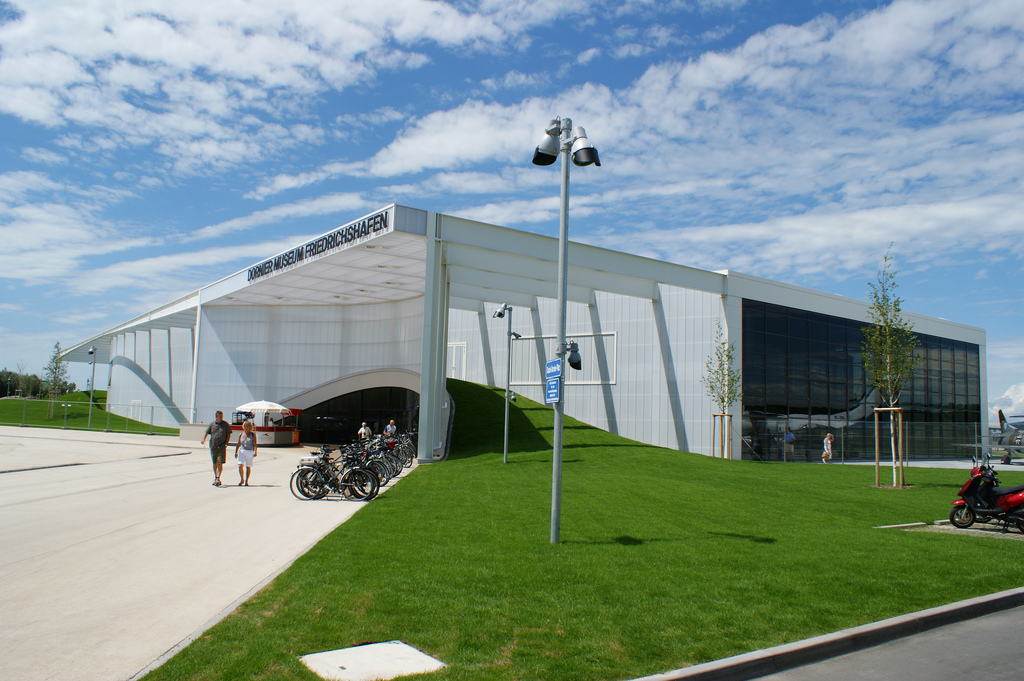
- Established: 24 July 2009
- Location: Friedrichshafen Airport, Baden-Württemberg
- Type: Aviation museum
- Director: Hans-Peter Rien
- Curator: Julia Menzer
- Website: dorniermuseum.de

The Dornier Museum Friedrichshafen is an aerospace museum located in the German town of Friederichshafen near Lake Constance. The museum exhibits the aircraft designs of Claude Dornier, the Dornier company and aerospace products of Airbus.

== Exhibits ==
Displayed at the museum are Dornier aircraft types (including licensed-production), unmanned aerial vehicles, models and historical photographs, plus aerospace equipment including satellites.

=== Aircraft ===
Exhibits include the following aircraft types, among other things like a car and Startrek memorabilia:

Bell UH-1D, Breguet Atlantic, Canadair CL-289, Dassault/Dornier Alpha Jet, Dornier Merkur, Dornier Do J Wal (Replica), Dornier Do 27, Dornier Do 28 A1, Dornier Do 28 D Skyservant, Dornier Do 29, Dornier Do 31 E1, Dornier 228, Dornier 328, Dornier Kiebitz, Fiat G.91.

=== Engines ===
A number of aircraft engines used by Dornier aircraft types are also displayed, among them :

Daimler-Benz DB 603 (Powered the Dornier Do 335), Bristol Siddeley Pegasus 5–2 (Main engine for the Dornier Do 31), Rolls-Royce RB 162-4D (Lift engine for the Dornier Do 31)

=== Satellites ===
GEOS, ISEE-B, Ulysses – First inter-planetary probe to the poles of the sun, European Remote-Sensing Satellite

== Gallery ==
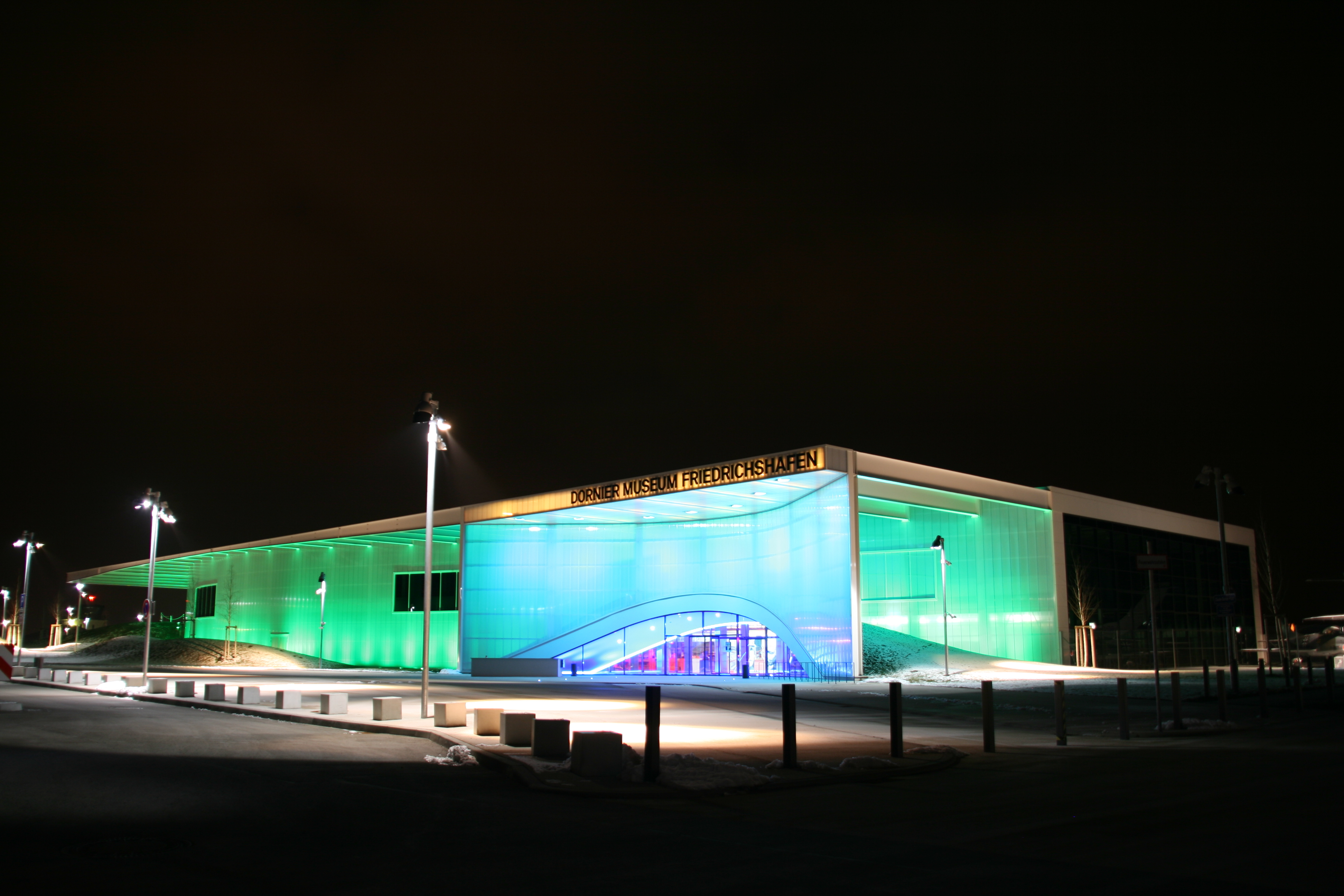
At Night

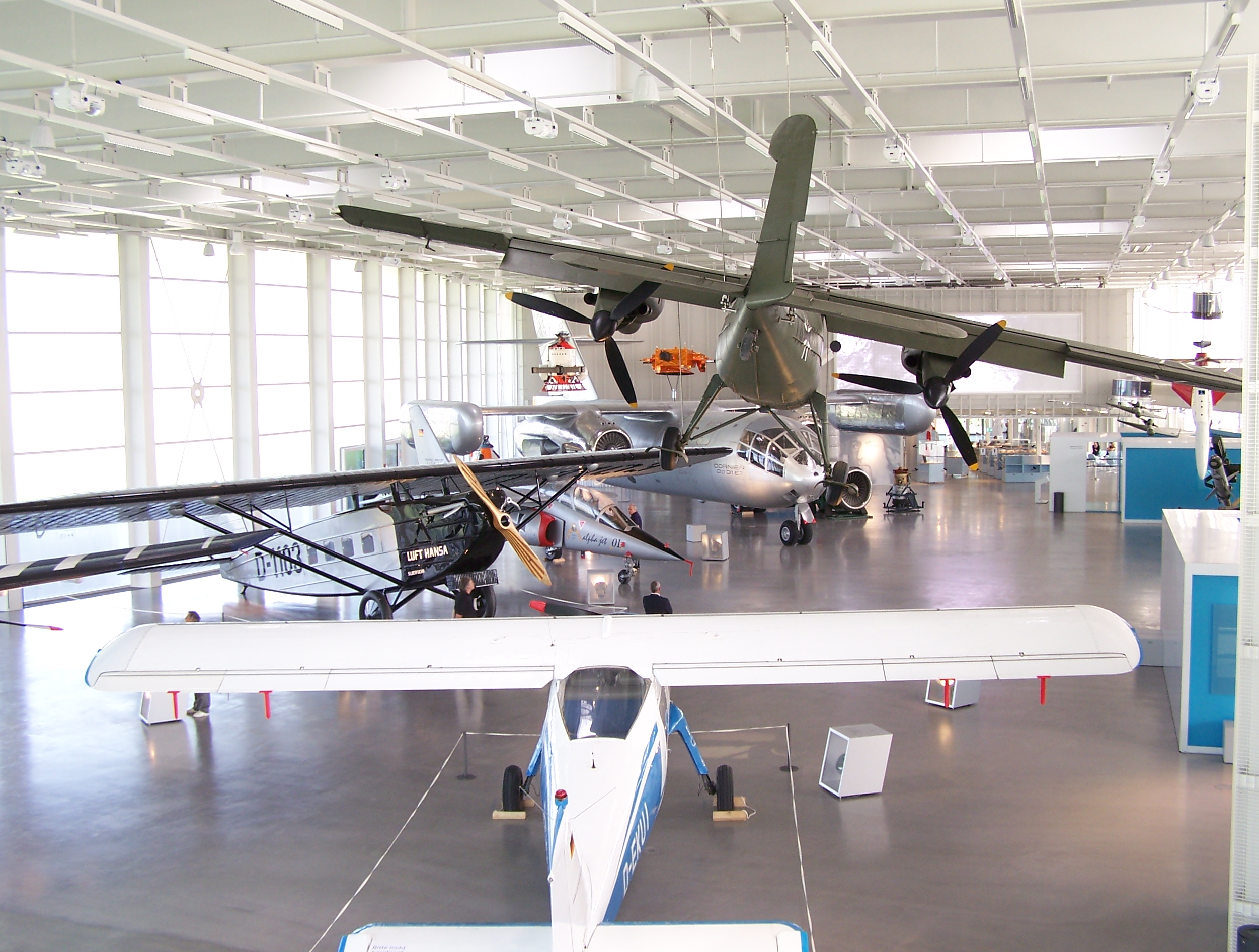
Aircraft on display in the main exhibition hall

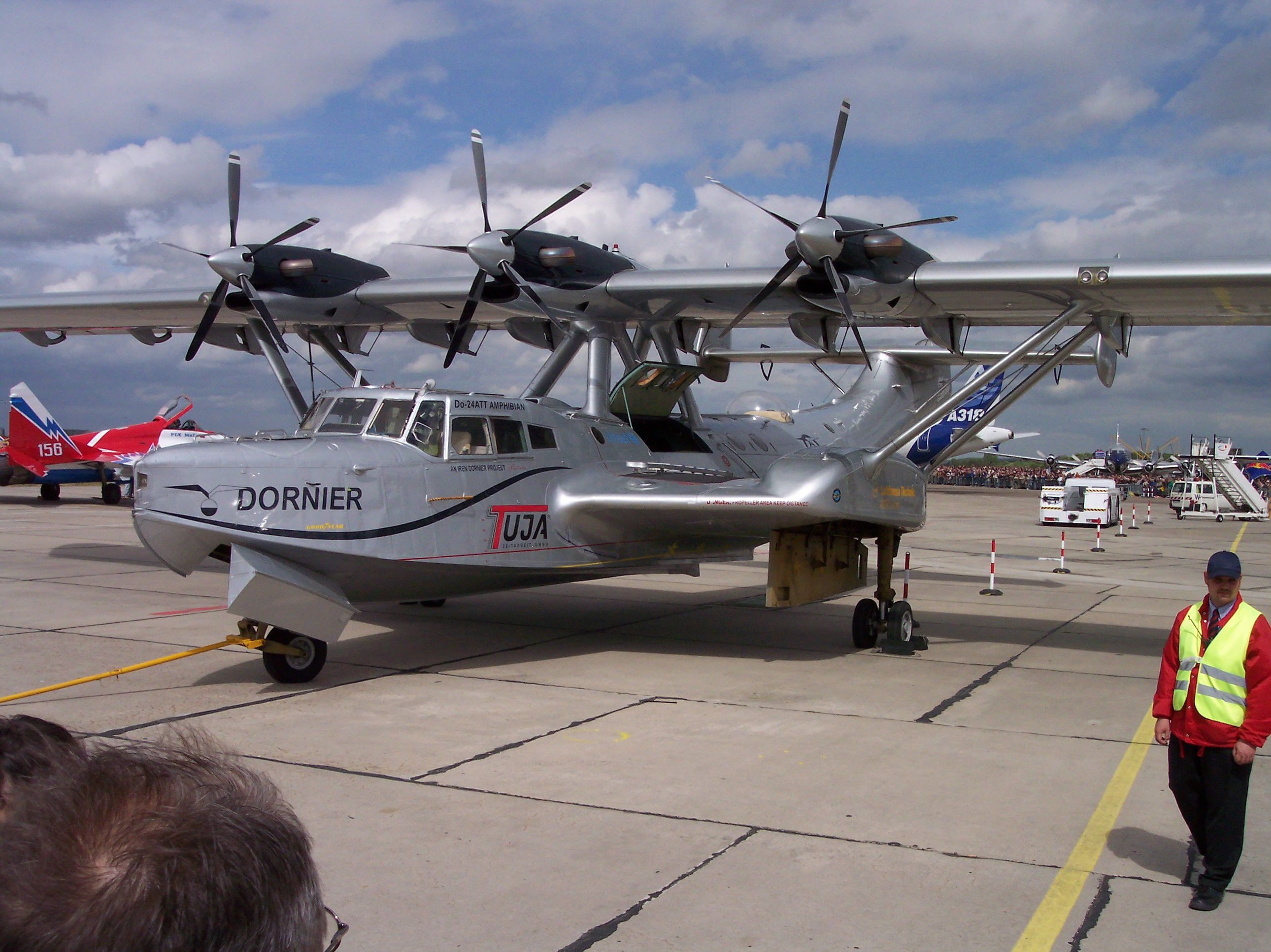
Do24 ATT

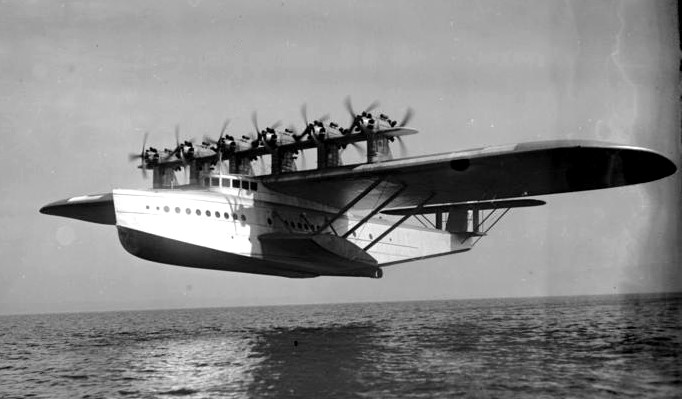
DoX

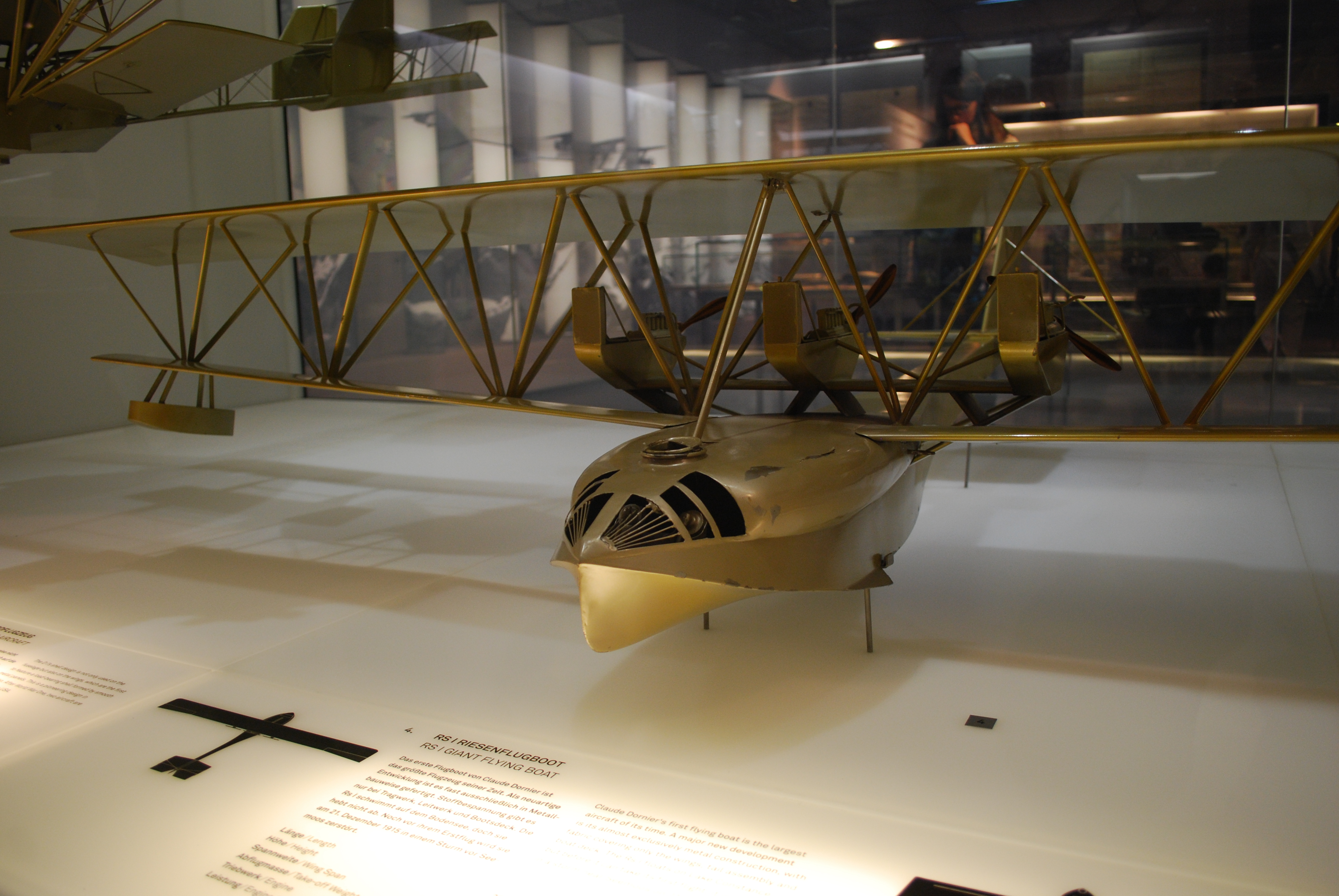
RS1

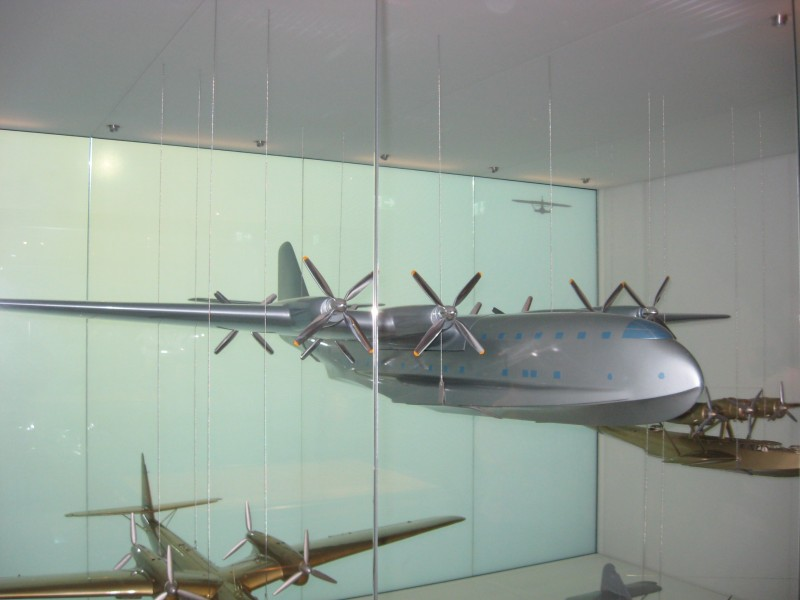
Do214

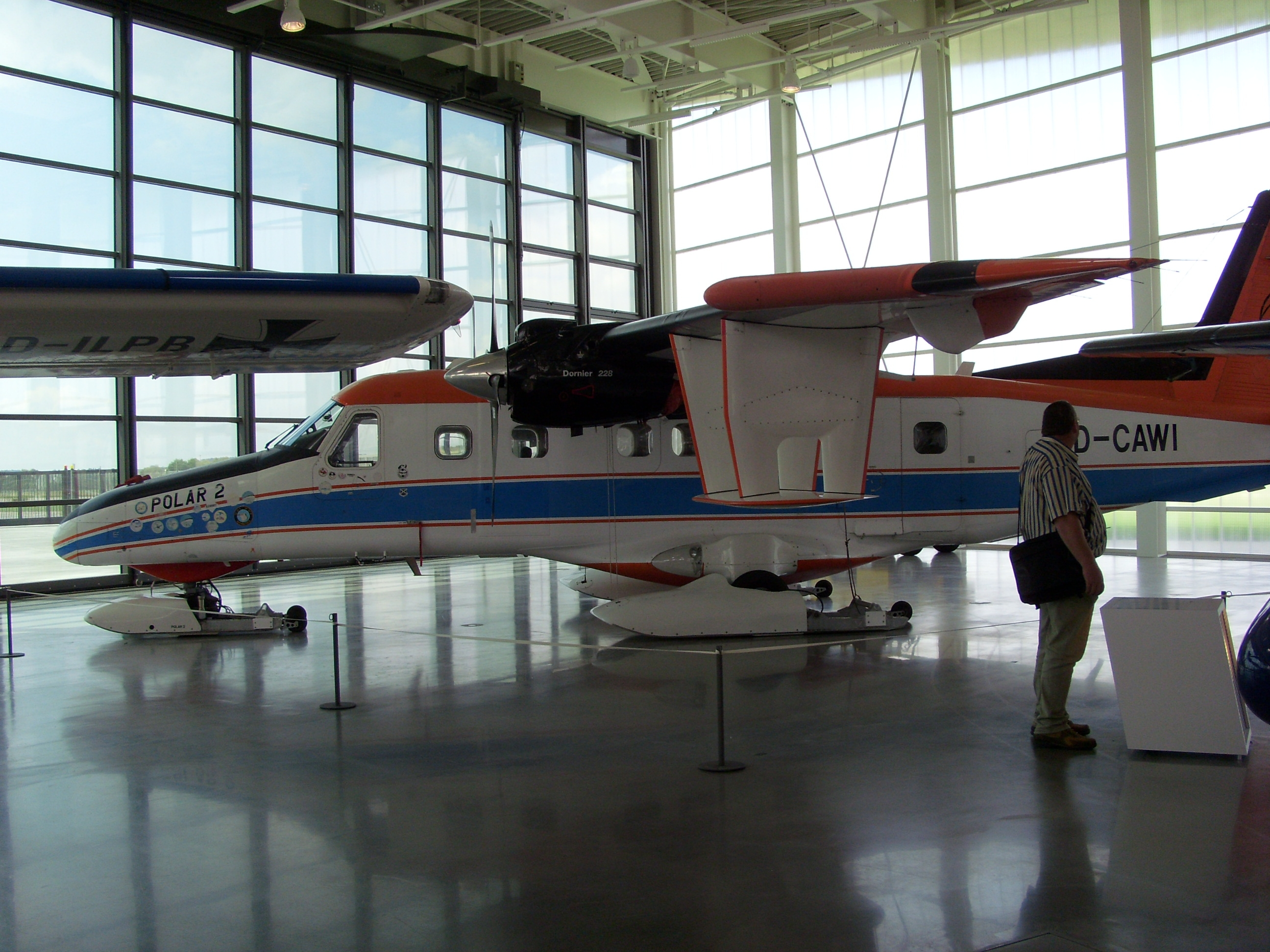
Do228

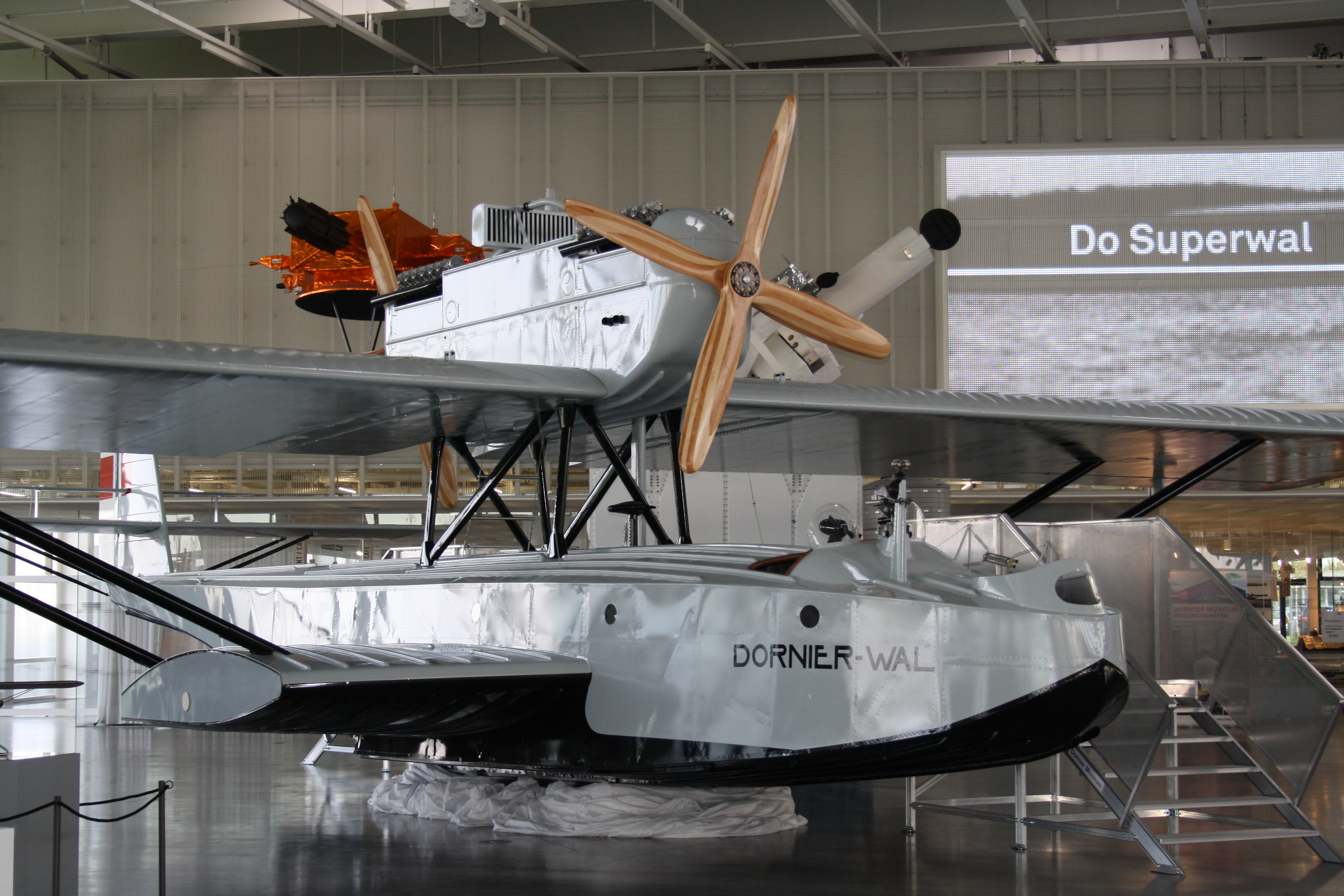
Dornier Wal N25

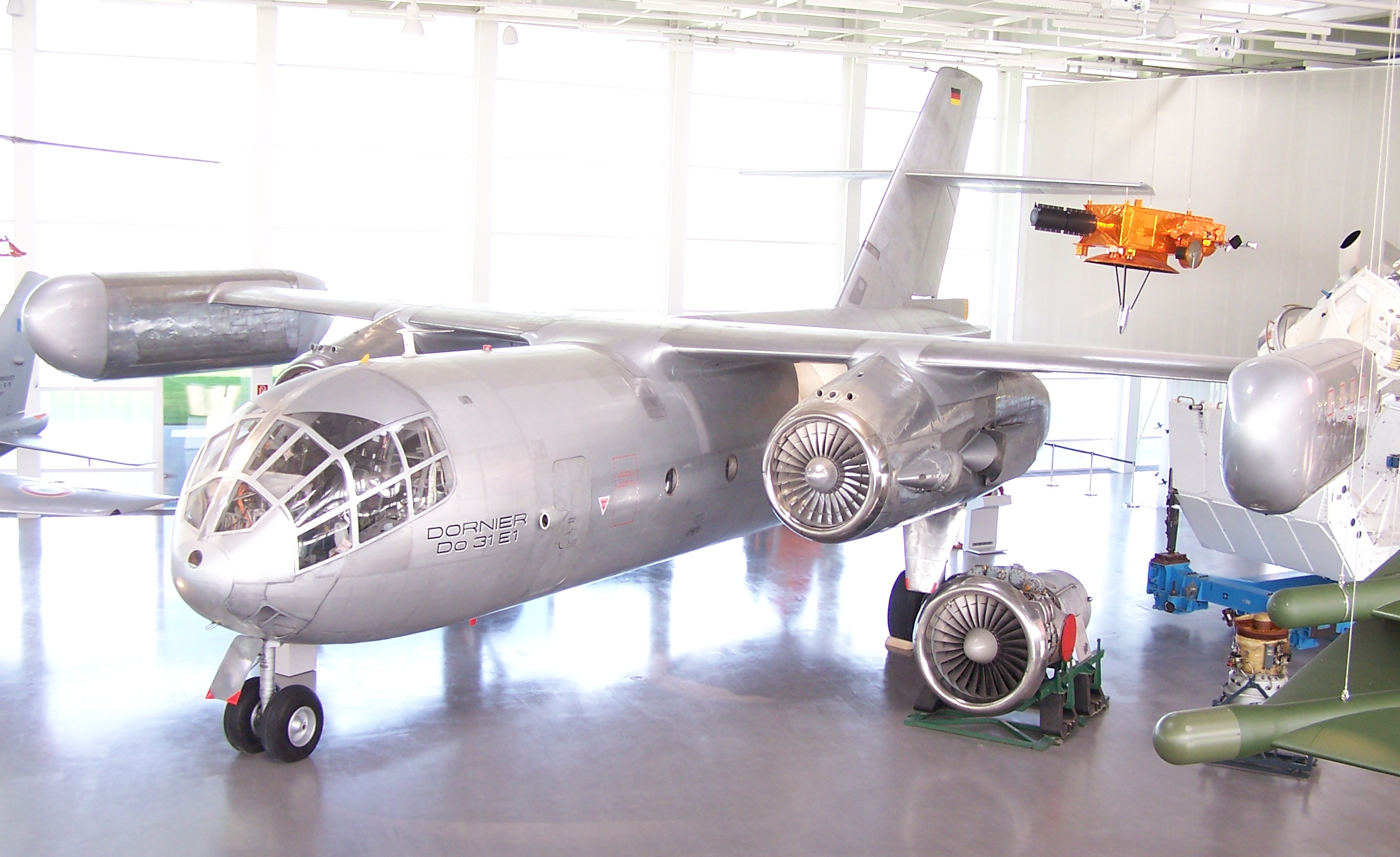
Do31

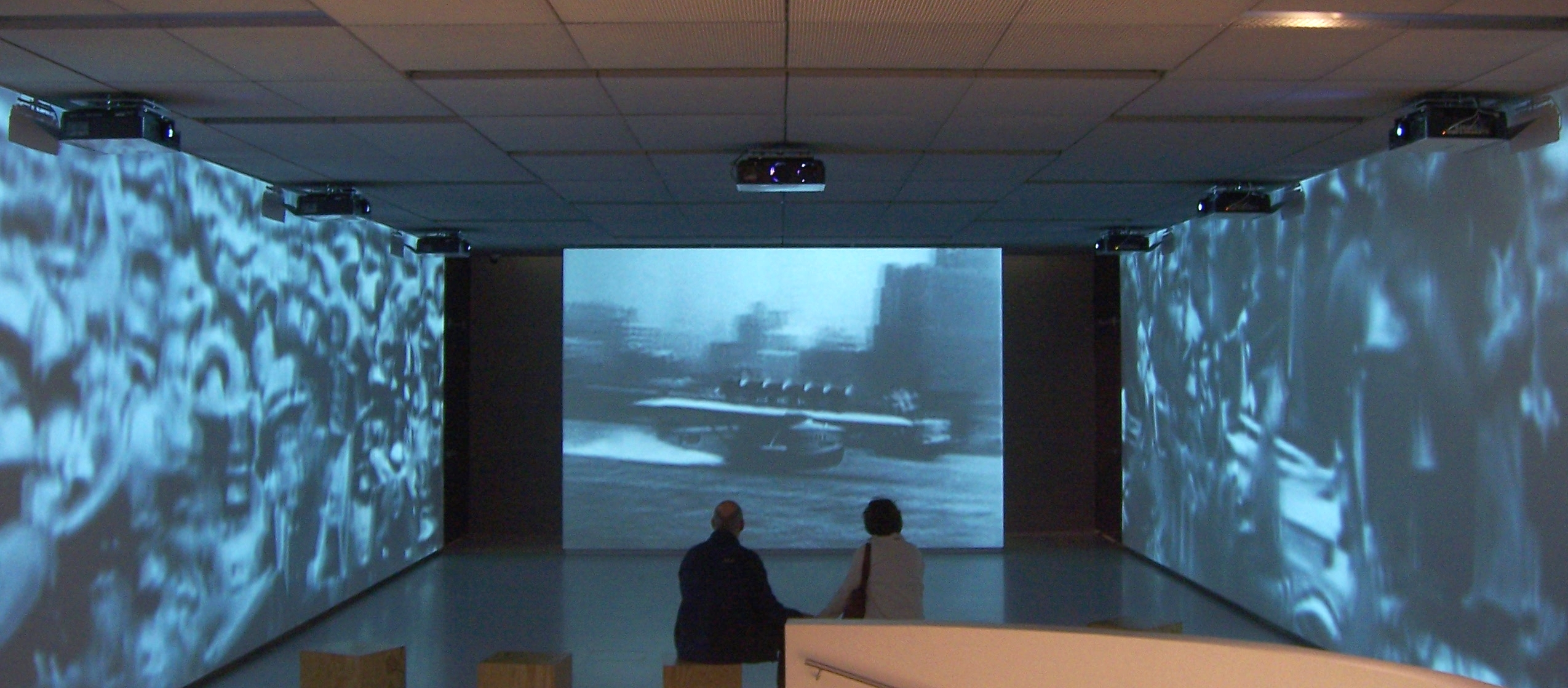
Museumsbox

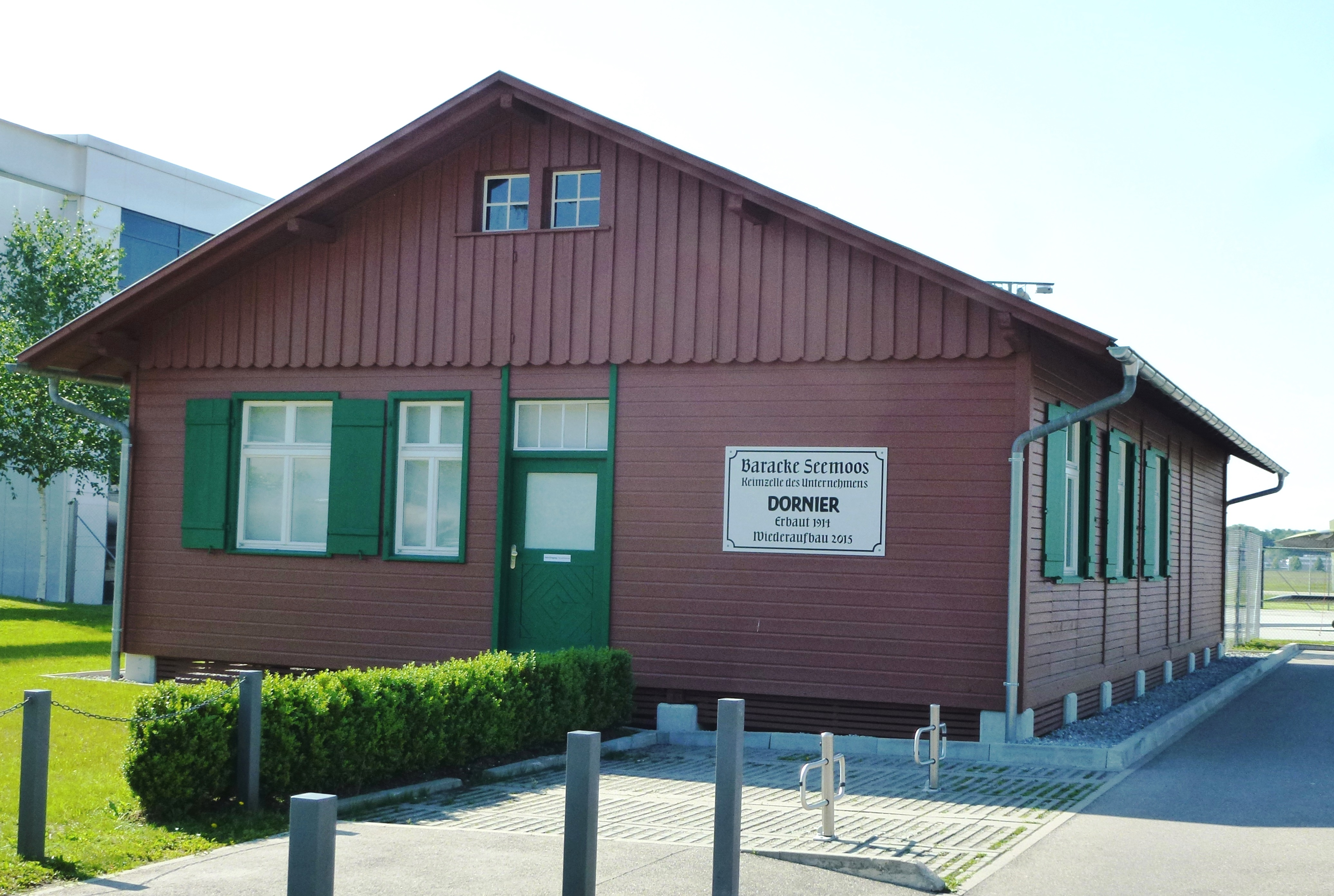
Seemoos 2016

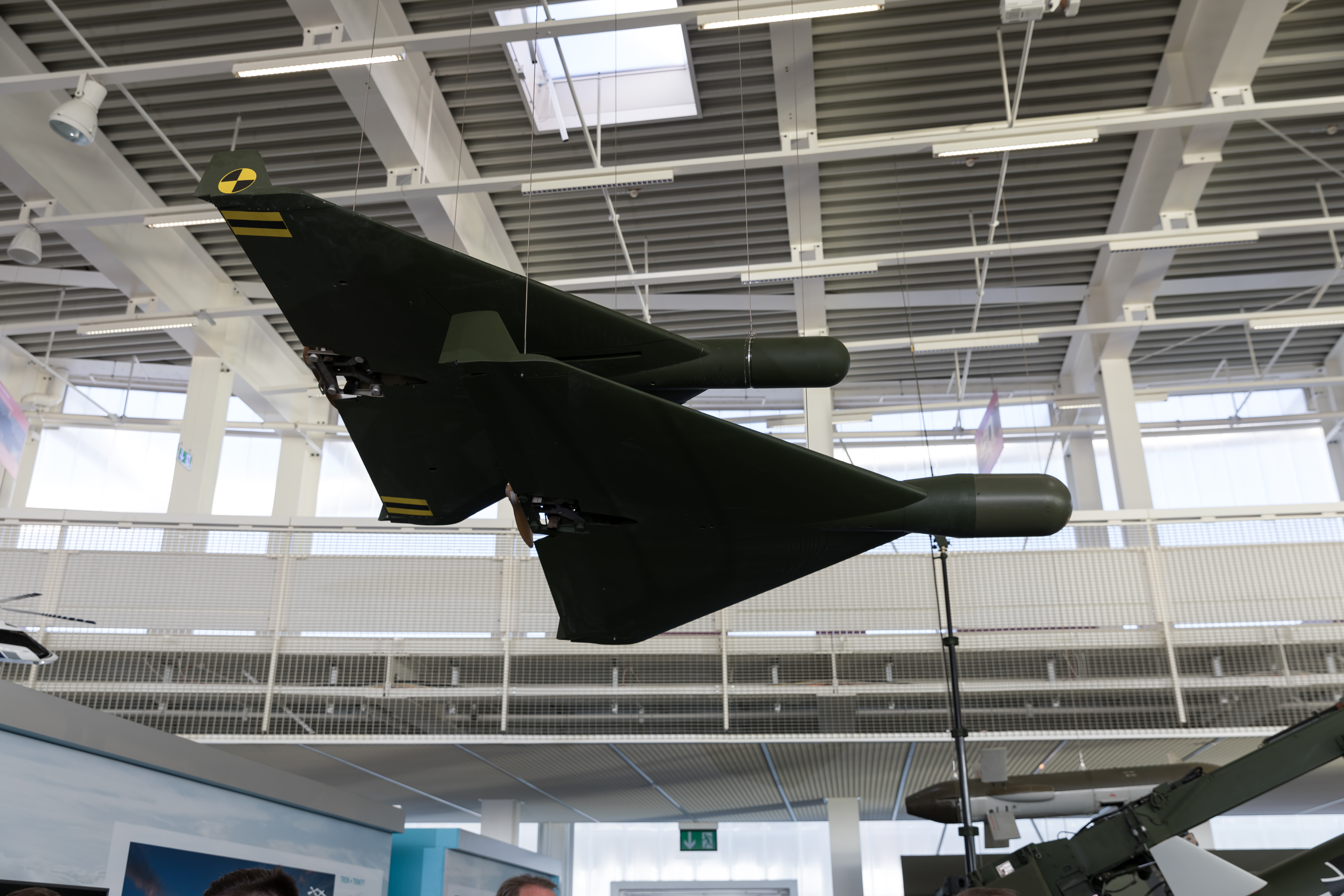
Dornier DAR (Drohne-Anti-Radar)

== See also ==
- List of aerospace museums
