= Vietnamese refugees in Israel =

Overview of Vietnamese people who fled the Vietnam War and settled in Israel

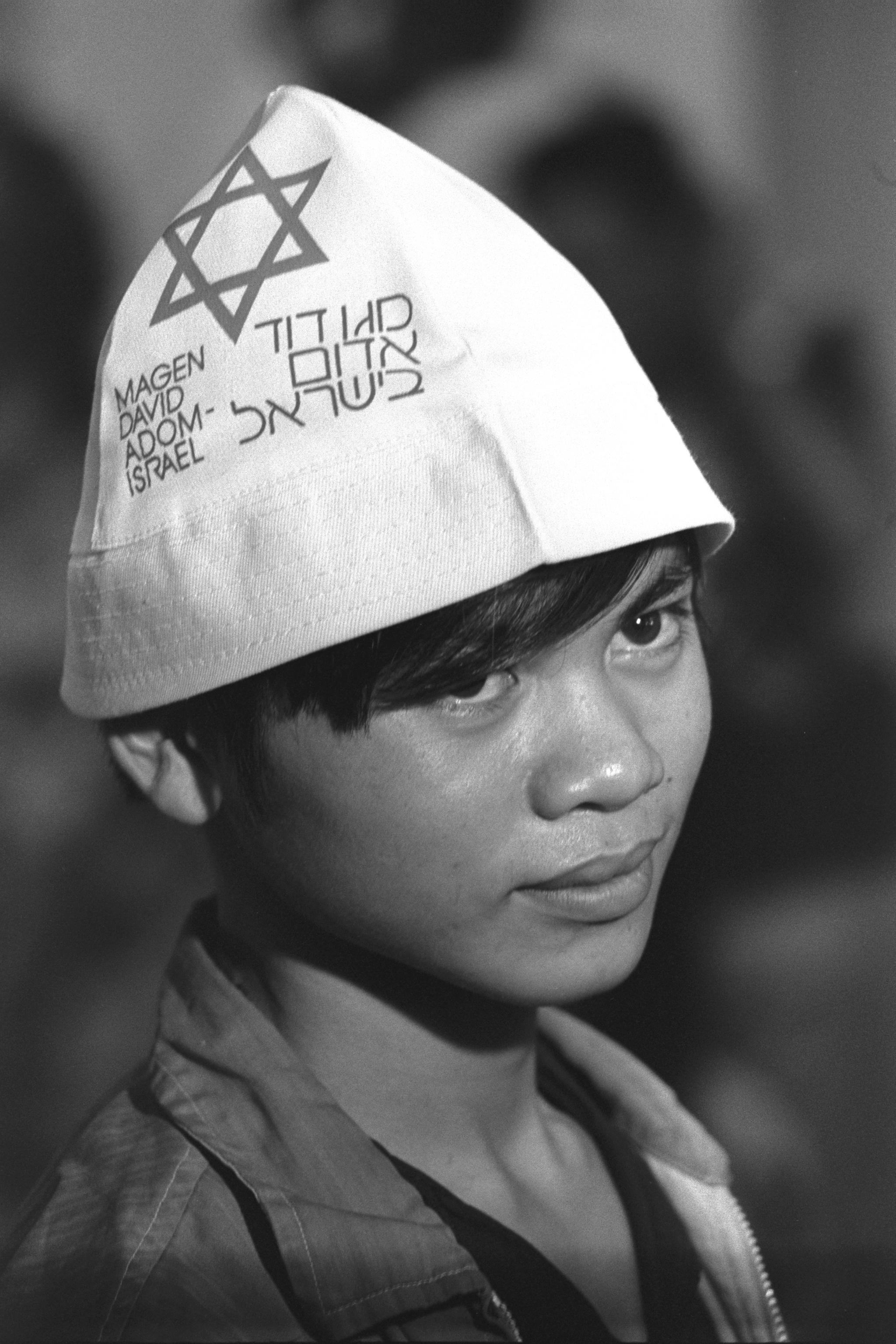
A Vietnamese boy with a Magen David Adom tembel hat at Ben Gurion Airport, June 26, 1977. Credit: Israeli Government Press Office.

Vietnamese refugees in Israel are a community of overseas Vietnamese who arrived in Israel from 1977 to 1979. The State of Israel permitted approximately 366 Vietnamese boat people fleeing the 1975 Communist takeover of Vietnam to enter the country during that time period.

== Rescue and arrival ==
The most well-known rescue operation took place on June 10, 1977 in which an Israeli freighter ship called the Yuvali, en route to Taiwan, sighted the passengers. This group of about 66 Vietnamese refugees was the first of three to arrive in Israel between 1977 and 1979. Those who remained in Israel as citizens are now known as Vietnamese-Israelis.

Prime Minister Menachem Begin was quoted as having compared them to Holocaust refugees:

"We never have forgotten the boat with 900 Jews, the St. Louis, having left Germany in the last weeks before the Second World War… traveling from harbor to harbor, from country to country, crying out for refuge. They were refused… Therefore it was natural… to give those people a haven in the Land of Israel."

Begin ordered Israeli diplomats to travel to refugee camps for the Vietnamese and offer them asylum in Israel. An Associated Press broadcast from October 26, 1979 covered one of the arrival flights in which a refugee stated he would like to thank the government of Israel and Prime Minister Menachem Begin "to give us a homeland while the other countries were still reluctant to take us when we left our country to flee from the barbaric regime of communism."

According to a report by JNS, in the refugee camps in the Philippines, Israel offered priority asylum to married couples. Many moved to the United States and France where they had relatives and one individual returned to Vietnam.

== Demographics ==
Many of the refugees settled around Jaffa and Bat Yam. Most Vietnamese-Israelis are Buddhist, but some are Christian or converts to Judaism. Many also practice syncretic ancestor worship and celebrate Vietnamese new year.

According to a special report on JNS, most immigrants only knew Vietnamese when they arrived and no Hebrew, however one individual, Phong Le Quan who served in the pro-American South Vietnam Army learned English from Americans and was able to assist the community as they struggled to communicate for even simple tasks due to a language barrier.

Some have Chinese ancestry or some Chinese cultural background. That may be attributed to the group of about 100 refugees who arrived in 1978, described as "ethnic Chinese people who have lived in Vietnam for generations". The first group of about 66 arrivals from 1977 were primarily Roman Catholics, and the group of about 192 refugees from 1979 were primarily of Kinh (Vietnamese) ethnic origin.

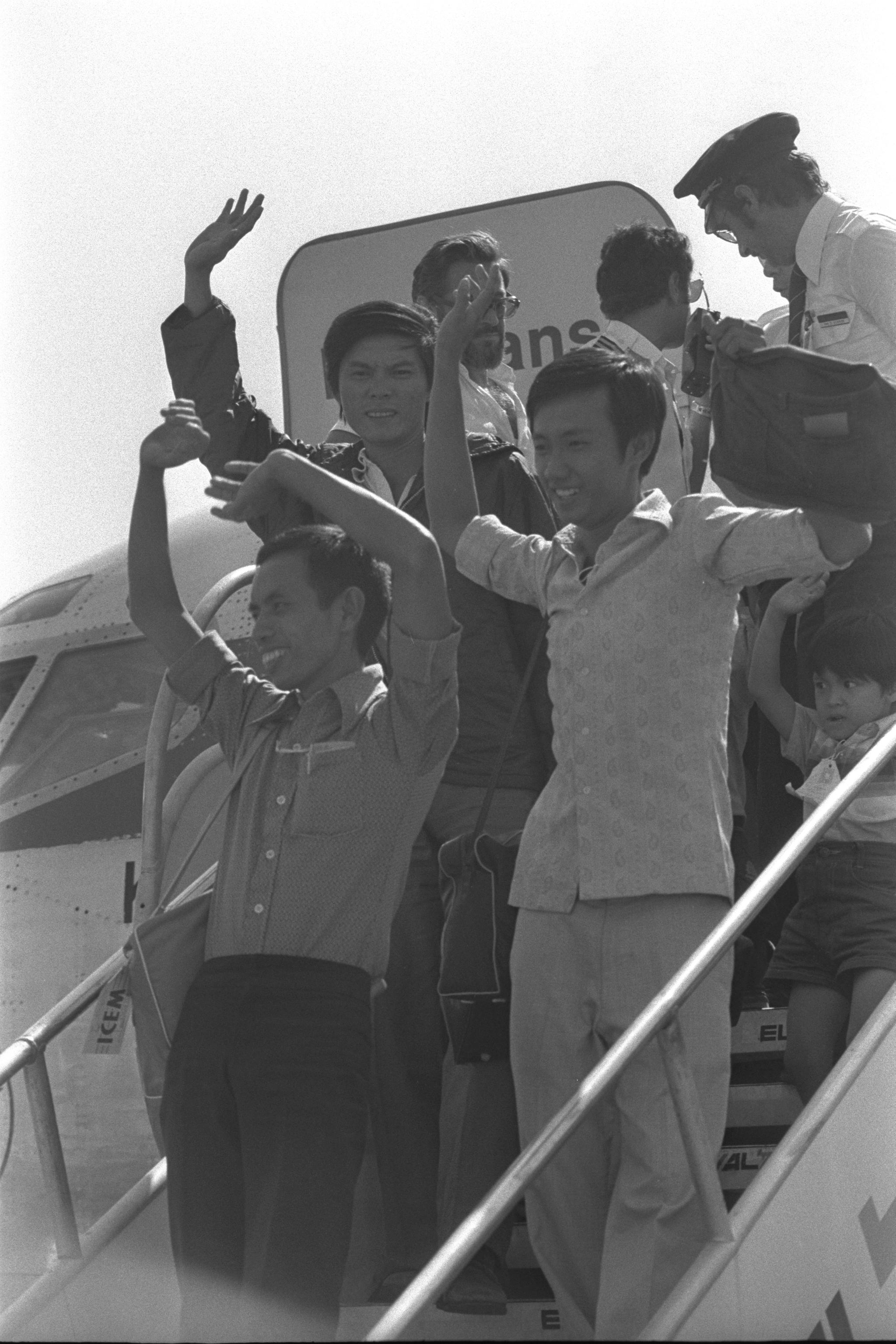
Vietnamese refugees happily waving to the welcoming crowd at Ben Gurion Airport, June 26, 1977. Credit: Israeli Government Press Office.

A 2008 paper estimated that there were about 150 to 170 people in the community, including spouses of non-Vietnamese origin. It also estimated this would make Vietnamese-Israelis one of the smallest minorities in Israel. There are approximately 150 to 200 former Vietnamese refugees and descendants were still in Israel. Meanwhile, about half left Israel, mainly for the USA and France to unite with relatives there. Some have even returned to Vietnam in recent years.

== Notable individuals ==
Prominent Vietnamese-Israelis include Vaan Nguyen, a poet and actress and subject of an award-winning documentary The Journey of Vaan Nguyen; Dr. Sabine Huynh, a translator, sociologist and author who fled Vietnam for France in 1976 and has lived in Israel since 2001; and Dao Rochvarger-Wong, who headed Bank Hapoalim in Singapore.

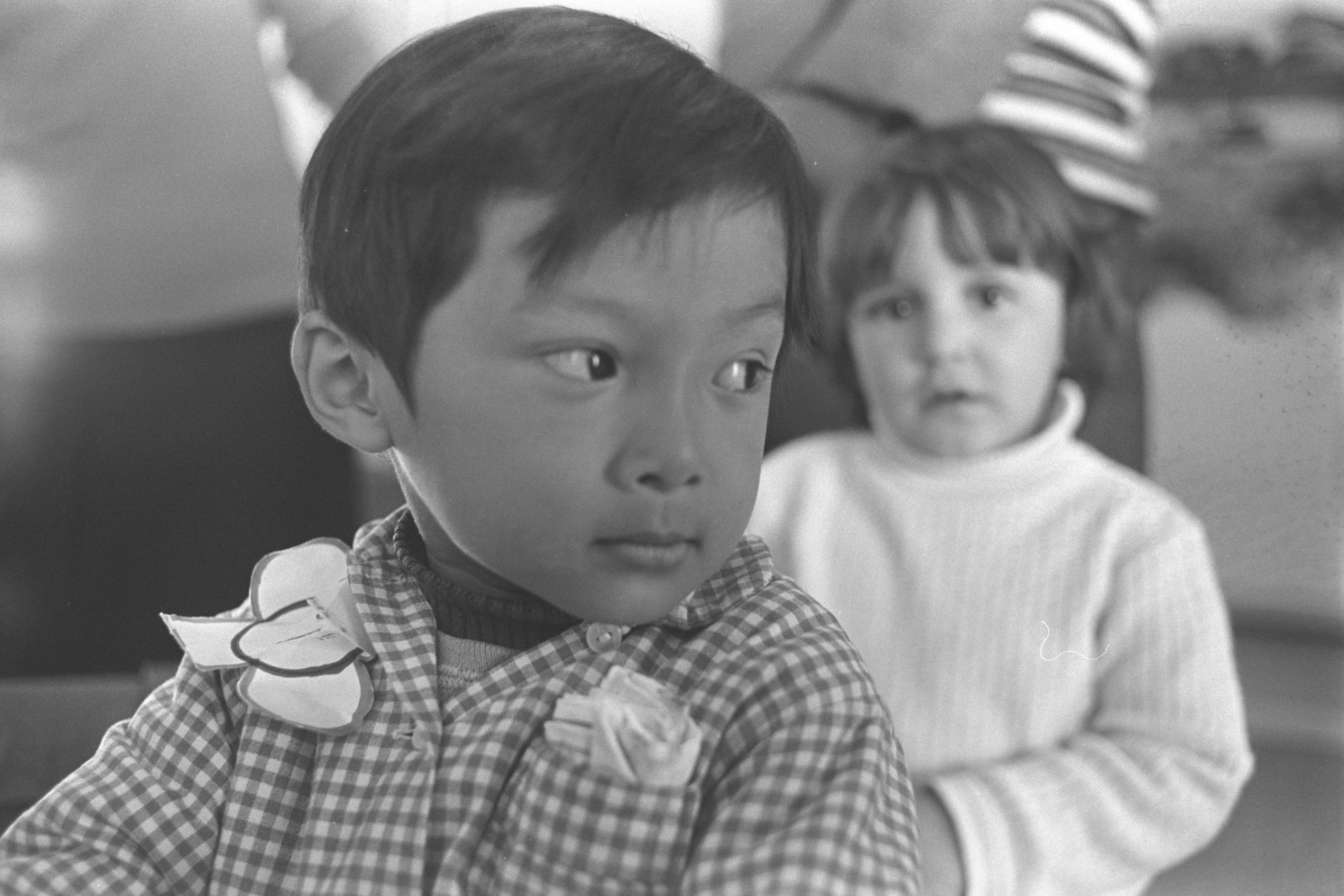
A Vietnamese boy in at WIZO kindergarten in Afula, February 4, 1979. Credit: Israeli Government Press Office.

== See also ==
- History of the Jews in Vietnam
- Israel–Vietnam relations
