= Ilya Kaminsky =

Ukrainian and American poet, critic, translator, and professor (born 1977)

- Ілля Камінський
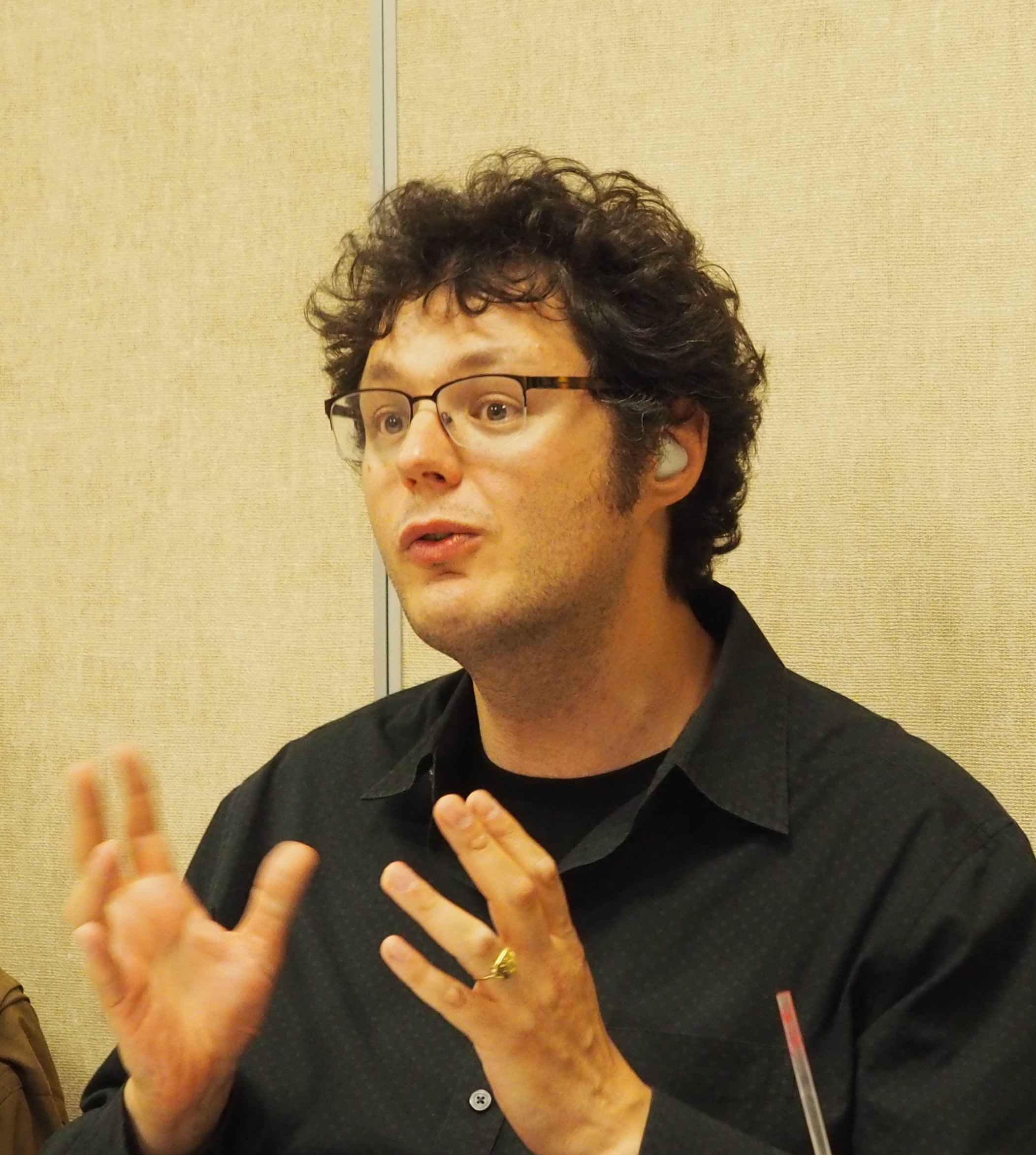
- Born: April 18, 1977 (age 49); Odessa, Ukrainian SSR, Soviet Union (now Odesa, Ukraine)
- Citizenship: United States
- Education: Georgetown University; University of California, Hastings College of the Law
- Spouse: Katie Farris
- Writing career
- Language: English and Russian
- Genre: Poetry
- Notable works: Dancing in Odesa; Deaf Republic

Ilya Kaminsky (Note: Ukrainian: Ілля Камінський, romanized: Illia Kaminskyi) (born April 18, 1977) is a poet, critic, translator and professor. He is best known for his poetry collections Dancing in Odesa and Deaf Republic, which have earned him several awards.

In 2019, the BBC named Kaminsky among "12 Artists who changed the world".

== Life ==
Kaminsky was born in Odessa, Ukrainian SSR, Soviet Union (now Ukraine) on April 18, 1977, to a Jewish family. He became hard of hearing at the age of four due to mumps. He began to write poetry as a teenager in Odesa. His family was granted asylum to live in the United States in 1993 due to antisemitism in Ukraine, and settled in Rochester, New York. He started to write poems in English in 1994.

Kaminsky is the author of critically acclaimed collections of poetry, Dancing in Odesa (2004) and Deaf Republic (2019). Both books were written in English, Kaminsky's second language.

Over the years, Kaminsky has also become known for his passionate advocacy of translation of international literature in the United States. A long-time poetry editor at Words Without Borders and Poetry International, he has also edited several anthologies of poetry from around the world, including Ecco Anthology of International Poetry (HarperCollins), which is widely used in classrooms all over the country. He has also founded and edited Poets in the World, a book series that is dedicated to publishing compilations of poetry from around the globe, including places such as Iraq, China, Eastern Europe, South America, and elsewhere. He has also edited and translated several collections of poetry from Ukraine.

Kaminsky has worked as a law clerk for San Francisco Legal Aid and the National Immigration Law Center. More recently, he worked pro-bono as the Court Appointed Special Advocate for Orphaned Children in Southern California. Currently, he is a professor at Princeton and lives in New Jersey.

== Critical reception ==
Writing for The New Yorker, Kevin Young called Deaf Republic "a contemporary epic. Evident throughout is a profound imagination, matched only by the poet's ability to create a republic of conscience that is ultimately ours, too"

In The New York Times, Parul Sehgal said: "I was stunned by Ilya Kaminsky's Deaf Republic, lyric poems presented as a play in two acts, set in a country in crisis, inspired both by Odesa, where Kaminsky grew up, and America, where he now lives. It's a book about censorship, political apathy, torture — 'the nakedness / of the whole nation' — but also about tomato sandwiches, the birth of a daughter and the sudden, almost shocking joys of longtime married life."

In The Guardian, Fiona Benson wrote: "I fell hard for Ilya Kaminsky's Deaf Republic. Part folklore, fable, war story and love poem, it imagines an occupied town falling deaf in response to the shooting of a child. Often devastating, always humane, this is a book of the century, let alone this year."

Washington Examiner calls Deaf Republic "a contemporary masterpiece. This book is proof that in 2019 great poetry can enjoy tremendous popularity."

About Kaminsky's first book, Dancing in Odesa, Robert Pinsky states: "Passionate, daring to laugh and weep, direct yet unexpected, Ilya Kaminsky's poetry has a glorious tilt and scope."

== Honors and awards ==
- 2023: American Academy of Arts and Sciences
- 2023: Kulturhuset Stadsteaterns Internationella Litteraturpris, Sweden, finalist, for "Dansa i Odessa" (translated by Lars Gustaf Andersson)
- 2022: Prix Alain Bosquet, France, for République sourde (translated by Sabine Huynh)
- 2022: Premio Laudomia Bonanni, Italy
- 2021: Honored by the Carnegie Corporation of New York's Great Immigrant Award.
- 2020: Los Angeles Times Book Prize for Deaf Republic: Poems
- 2020: Anisfield-Wolf Book Award, given to works that make important contributions to understanding racism and appreciation of rich diversity of human culture.
- 2019: Academy of American Poets fellowship
- 2019: National Book Award finalist for Deaf Republic
- 2019: National Book Critics Circle Award finalist for Deaf Republic
- 2019 Named by BBC as one of "12 artists who changed the world in 2019"
- 2019: The New York Times Notable Book of the Year for Deaf Republic
- 2019: National Jewish Book Award
- 2019: T. S. Eliot Prize finalist
- 2019: Forward Prize for Poetry, finalist
- 2018: Guggenheim Fellowship
- 2013: Neustadt International Prize for Literature finalist
- 2008: Lannan Literary Fellowship
- 2005: Whiting Award
- 2005: American Academy of Arts and Letters Metcalf Award
- 2001: Ruth Lilly Poetry Fellowship

Best Book of the Year

Deaf Republic was listed as The New York Times Notable Book and was named Best Book of the Year by numerous publications, including NPR, The Washington Post, The New York Times Book Review, Times Literary Supplement, Publishers Weekly, Financial Times, The Guardian, Irish Times, Library Journal, The Daily Telegraph, New Statesman, Slate, Vanity Fair, Literary Hub, Huffington Post, the New York Public Library, and American Library Association.

== Work ==
Kaminsky is best known for his poetry collections, Dancing in Odesa (2004) and Deaf Republic (2019). He is also known for his work in literary translation, his anthologies of international poetry and his literary essays.

=== Writings ===
- Musica Humana (poetry, Chapiteau Press, 2002) ISBN 978-1-931498-32-6
- Dancing in Odesa (poetry, Tupelo Press in USA and Faber in UK, 2004)
- Sonya's Fairytale (poetry, Bonnefant Press, Holland, 2010)
- It is the Soul that is Erotic (lyric essay, Orison Press, 2017)
- A Soul's Noise (lyric essay, Five Hundred Places Press, 2017)
- Deaf Republic (poetry, Graywolf in USA and Faber in UK, 2019)
- I See a Silence (a place-based poetry and installation at the former nuclear testing site, Artangel, UK National Trust, Suffolk, United Kingdom, 2021)

==== In translation ====
- Sagir Cumhuriyet, translated into Turkish (Harfa, Turkey, 2020)
- Kurtide vabariik, translated into Estonian (Loomingu Raamatukogu, Estonia, 2020)
- Dansað í Ódesa, translated into Icelandic (Dimma Publishers, Iceland, 2017)
- Tanzen in Odesa, translated into German (Klak Publishing House, Berlin, 2017)
- Танцувајќи во Одеcа, translated into Macedonian (Blesok Publishers, Macedonia, 2014)
- Bailando en Odesa, translated into Spanish (Valparaiso Ediciones, Mexico, 2014)
- Bailando en Odesa, translated into Spanish (Tupelo Press, USA, 2018)
- Musika Narodov Vetra, translated into Russian (Ailuros Publishing, 2013)
- Selected Poems and Essays, translated into Chinese (book, Shangai Literature and Art Publishing House, 2013)
- Bailando en Odesa, translated into Spanish, Libros del Aire, Madrid, 2012
- Dovenrepubliek, translated into Dutch (Azul Press, Amsterdam, Holland, 2011)
- Odesa'Da Dans, by Ilya Kaminsky, translated into Turkish, Cervi Siir, Istanbul, 2010
- On Dance a Odesa, by Ilya Kaminsky, (a book, Editions D'Art Le Sabord, Quebec, 2010)
- Бродячие музыканты translated into Russian (Moscow, Yunost, 2007)
- Dansand in Odesa, tr. into Romanian by Chris Tanasescu, (book, Editura Vinea, Bucharest, 2007)
- Рэспубліка глухіх, tr. into Belarusian by Julia Cimafiejeva and Valzhyna Mort (Skaryna Press, London, 2023)

==== Translations ====
- Traveling Musicians: Poems of Polina Barskova (Yunost Publishers, 2007)
- This Lamentable City: Poems of Polina Barskova (Tupelo Press, 2010)
- If I Were Born in Prague: Poems of Guy Jean (Argos Press, 2011)
- Mourning Ploughs Winter: Poems of Guy Jean (Marick Press, 2012)
- Dark Elderberry Branch: Poems of Marina Tsvetaeva (Alice James Books, 2012)
- A Small Suitcase of Russian Poetry: An Anthology of Translations (Henry Miller Museum, Ping-Pong Free Press, 2016)
- The Country Where Everyone's Name Is Fear: Poems of Boris and Luidmila Khersonsky (Lost Horse Press, 2022)

Anthologies edited

- Ecco Anthology of International Poetry (HarperCollins, 2010)
- Homage to Paul Celan (Marick Press, 2012)
- A God in the House (Tupelo Press, 2012)
- Gossip and Metaphysics: Russian Modernist Poems and Prose (Tupelo Press, 2014)
- In Shape of a Human Body I am Visiting This Earth: Poems from Far and Wide (McSweeneys, 2017)
- In the Hour of War: Poetry from Ukraine (Arrowsmith Press, 2023)

Book series edited

Poets in the World, a book series edited by Ilya Kaminsky:

- Pinholes in the Night: Essential Poems from Latin America, editors Raul Zúrita and Forrest Gander (Copper Canyon Press)
- Seven New Generation African Poets, editors Kwame Dawes and Chris Abani (Slapering Hol Press)
- Fifteen Iraqi Poets, editor Dunya Mikhail (New Directions)
- Another English: Anglophone Poems from Around the World, editors Catherine Barnett and Tiphanie Yanique (Tupelo Press)
- Elsewhere, editor Eliot Weinberger (Open Letter Books)
- Bones Will Crow: An Anthology of Burmese Poetry, editor Ko Ko Thett and James Byrne (Northern Illinois University Press)
- Landays: Poetry of Afghan Women, editor Eliza Griswold, Special Issue of Poetry magazine
- New Cathay: Contemporary Chinese Poetry, editor Ming Di (Tupelo Press)
- Something Indecent: Poems Recommended by Eastern European Poets, editor Valzhyna Mort (Red Hen Press)
- The Star by My Head: Poets from Sweden, editors Malena Mörling and Jonas Ellerström (Milkweed Editions)
- Open the Door: How to Excite Young People about Poetry, editors Dorothea Lasky, Dominic Luxford and Jesse Nathan
- The Strangest of Theatres: Poets Writing Across Borders, editors Jared Hawkley, Brian Turner and Susan Rich (McSweeneys)

=== Non-fiction ===
In 2018, Kaminsky published in The New York Times Magazine a widely discussed lyric essay about deafness and his return to Odesa, Ukraine, after many years away.

He also writes essays on various subjects such as borders, creative life in the age of surveillance, and poetics of Paul Celan, for publications such as The Guardian, The New York Times, and Poetry.

=== Selected poems and essays ===
Poems

- Poems from Deaf Republic in The New Yorker
- A selection of Kaminsky's poems at Poetry website
- A selection of Kaminsky's poems at the Academy of American Poets website
- A selection of Kaminsky's poems at The Massachusetts Review website
- "Musica Humana" at Poetry International Rotterdam website
- "Elegy for Joseph Brodsky" at Poetry International Rotterdam website
- "We Lived Happily During the War" at Poetry Magazine website
- "Author's Prayer" at Poetry website

Essays

- "Searching for a Lost Odesa -- and a Deaf Childhood" in The New York Times Magazine
- "Of Strangeness that Wakes Us: On Mother Tongues, Fatherlands, and Paul Celan" in Poetry
