= Israel–Vietnam relations =

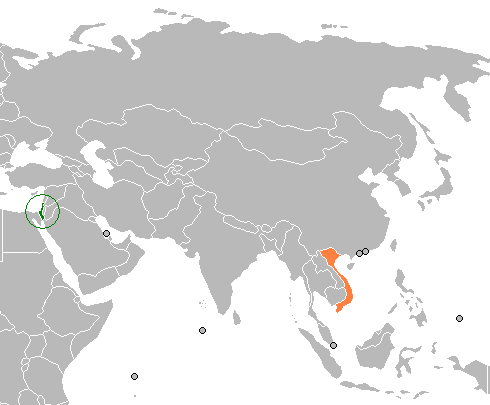
- Israel: Vietnam

Diplomatic mission
- Israeli embassy, Hanoi: Vietnamese embassy, Tel Aviv

Israel–Vietnam relations (Hebrew: יחסי ישראל-וייטנאם; Vietnamese: Quan hệ Israel - Việt Nam) refers to the bilateral relations between the State of Israel and the Socialist Republic of Vietnam. Vietnam and Israel established diplomatic relations on July 12, 1993, followed by Israel opening its resident embassy in Hanoi in December 1993. The current Vietnamese ambassador to Israel is Lý Đức Trung, who has been assigned since April 2022 and operated out of the Vietnamese embassy in Tel Aviv. The current Israeli ambassador to Vietnam is Yaron Mayer, who has been assigned since August 2022 and operated out of the Israeli embassy in Hanoi.

Relations between the two nations are generally friendly and stable. Vietnam has expressed its interest in boosting defense ties with Israel. There are also many Vietnamese working in Israel, and Israel has also delivered humanitarian aid to Vietnam on several occasions. According to reports, some 2,000 Vietnamese students study in Israel. Israel and Vietnam also cooperate in such fields as agriculture, information technology, and biotech, and cultural exchanges between the two countries are quite extensive. Vietnam is Israel's largest trading partner in Southeast Asia.

== History ==
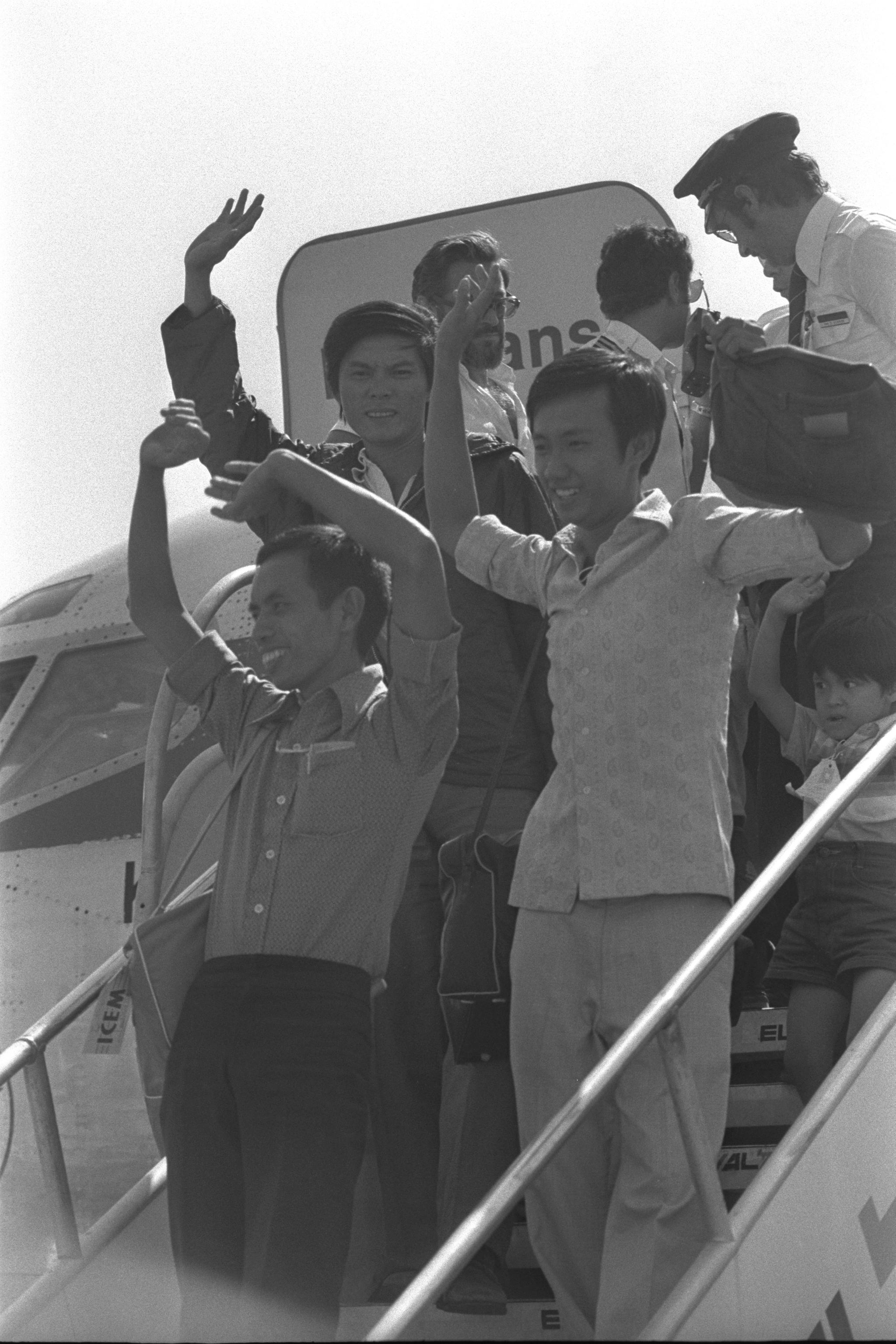
Vietnamese refugees arriving at Ben Gurion International Airport, Israel, 1977

Between 1977 and 1979, the State of Israel allowed approximately 360 Vietnamese refugees to enter the country. The most well-known rescue operation took place on June 10, 1977 in which an Israeli freighter ship called the Yuvali, en route to Taiwan, sighted the passengers.

Vietnam and Israel established diplomatic relations on July 12, 1993. Israel opened its resident Embassy in Hanoi in December 1993, with David Matnai appointed as the first Ambassador to Vietnam.

The first resident Vietnamese ambassador to Israel was Đinh Xuân Lưu, who presented his credentials to Israeli President Shimon Peres on July 8, 2009. The ambassador operates out of an embassy at 4 Weizman Street in Tel Aviv, Israel, a first since the establishment of diplomatic relations in 1993. The previous ambassador was a non-resident ambassador, operating from Cairo. At their meeting, President Shimon Peres told the new ambassador: "I congratulate the Vietnamese government on their decision to establish an embassy in Israel. The establishment of an embassy opens a new era in the relationship of the two countries."

Since establishing diplomatic relations, the two countries have strengthened ties through reciprocal visits and collaborations in business, education, culture, technology, and agriculture. The visits arranged by the Israeli government included those of delegations comprising entrepreneurs and businessmen, academic groups, journalists, artists and musicians, legal workers, and so on.

In January 2010, Luu said that it was key for Israel to increase its cooperation with Vietnam via its strong wherewithal in high-potential high-tech areas such as information technology, aerospace, and biological technologies applied to agriculture to boost farming productivity, which were important areas in Vietnam's modernization. In September 2011, he and Vietnamese Ministry of Defence Deputy Minister Lieutenant General Truong Quang Khanh led a working delegation from the defense ministry in a visit to Israel. In July 2012, he spoke of strong ties between Vietnam and Israel, and the possibilities for initiating future partnerships.

In November 2011, at the invitation of Vietnam's President Trương Tấn Sang, Israeli President Shimon Peres had an official visit to Vietnam from the 21st to the 27th, accompanied by Ministers and business delegation. This first high-ranking visit aimed at strengthening and expanding political and economic strategic ties between Israel and Vietnam.

In September 2012, Luu said that friendship and cooperation between Israel and Vietnam had its roots in a meeting in 1946 between Democratic Republic of Vietnam Prime Minister and President Ho Chi Minh and David Ben-Gurion. He also said that trade between the two countries had risen to $660 million in the first eight months of 2012. He spoke of cooperation between the two countries in agriculture, water technologies, IT, telecommunication, education, and homeland security.

Future president of Vietnam, Trần Đại Quang, visited Israel in 2014 and met with president Reuven Rivlin.

Israeli minister Tzipi Hotovely visited Vietnam in August 2015. Vietnamese deputy PM visited Israel on December of that year and met with prime minister Benjamin Netanyahu and other Israeli officials.

In 2016, Vietnamese deputy prime minister Vương Đình Huệ said Vietnam should learn from Israel how to develop a start-up ecosystem.

In October 2016, Vietnamese president Trần Đại Quang met with Israeli ambassador to Vietnam, Meirav Eilon Shahar, and praised the warm ties between the two countries. He further stated Israel and Vietnam need to boost their economic and business ties and to even open a direct route between them in order to facilitate their cooperation and tourism.

Public security minister of Vietnam, General To Lam visited Israel in November 2016 and met with Israeli prime minister Benjamin Netanyahu.

Receiving the credentials of the Vietnamese ambassador to Israel, Ly Duc Trung, in August 2022, Israeli President Isaac Herzog expressed his desire to expand Israeli-Vietnamese collaboration in the fields of trade, agriculture, innovation and more.

On July 23, 2023, Israel and Vietnam celebrated 30 years of bilateral diplomatic relations, and two days later, the two countries signed a free trade agreement.

In August 2023, it was announced that Vietnam would add Israel to its electronic visa waiver program, and that direct flights between the two countries were supposed to begin for the first time in October 2023. However, the plan was halted indefinitely due to the Gaza war.

== Economic relations ==
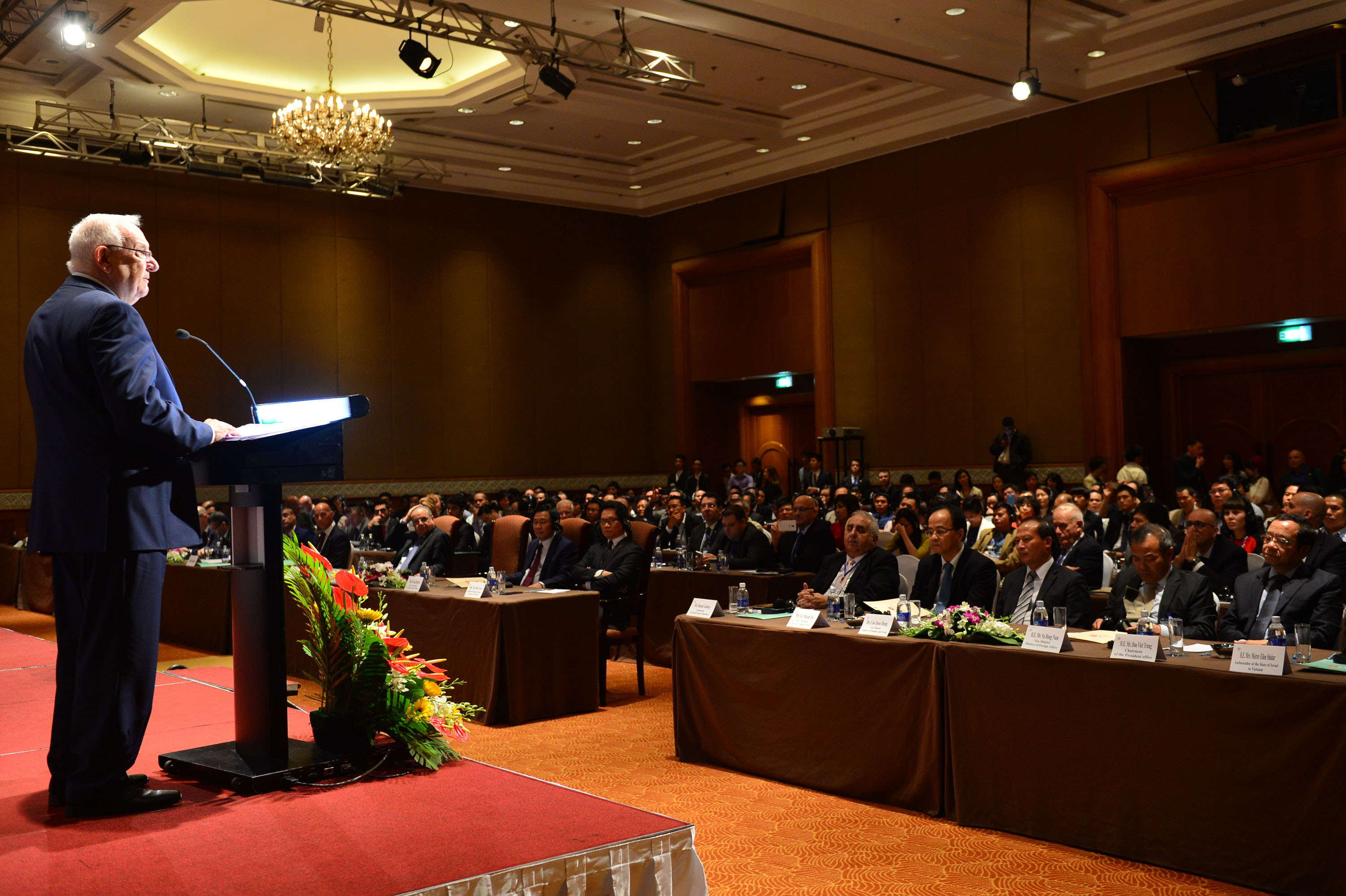
President Reuven Rivlin at an economic conference in Hanoi, 21 March 2017

Israeli businessmen have shown considerable interest in Vietnam and organized many business trips to the country to explore investment opportunities in agriculture, aquaculture, tourism, oil and gas exploitation and production, telecommunications, and pharmacy. In August 2004, Israel and Vietnam signed an Agreement of Economic and Trade Cooperation, an important legal basis for the further development of trade. The two-way trade turnover has reached 70 million US dollars in 2005. Two Israeli corporations, Agronet and Astraco, have opened offices in Hanoi.

Technology and know-how developed at Kibbutz Afikim will be used in a half-a-billion-dollar milk production project in Vietnam. The project involves establishing a dairy of 30,000 cows to supply 500,000 liters of milk a day, about 40% of Vietnam's present milk consumption. Afikim will be responsible for all stages of the enterprise, including breeding and preparing land for crops that will be used as feed.

The governments of Vietnam and Israel signed an agreement on double tax avoidance in Hanoi on August 4, 2009, creating a transparent and healthy legal environment for their businesses to increase transactions. Signatories to the document were Deputy Minister of Finance Tran Xuan Ha and Israeli Ambassador to Vietnam Effie Ben Matityau. They both stressed the importance of the agreement in promoting economic and trade cooperation between the two countries. Israel and Vietnam are also working on completing a free-trade agreement, that would further enhance the business relationship between the two countries.

The Israeli government has helped train and educate Vietnamese in the science of agriculture, aquaculture, livestock, and dairy milk production. Vietnam, which is now considered one of the leading economies in the developing world, relies part of its success on Israeli technology and agricultural development.

On July 25, 2023, Israel and Vietnam signed a free trade agreement. The deal is expected to raise trade between the two nations by 50%, and Vietnam's Ministry of Industry and Trade predicted the deal would eventually bring bilateral trade to $3 billion. Furthermore, the Ministry announced the agreement would remove duties on at least 86% of Vietnamese products and 93% of Israeli products.

In August 2026, El Al announced that it would be unable to start its planned three flights per week on the route between Ben Gurion Airport in Tel Aviv and Noi Bai International Airport in Hanoi, scheduled to begin in October, as the airline was unable to obtain security clearances from Israeli security agencies under the authority of the Shin Bet.

Israel - Vietnam trade in millions USD-$
	Israel imports Vietnam exports	Vietnam imports Israel exports	Total trade value
2023	220.9	171.5	392.4
2022	278.2	175	453.2
2021	337.5	158.9	496.4
2020	386.9	159.3	546.2
2019	646.3	117.2	763.5
2018	612.4	135.3	747.7
2017	598.8	104.7	703.5
2016	442.3	1199.8	1642.1
2015	408.9	1789.2	2198.1
2014	380.1	669	1049.1
2013	294.1	678.1	972.2
2012	208.3	721	929.3
2011	129.8	340.8	470.6
2010	84.6	124.8	209.4
2009	71.5	117.6	189.1
2008	140	79.4	219.4
2007	64.2	70.9	135.1
2006	45.3	40.5	85.8
2005	37.2	35.5	72.7
2004	33.4	28.9	62.3
2003	23.5	18	41.5
2002	19.5	10.7	30.2

== Assistance to Vietnam ==
Israel has also dispatched many specialists to Vietnam to give in-service training to their Vietnamese colleagues, especially in agriculture. Government officials and professionals from various ministries in Vietnam have visited Israel to study tours as well as for trainings. Various on-the-spot courses have been conducted in various fields, such as agriculture, aquaculture, livestock, dairy milk production and education, under the auspices of MASHAV, the Israeli Center for International Cooperation.

=== Technology ===
A forum to further scientific and technological cooperation between Vietnam and Israel took place in Hanoi on January 18, 2010, drawing the participation of close to 160 businesses from both countries. Speaking at this first forum of its kind in Vietnam, Vice Chairman of the Vietnam Chamber of Commerce and Industry (VCCI) Pham Gia Tuc, stated that the Vietnamese government sees Israel as an important partner in its policy to boost multi-faceted cooperation with countries in the Middle East.

In 2016, a group of Vietnamese students and teachers traveled to Israel to learn about robotics and start-ups.

=== Military ===
Vietnam has obtained Israeli Spyder and Heron drones over time. At the end of January 2026, the defense ministry of Vietnam signed a contract worth US$250 million with Israel’s Rafael Advanced Defence Systems to locally produce Spike Fireflies in Vietnam. As of April 2026, Israel was Vietnam’s second most important defence supplier, second to Russia. According to the Database of Israeli Military and Security Export, Vietnam entered the top 5 largest importers of Israeli arms since 2015.

== Cultural ties ==
In 2014, Vietnam hosted an Israeli film festival, in celebration of 20 years of diplomatic relations between the two countries.

Numerous Israeli books have been translated to Vietnamese. These include the 2024 translation of Yuval Noah Harari's "Nexus: A brief history of information networks from the stone age to artificial intelligence" which was named among the top five most popular translated books among Vietnamese readers this year. The Vietnamese literary translator Nguyen An Ly, winner of the 2023 U.S. National Translation Award, is noted in Vietnamese and international literary profiles for having translated works by Israeli author Amos Oz.

Israeli chef Shahar Lubin (founder of an Hanoi Middle Eastern gastro-pub) partnered with the Israeli Embassy to host in 2016 a Vietnam-Israel gastronomy friendship week creating menus blending Israeli dishes (such as shakshuka and falafel) with Vietnamese ingredients (such as nuoc mam fish sauce, bun cha and fresh local herbs).

Israeli artist Jennifer Amouyal held an exhibition in Tel Aviv Israel showcasing paintings inspired by the Vietnamese culture and people, especially from the Lao Cai Province.

In July 2025 the Vietnamese Embassy in Israel hosted a photography exhibition "Echoes of a people" as part of the activities marking the 32nd anniversary of diplomatic relations.

In January 2026 the Israel and German embassies partnered with the Hanoi College of Arts to host a joint Holocaust Remembrance Day cultural event combining visual arts, music, and historical education for Vietnamese students.

== See also ==
- Palestine–Vietnam relations
- History of the Jews in Vietnam
- International recognition of Israel
- United States–Vietnam relations
