= Palestine–Vietnam relations =

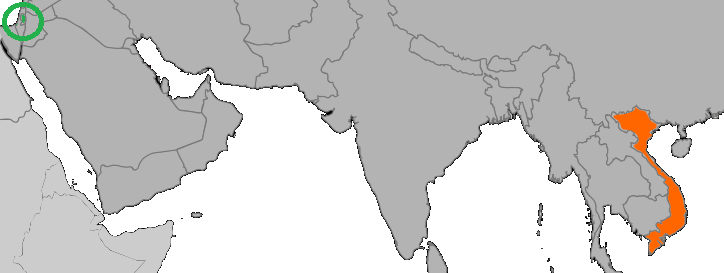

- Palestine: Vietnam

Diplomatic mission
- Palestinian Embassy, Hanoi: Vietnamese Embassy, Cairo, Egypt (accredited)

Relations between Vietnam and the State of Palestine have been strong and very friendly. Vietnam had established very close relations with the Palestine Liberation Organization (PLO) and was one of the first countries to recognize the State of Palestine.

== History ==
During the height of the Vietnam War in 1968, the Democratic Republic of Vietnam or North Vietnam under its President Ho Chi Minh established diplomatic relations with the Palestine Liberation Organization. In 1976 the PLO mission was established in Hanoi and it was later upgraded into an embassy in 1982. During the Sino-Vietnamese War in 1979, the PLO sided with Vietnam and condemned China. After the Palestinian Declaration of Independence, Vietnam recognized Palestine on 19 November 1988 and the Palestinian Leader Yasser Arafat had visited Vietnam more than 10 times. The last one was in August 2001.

== Recent Relations ==
During the 2008–2009 Gaza War, Vietnam condemned "all indiscriminate attacks against civilians," and urged both parties to seek a peaceful solution to the conflict. Vietnam's Deputy Foreign Minister said, "We urged Israel to stop the excessive and disproportionate use of force, end its military operations and immediately withdraw forces from Gaza." Vietnam called on Israel to immediately lift its blockade and allow humanitarian workers into Gaza. After the 31 May 2010 Gaza flotilla raid, Vietnam cancelled the scheduled visit of Israeli President Shimon Peres. During the 2014 Israel–Gaza conflict, Foreign Ministry spokesman Le Hai said: "Vietnam is strongly worried about escalating violence inflicting severe casualties to civilians. We urge the parties concerned to stop firing, resuming the negotiations and supported the efforts of the international community in order to soon bring peace and stability to the region."

On 14 May 2018, when the United States opened its embassy in Jerusalem, Vietnam's Foreign Ministry affirmed that it did not send any representative to the reception.

== Diplomatic representation ==
- Palestine has a resident embassy in Hanoi
- Vietnam is represented to Palestine through its embassy in Cairo.

== See also ==
- Foreign relations of Palestine
- Foreign relations of Vietnam
- Israel–Vietnam relations
