= Deaf Republic: Poems =

Poetry anthology by Ilya Kaminsky

Deaf Republic: Poems is a poetry book by Ilya Kaminsky which was published on June 18, 2019 by Faber and Faber.

== Critical reception and reviews ==
Will Brewbaker of Los Angeles Review of Books wrote "Deaf Republic is a masterfully wrought collection" and Kassy Lee of College of Literature, Science, and the Arts wrote "Kaminsky’s Deaf Republic is both rigorous and profound.".

The book has been also reviewed by Karl Kirchwey of The New York Times, Lauren Camp of World Literature Today, Daniel Moysaenko of Chicago Review, Annik Adey-Babinski of The Kenyon Review, Richard Osler of The Literary Review, and Stav Poleg of Poetry School.

== Awards and finalists ==
=== Best book of the year by ===
- The New York Times
- NPR
- The Washington Post
- The Times Literary Supplement
- Financial Times
- The Guardian
- The Irish Times
- Library Journal
- The Daily Telegraph
- Slate
- Vanity Fair
- Literary Hub
- HuffPost
- New York Public Library

=== Other awards ===
- Anisfield-Wolf Book Award for Poetry
- Los Angeles Times Book Prize for Poetry
- Levis Reading Prize

=== Finalist ===
- PEN/Jean Stein Book Award
- National Book Award for Poetry
