= STM Kargu =

Turkish loitering munition

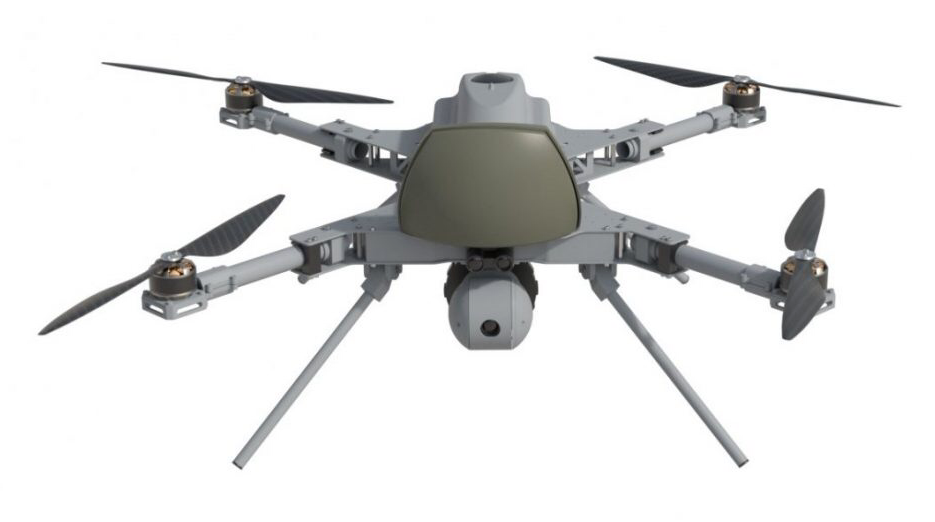

General information
- Type: Loitering munition
- National origin: Turkey
- Manufacturer: STM
- Primary users: Turkish Armed Forces Azerbaijani Armed Forces

History
- Introduction date: 2020
- First flight: 2017

STM Kargu is a small portable quadrotor loitering munition produced in Turkey by STM (Turkish: Savunma Teknolojileri Mühendislik ve Ticaret A.Ş.) that has been designed for asymmetric warfare or counter-insurgency.

== Name ==
In Turkish, Kargu means "mountain observation tower" because these drones were initially designed as an airborne sentry or surveillance tool.

== Design ==
The Kargu can be carried by a single personnel in both autonomous and manual modes. KARGU can be effectively used against static or moving targets through its real-time image processing capabilities and machine learning algorithms embedded on the platform. The system consists of the rotary wing attack drone and ground control unit.

== Capabilities ==
According to STM CEO Murat Ikinci, Kargu has a facial recognition system, suggesting it can seek out specific individuals. Its swarms are too numerous to be tackled by advanced air defense systems and can destroy a large number of targets very rapidly.

The company's YouTube channel features a video of several Kargu 2 drones operating in formation, demonstrating the ability of Kargu 2 to operate in a drone swarm. The capability of this swarm to autonomously identify, select and coordinate attacks on a target has, however, never been demonstrated by STM in reality.

Other capabilities includes:

- Day and night operations
- Autonomous and precise hit
- Different ammunition options
- Tracking moving targets
- Navigation and control algorithms
- Deployable and operable by single person
- In-flight mission abort and emergency self-destruction

== Operational history ==
Kargu was used in Syria and Libya by the Turkish Armed Forces. It was also reportedly used by Azerbaijan during the 2020 Nagorno-Karabakh war, though it hasn't been verified by the Azerbaijani authorities yet.

In 2020 a Kargu 2 Drone hunted down and attacked LNA forces in Libya, according to a report from the UN Security Council’s Panel of Experts on Libya, published in March 2021.

The Kargu 2 was loaded with explosives detected and attacked with its artificial intelligence without command. It was considered the first drone attack in history carried out by the UAVs on their own initiative.

This may have been the first time an autonomous killer robot armed with lethal weaponry attacked human beings. The capability of Kargu 2 to attack targets autonomously has however never been demonstrated by the company.

Commercials demonstrating Kargu 2's capabilities have shown a human operator selecting the targets and engaging the attack mode, while the drone is only responsible to perform the attack dive on the pre-selected target.

== Operators ==
- Azerbaijan
  - Minimum 27
- Turkey
  - 500 operational
- Peru
  - Unknown quantity
    - Anti-personnel and anti-armour systems procured by Diseños Casanave International

=== Possible buyers ===
STM told that they were in discussion with three unnamed foreign countries about export sales of Kargu. STM mentioned "desert, tundra and tropical conditions" suggesting the buyers may be some distance from Turkey.

Foreign Minister Mevlut Cavusoglu spoke at the Japan National Press Club in September 2022 and mentioned that there is willingness to sell Turkish drones, including the Kargu-2, to Japan.

A UN panel says that Government of National Accord affiliated forces have likely received STM Kargu drones, specifically the Kargu-2 model.

== Specifications ==
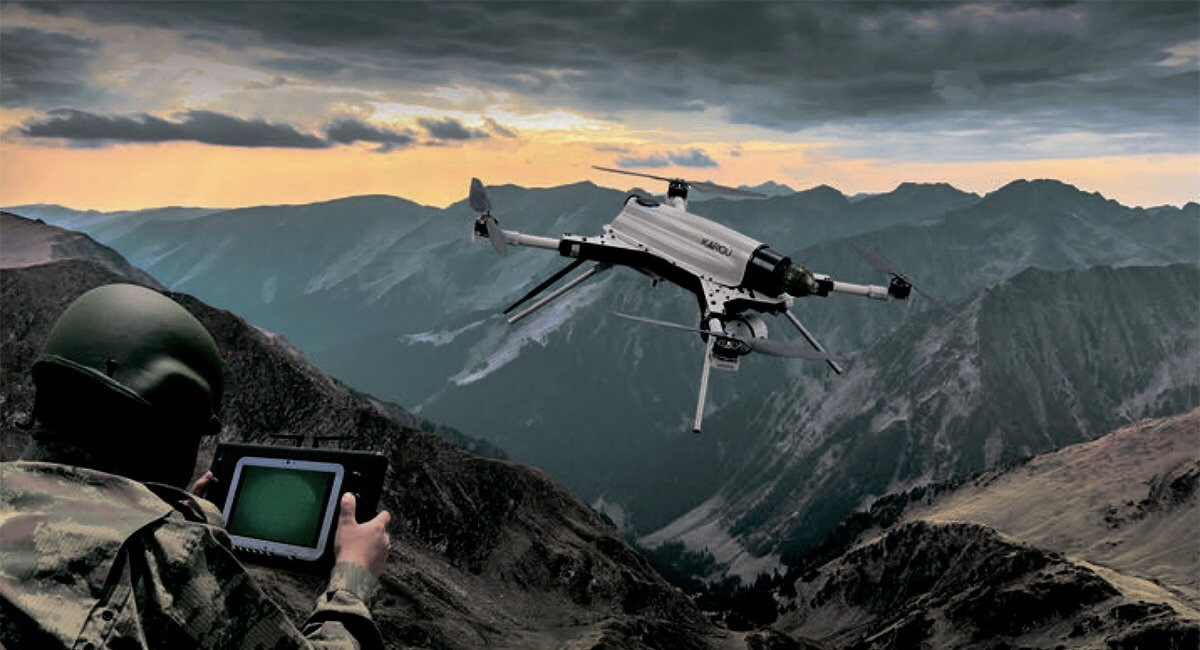

Data from official STM website:

- Crew: 0 on board, 1 in ground station
- Length: 60 cm (2.0 ft)
- Wing Span: 60 cm (2.0 ft)
- Weight: 7,060 g (15.56 lb)

=== Performance ===
- Maximum Speed: 72 kilometres per hour (39 kn)
- Service Ceiling: 500 metres (1,600 ft)
- Operational altitude: 2,800 metres (9,200 ft)
- Endurance: 30 minutes
- Range: 10 kilometres (6.2 mi)

=== Warhead ===
- Different ammunition options with ability to load ammunition prior to use

=== Avionics ===
- Camera with 10x optical zoom
- Artificial Intelligence Machine Learning algorithms
- Target identification and tracking

== See also ==
- IAI Rotem L
- Spike Firefly
