= Tạ Minh Châu =

Vietnamese poet (1949–2024)

Ambassador of Vietnam to Laos
- Preceded by: Nguyễn Huy Quang
- Succeeded by: Nguyễn Mạnh Hùng
- Constituency: Laos
- In office 2009–2012

Ambassador of Vietnam to Poland
- In office 1998–2002
- Preceded by: Vũ Dương Huân
- Succeeded by: Đinh Xuân Lưu

Personal details
- Born: 13 December 1949
- Died: 13 November 2024 (aged 74)
- Party: Communist Party of Vietnam
- Education: Social sciences professor
- Alma mater: University of Warsaw, Polish Academy of Social Sciences
- Occupation: Poet, translator, diplomat
- Awards: Decoration of Honor Meritorious for Polish Culture

Tạ Minh Châu (13 December 1949 – 13 November 2024) is a Vietnamese poet, translator, and diplomat. He was ambassador of Vietnam to Poland between 1998 and 2002, and later to Laos between 2009 and 2012.

== Biography ==
Tạ Minh Châu was born on 13 December 1949 in an educated family in Phú Thọ province. He began writing in 6th grade, and had his first work published on Thiếu niên Tiền phong in 1965. By 1967, he received first prize in a provincial poem contest, and was awarded by Bút Tre.

Châu's spouse and him both had an educational history in Polish People's Republic, with Tạ graduating from the University of Warsaw in 1973, and later defended his thesis at the Polish Academy of Social Sciences between 1986 and 1990. He died on 13 November 2024 in Hà Nội.

== Career ==
Since 1974, he worked at Vietnam's Central Department of Foreign Affairs. Several years later, starting from 1986 and lasting until 1988, he regularly posted notable poems and works from Polish literature on the Tuần báo Văn nghệ.

In 1994 and encouraged by Phạm Tiến Duật, Tạ Minh Châu published the poem collection "Đi ngược hoàng hôn" (Against the Sunset), before being admitted into the Vietnam Writers' Association 2 years later.

After poet Wislawa Szymborska won the 1996 Nobel Prize in Literature, Tạ Minh Châu began translating her works a year later. As a result of his introductions of Szymborska's works to Vietnam, the Polish Government awarded him the Decoration of Honor Meritorious for Polish Culture. When Szymborska heard of this news, she allowed Tạ to translate and publish all of her works into Vietnamese.

Between 1998 and 2002, he was appointed ambassador of Vietnam to Poland. During his term, he co-founded the Viet Nam – Poland Friendship Association. After this appointment, he returned to diplomatic work between 2009 and 2012, as Ambassador to Laos.

== Works ==
- Wild strawberries (translated poems, 1986)
- Poems of Wislawa Szymborska (translation; 1997)
- The crazy children (translation, 1987)
- Ashes and Diamonds (translation, 1988)
- Tears from Heart (translation; 1994)
- Against the Sunset (poem, 1994)
- Collection of poems from Wislawa Szymborska (2014)
- Tied to (Viet-Lao bilingual poem)
- Anchored words in the night (poem, 2001)

== See also ==
- Laos-Vietnam relations
