= Đinh Xuân Lưu =

Vietnamese Ambassador to Israel
- In office 2009–2012
- Preceded by: First ambassador
- Succeeded by: Tạ Duy Chính

Vietnamese Ambassador to Poland
- In office 2002–2006
- Preceded by: Tạ Minh Châu
- Succeeded by: Nguyễn Văn Xương

Personal details
- Born: Vietnam
- Occupation: Ambassador

Đinh Xuân Lưu is a Vietnamese ambassador who served as the country's ambassador to Poland (2002 – 2006). From 2009 Lưu has been Vietnam's first ambassador to Israel. He is married to Truong Phuong Hong.

== Ambassador to Israel ==
Lưu served as the Ambassador to Israel of the Socialist Republic of Vietnam. He presented his credentials to Israeli President Shimon Peres as the first Vietnamese Ambassador to Israel on July 8, 2009. Diplomatic relations had been established between the two countries in 1993. The Vietnamese embassy in Israel, where he is based, is at 4 Weizman Street in Tel Aviv.

In September 2011, Lưu and Vietnamese Ministry of Defence Deputy Minister Truong Quang Khanh led a working delegation from the defense ministry in a visit to Israel.

In September 2012, Lưu said that friendship and cooperation between Israel and Vietnam had its roots in a meeting in 1946 between Democratic Republic of Vietnam Prime Minister and President Ho Chi Minh and David Ben-Gurion. He also said that trade between the two countries had risen to $660 million in the first eight months of 2012. Lưu spoke of cooperation between the two countries in agriculture, water technologies, IT, telecommunication, education, and homeland security.

== See also ==
- Israel–Vietnam relations
