= History of the Jews in Vietnam =

The history of the Jews in Vietnam dates back to the 19th century. Jews are a minor ethno-religious group in Vietnam, consisting of only about 300 people as of 2007. Although Jews have been present in Vietnam and Judaism has been practiced since the late 19th century, most adherents have been, and remain today, expatriates, with few to no native Vietnamese converts. Organized Jewish communal life today centers on Chabad centers in Ho Chi Minh City and Hanoi.

== Nguyen Dynasty and French protectorate ==
=== 19th century ===
The first Jews to visit Vietnam likely arrived during the Nguyễn dynasty and following the French colonization of the country in the latter half of the 19th century. There are a handful of references to Jewish settlement in Saigon sprinkled through the pages of the Jewish Chronicle in the 1860s and 1870s.

The Jewish Encyclopedia mentions a French merchant and ship-owner named Jules Rueff (1854-1907) being active in Indochina in the 1870s, becoming "one of the pioneers of French influence in that country." Per the Encyclopedia of Jewish Knowledge, "in 1872 [Rueff] became one of the pioneers in the development of French Indo-China." He is also credited in other sources to have been both the "originator of the plan for the railroad of Saigon-Mỹ Tho, in Cochinchina, and the founder and general director of the 'Messageries Fluviales de Cochinchine'", which, with the backing of French governmental subsidies, greatly facilitated the spread of French trade in Indo-China by the route of Mekong river. Jules Rueff was still active in regional trade as late as April 1889, when he co-signed a petition to the French government requesting relief on duties being charged on cotton imports from Indochina.

A coastal and river steamship was later (1920) built in France and christened 'Jules Rueff' to recognize his role in the development of the region's maritime activities. This ship was sunk in 1943 during WWII by the US submarine Bowfin.

Between 1883 and 1886, Jewish soldiers and officers fought in the French army in the Tonkin Campaign. One such soldier, from a family of multiple members in the French military was Louis Naquet. Naquet, who eventually achieved the rank of Captain and was killed in action during World War I, received the Medaille du Tonkin for his actions in Tonkin and Annam, becoming chevalier of the 'Ordre Royal du Cambodge.

=== Early 20th century ===
According to the Universal Jewish Encyclopedia, Sylvain Lévi was one of the founders of the École française d'Extrême-Orient (French School of the Far East) in Hanoi. The École française d'Extrême-Orient's website notes that the school was founded in Hanoi in 1902.

The Alliance Israélite Universelle appears to have had some activity in Haiphong during the 1920s.

According to the Universal Jewish Encyclopedia, between 1929 and 1932, the U.S. Consul in Saigon was a diplomat named Henry Samuel Waterman, who was Jewish. In 1930, Waterman reported back to the United States about the growth of communism in Vietnam, but his superiors at the State Department discounted his report, saying that the "French authorities have been stuffing him with a lot of hot air about the communistic menace." It turned out however, that Waterman's reports describing the Cong San were accurate, and referred to the Dang Cong San Viet Nam (Vietnamese Communist Party), directed from Moscow and Canton, and indeed there was a "growing threat to colonial rule in Southeast Asia."

=== World War II and Vichy France ===
As late as 1939, the estimated combined population of the Jewish communities of Haiphong, Hanoi, Saigon and Tourane in French Indochina numbered approximately 1,000 individuals. There were also reportedly eighty Jews in Tonkin during the period of Vichy rule, of which forty-nine were in the military and twenty-seven were in the foreign legion.

In 1940 the antisemitic Vichy-France Law on the status of Jews was implemented in French Indochina (Vietnam, Cambodia, Laos) by its Governor Jean Decoux. In November 1940, Jewish people were limited to certain professions, and in July 1941 Jewish children were not allowed to be more than 2% of public school students. By October 1942, fifteen government employees were dismissed from their positions for being Jewish (among the fifteen was Suzanne Karpelès, the director of the Buddhist Institutes in Phnom Penh and Vientiane), and Jews were "fired from a wide range of professions, from banking to the insurance, advertising, administration and business sectors." One such individual, Leo Lippmann, the former director of the Hanoi tram company, was dismissed from his position even after resigning from his post to assume a lesser position. However, since he had been categorized as a Jew because he had two Jewish grandparents and a Jewish wife, Lipmann divorced and no longer fell under the Jewish Statute. When it was deemed by state officials that the statute would have an adverse effect upon their racial Vichy motives for the region – such as the case of Georges Coedès, an employee at the government sponsored École française d'Extrême-Orient (French School of the Far East), who was deemed useful by the resident superior of Tonkin – an exemption to the discriminatory laws could be made. The anti-Jewish laws were repealed in January 1945.

== Democratic Republic of Vietnam ==
In 1954, with the dissolution of French Indochina, Vietnam achieved independence as a divided state, with a communist north and a capitalist south. The French Premier who negotiated France's pullout from the Indochina region was Pierre Mendès France, who happened to be Jewish. Prior to the French evacuation, the Jewish population in Indochina (which encompassed Vietnam, Laos and Cambodia) was reportedly 1,500, and most of those Jews were said to have left with the French, leaving behind no organized Jewish communal structure. On 25 May 1954 Robert Capa, a photo journalist made famous for providing the first photographs of the Allied landing on Omaha Beach, was killed while on assignment covering the French-Indochina War. The 1956 American Jewish Yearbook listed the Jewish population of French Indochina at 1,500, as noted above, but in its 1957 printing, there is no mention of a Jewish population in the region.

=== Republic of Vietnam ===
In a dispatch dated August 24, 1965, the Jewish Telegraphic Agency reported a native Jewish population of Vietnam at about 150. The same dispatch noted that there was no Jewish community structure and no interest from the native Jewish community to build one.

In 1971, about 12 French Jews still remained in South Vietnam, all in Saigon. During the Vietnam War, temporary Jewish communities were organized throughout South Vietnam, consisting largely of United States military personnel. Approximately 30,000 Jewish-Americans served in the U.S. Armed Forces in Vietnam; amongst them, Colonel Jack H. Jacobs won the Medal of Honor for heroism for his service.

== Socialist Republic of Vietnam ==
Gradually, as the communist government began accepting economic reforms, the number of Jewish visitors and residents in the country increased.

The discovery of the wild saola species in Vietnam in 1993 made note in the Rabbi Jacob Joseph School's Journal of Halacha and Contemporary Society's Fall 1999 issue. Although the "odd, elusive creature...possibly on the verge of extinction" was not being considered for consumption, it was noted as an example of an animal that exhibited both kosher indicia but lacking a "mesorah" – an oral tradition required by many halachic decisors to declare the animal kosher.

In 2005, the U.S. State Department's "International Religious Freedom Report" noted "There were no reported anti-Semitic incidents during the period covered by this report. The country's small Jewish population is comprised almost entirely of expatriates."

In 2006, Chabad opened a center in Ho Chi Minh City, which is considered to be the economic center of Vietnam. A documentary about the Rabbi, Rabbi Menachem Hartman of the Chabad Center was made by Israeli TV Channel 8, and put online by Chabad. The film, (mostly in Hebrew with Russian subtitles) provides a look at the challenges faced by the emissaries upon their arrival, as well as a glimpse of the makeup of the Jewish community that existed upon their arrival. According to the Jewish Telegraphic Agency, the Chabad Center is reportedly used largely by business people and tourists from Israel and the United States, and as of 2007, there were fewer than 100 Do Thai, or Jews, in Hanoi and about 200 in Ho Chi Minh City. According to Hartman, about 10,000 to 15,000 Jewish business people and tourists visit Vietnam each year. In 2021, The Jewish Link described the Ho Chi Minh City center as being led by Hartman's nephew, Rabbi Avrohom Hartman, who had arrived in 2015, and reported that it included a synagogue, a mikveh, a kosher restaurant and minimarket, and a school for Jewish children.

In 2014, Chabad opened a Jewish center in Hanoi, run by Rabbi Levi Laine and his wife Mushky, after local Jews had asked for a permanent Chabad presence; Chabad then estimated that about 100 Jews lived in the city. As of April 2026, Laine was still co-director of the Hanoi Chabad House.

From 2023 to 2026 International Holocaust Remembrance Day ceremonies have been organized in Hanoi conjointly by the Germany Embassy, the Israel Embassy, the Vietnam Peace Committee, the United Nations in Vietnam, and the Hanoi College of Arts, under the message "Never again". The 2023 ceremony was the occasion for the first Holocaust survivor's travel to Vietnam to share her testimony in person (Betty Eppel, 88 years old at the time).

=== Relations with Israel ===
Israel and Vietnam established diplomatic relations on 12 July 1993, and Israel opened a resident embassy in Hanoi in December of that year. In August 2023, Vietnam extended its electronic visa scheme to Israeli citizens; Israel's ambassador said that about 20,000 Israelis had visited Vietnam each year before the COVID-19 pandemic. A bilateral free trade agreement was signed on 25 July 2023 and took effect on 17 November 2024; the Vietnamese government described it as Israel's first such agreement with a Southeast Asian country, and projected that bilateral trade in 2025 would exceed US$3.7 billion. On 5 January 2026, Arkia inaugurated the first nonstop flights between Tel Aviv and Hanoi.

== Vietnamese refugees in Israel ==
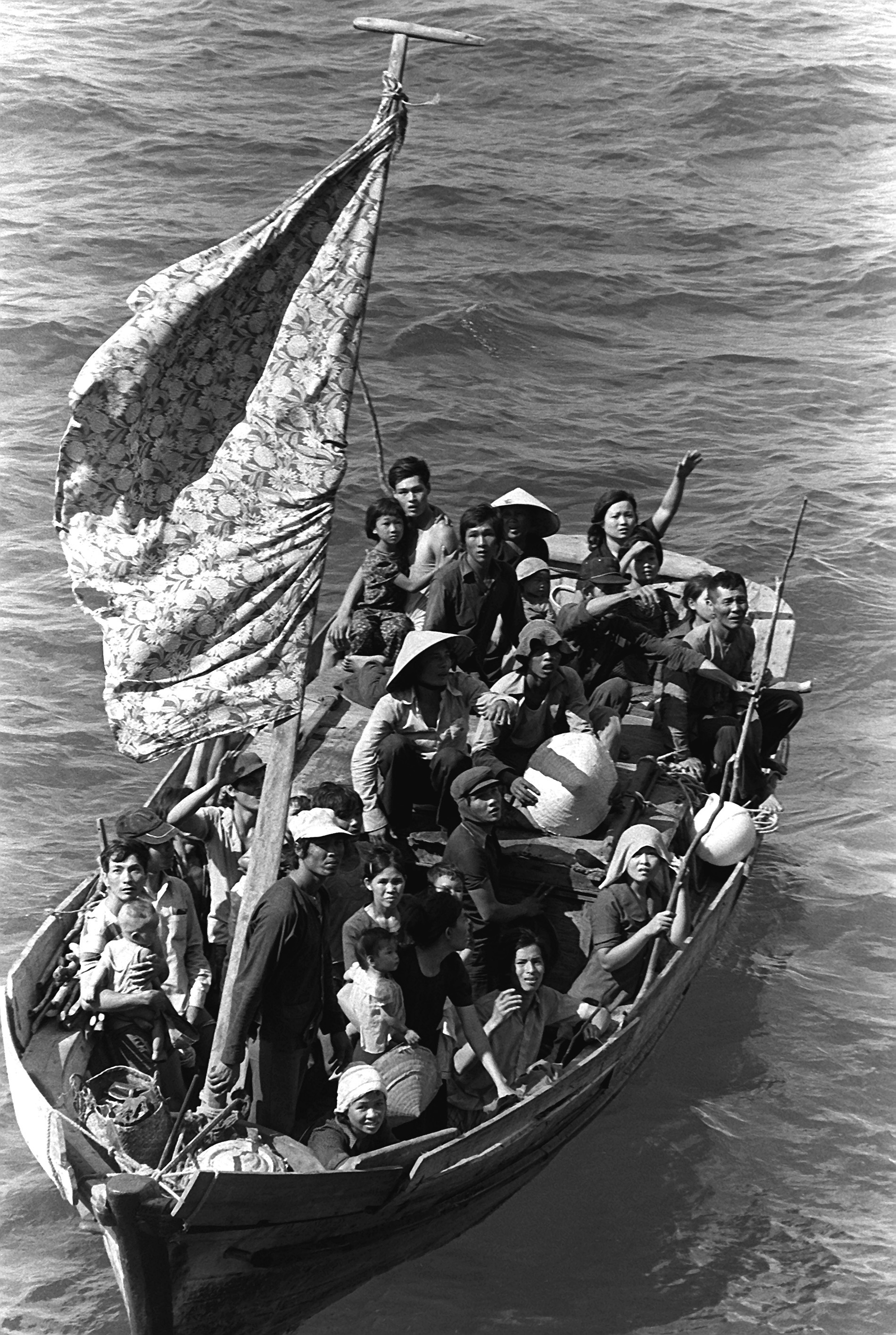
Vietnamese boat people awaiting rescue.

From 1977 to 1979, the Prime Minister of Israel Menachem Begin permitted approximately 360 Vietnamese boat people fleeing the 1975 Communist takeover of Vietnam to enter the State of Israel granting them full Israeli citizenship and rights as well as government-subsidized apartments. The first group, 66 refugees rescued from a fishing boat in the South China Sea by the Israeli cargo ship Yuvali on 10 June 1977, were admitted after Begin approved their resettlement. According to the Vietnamese Embassy in Israel, by 2015 approximately 150 to 200 former Vietnamese refugees and descendants were still in Israel while about half have left Israel mainly for the US and France. Very few have formally converted to Judaism having retained their former religions.

=== Prominent Vietnamese in Israel ===
- Vaan Nguyen (poet and actress), subject of an award-winning documentary The Journey of Vaan Nguyen.
- Sabine Huynh (translator, sociologist and author), fled Vietnam for France in 1976 and has lived in Israel since 2001.
- Dao Wong (banker), headed Bank Hapoalim in Singapore, now lives in Switzerland.

== See also ==
- Israel–Vietnam relations
