= IAI Rotem L =

Israeli loitering munition

Rotem L
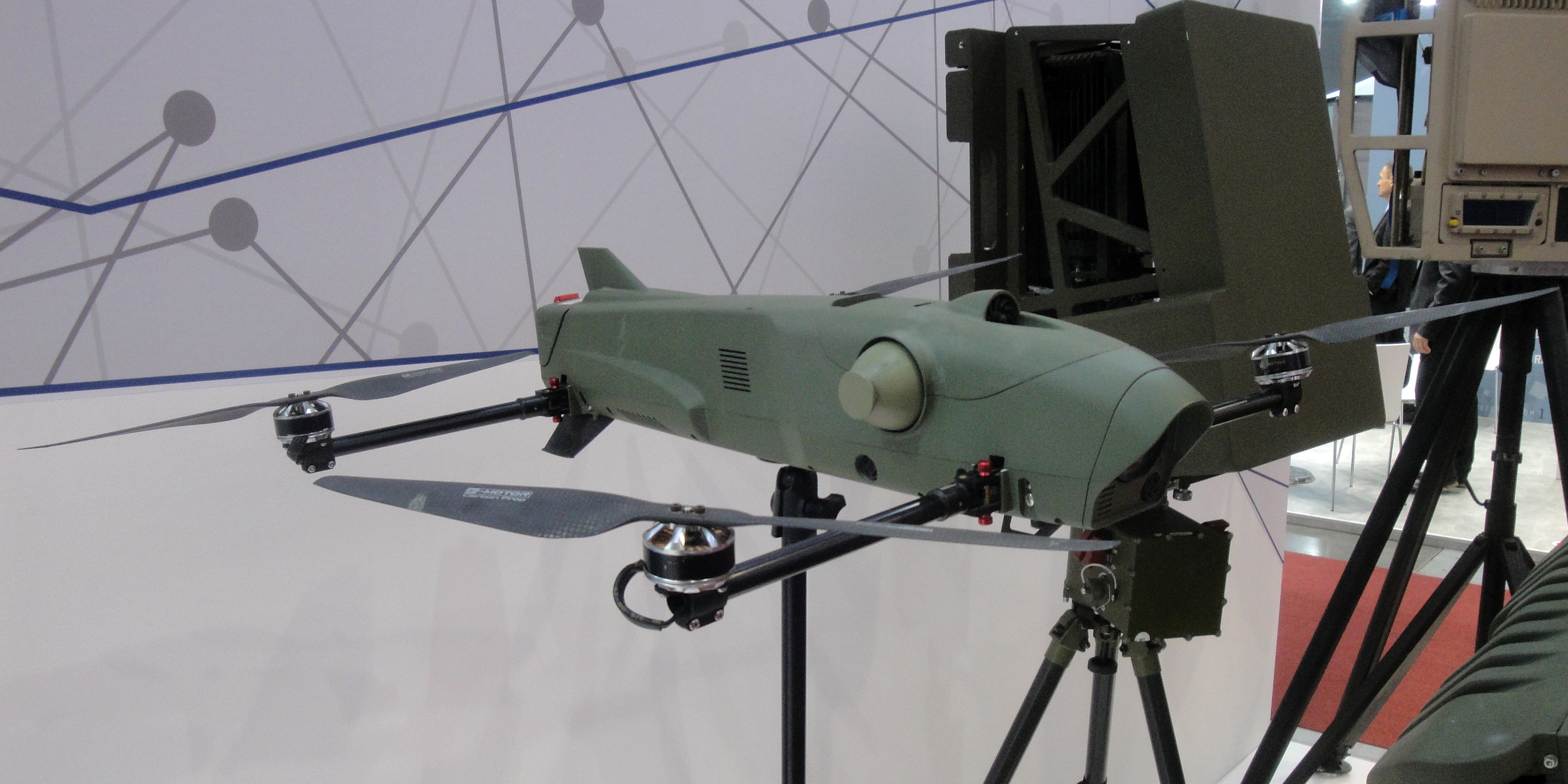
- Type: Loitering munition
- Place of origin: Israel

Service history
- In service: 2016-present
- Used by: Israel Defense Forces

Production history
- Designed: 2016
- Manufacturer: Israel Aircraft Industries
- Produced: 2016-present

Specifications
- Mass: 6.5 kg (14 lb)
- Warhead: 1.2 kg (2.6 lb)
- Engine: Electric motor
- Operational range: 10 km (6.2 mi)
- Flight ceiling: 610 m (2,000 ft)
- Flight altitude: 91–305 m (300–1,000 ft)
- Maximum speed: 36–43 km/h (22–27 mph) (cruise); 90 km/h (56 mph) (terminal)
- Accuracy: <1 meter CEP

The IAI Rotem L or IAI Rotem - Light is a loitering munition developed by the Israel Aerospace Industries.

== Design ==
The Rotem-L is a vertical takeoff and landing (VTOL) quadcopter primarily designed for operations in urban warfare that a single soldier can assemble and deploy in under a minute, then control using a tablet computer. It weighs around 6.5 kg and has a range of 10 km.

The warhead capsule weighs 1.2 kg and holds two M26 or M67 grenades with an arming system that requires airflow for activation, and it can be called back and retrieved if no target is engaged.

The electrically-powered munition is virtually silent at ranges of 200 meters, has a cruising speed of 36–43 km/h (10–12 m/s), and can dive at target at 90 km/h (25 m/s) and achieve accuracy of less than one meter.

The Rotem-L uses a pair of cameras for surveillance and target acquisition and tracking, one in the nose and one under the belly, as well as obstacle avoidance sensors to prevent the air vehicle from colliding with obstacles in urban areas.

With the lethal payload, it has an endurance of 30 minutes, but when fitted with a lighter ISR capsule endurance is extended to 45 minutes. If it lands in a perch to observe, it can wait for up to nine hours.

== Variant ==
=== Rotem Alpha ===
IAI unveiled the Rotem Alpha in September 2023.

The Rotem Alpha is larger weighing 25 kg (55 lb) but is still man-portable, with endurance while airborne of 60 minutes or 24 hours in a perch and stare mode, and an operating range of 40 km (25 mi).

The Rotem Alpha employs a 2.5 kg (5.5 lb) anti-tank warhead with a shrapnel sleeve derived from the LAHAT that can penetrate 600 mm of armor.

In addition to EO/IR cameras, the Rotem Alpha has an acoustic sensor suite that can detect noise from vehicle engines or artillery fire, enabling it to autonomously locate them for engagement.

== See also ==
- STM Kargu
- Spike Firefly
