= Sabine Huynh =

Vietnamese-born French writer and poet

- Born: 1972 (age 53–54); Saigon, South Vietnam
- Occupations: Writer, poet, literary translator, literary critic
- Writing career
- Language: French, English
- Genres: Poetry, fiction, essay
- Notable works: Prendre la mer - 60 sonnets pour les Boat People (2024); Herbyers (2024); Elvis à la radio (2022); Loin du rivage (2022); Parler peau (2019); Dans le tournant/Into the Turning (2019); Avec vous ce jour-là / Lettre au poète Allen Ginsberg (2016); Kvar lo (2016); Tu amarres les vagues (2016); La sirène à la poubelle (2015); En taxi dans Jérusalem (2014); Tel Aviv / ville infirme / corps infini (2014); Les colibris à reculons (2013); La mer et l'enfant (2013)
- Notable awards: Prix européen du jeune talent littéraire francophone Calliope (Calliope award given to promising young Francophone authors, 2015); CoPo Poetry Prize (2017) for Kvar lo; Alain Bosquet Poetry Award for the translation of Deaf Republic by Ilya Kaminsky (2022); Jean-Jacques Rousseau Award (2023) for Elvis à la radio; Des racines et des mots Prize for Exile Literature (2023) for Elvis à la radio

Sabine Huynh (born 1972) is a Vietnamese-born French writer, poet, translator, and literary critic.

== Biography ==
Born in Saigon during the Vietnam War, Huynh grew up in France, and has lived in the United Kingdom, United States, Canada and Israel. She currently lives in Tel Aviv, Israel.

She studied literature written in the English and Spanish languages, education sciences, and French as a foreign language at the University of Lyon, education sciences and pedagogy at Homerton College, Cambridge, linguistics at the Hebrew University of Jerusalem, and sociolinguistics, as a Post-Doctoral Fellow, at the University of Ottawa.

She holds a PhD in Linguistics from the Hebrew University of Jerusalem, where she taught from 2002 to 2008 (in the French department: composition, French grammar and literature, literary theories, narratology). She was a French Lector at the University of Leicester in 1995-96.

Before becoming a full-time writer and literary translator, she worked as a foreign language teacher for many years, in France, the United Kingdom, United States and Israel.

== Literary achievements ==
Huynh writes poetry and prose works (novels, essays, short stories, diaries), mostly in French. Her first literary publications, in English, are from 2000: The Dudley Review, annual literary journal showcasing writing and artwork by Harvard University graduate students.

In 2015, she won the 2015 European Calliope literary prize (awarded to promising young Francophone authors by the Cénacle Européen francophone, which used to be the Association Léopold Sédar-Senghor).

She has translated English and Hebrew into French. She has translated Uri Orlev's poetry and prose, and other writers' and poets', among them Anne Sexton, Gwendolyn Brooks, Seymour Mayne, Dara Barnat, Carla Harryman, Laynie Browne, Karen Alkalay-Gut, Rodger Kamenetz, Ilya Kaminsky, Katie Farris.

Her translation of Ilya Kaminsky's collection Deaf Republic won the 2022 Alain Bosquet Poetry Award.

Her articles and book reviews have been published in various cultural and literary magazines over the years, including The Jerusalem Post, La Nouvelle Quinzaine littéraire, Diacritik.

Her poetry collections include Setting Sail - 60 Sonnets for the Boat People, Herbyers, Loin du rivage, Parler peau, Les colibris à reculons, Kvar lo, which won France's 2017 CoPo Poetry Prize, and Dans le tournant/Into the Turning, a bilingual English-French book (co-author: Amy Hollowell).

Her epistolary essay addressed to poet Allen Ginsberg, whom she met when she was 21, was published in 2016 under the title Avec vous ce jour-là – Lettre au poète Allen Ginsberg (MaelstrÖm reEvolution, Brussels).

Her novels include Elvis à la radio (Maurice Nadeau Editions, 2022), which won the 2023 Jean-Jacques Rousseau Award, and the 2023 "Des racines et des mots" Prize for Exile Literature; and La Mer et l'enfant (Galaade Editions, 2013), which was shortlisted for the 2014 Emmanuel-Roblès Prize and for the 2013 Chambery's First Novel Festival Prize. Literary journalist Alain Nicolas referred to the novel Elvis à la radio in the December 8th, 2022 issue of the French national newspaper L'Humanité as "a text like no other, where the material world imposes its poetic presence and gives this amnesiac autobiography an authority that the personal documentary will never have."

== Published works ==
- Prendre la mer - 60 sonnets pour les Boat People (poetry, éditions Bruno Doucey, 2024.)
- Herbyers (poetry, Backland éditions, 2024)
- Elvis à la radio (novel, éditions Maurice Nadeau, 2022)
- Loin du rivage (poetry, éditions de la Margeride, 2022)
- Parler peau (poetry, with artwork by Philippe Agostini. Éditions Æncrages & Co, coll. Voix de chants, 2019)
- Dans le tournant – Into the Turning (poetry, Christophe Chomant éditeur, 2019)
- Avec vous ce jour-là – Lettre au poète Allen Ginsberg (epistolary essay, MaelstrÖm reEvolution, Brussels, 2016)
- Kvar lo (poetry, with artwork by Caroline François-Rubino. Postface: Philippe Rahmy. Éditions Æncrages & Co, coll. Écri(peind)re, 2016)
- Tu amarres les vagues (poetry, with photographs by Louise Imagine. Preface: Isabelle Pariente-Butterlin. Jacques Flament Éditions, coll. Images & Mots, 2016)
- La Sirène à la poubelle (diary, E-fractions, coll. Fugit XXI, 2015)
- Ville infirme, corps infini (poetry, éditions La Porte, coll. Poésie en voyage, 2014)
- Tel Aviv / ville infirme / corps infini תל אביב: עיר נכה, גוף אין קץ [Tel Aviv: ir nekha, guf ein ketz, artist's book, with artwork by André Jolivet (poetry, Voltije éditions, 2014) : bilingual edition French-Hebrew (tr. : Sabine Huynh and Hillel Halkin)
- Les Colibris à reculons, with artwork by Christine Delbecq (poetry, Voix d'encre, 2013)
- En taxi dans Jérusalem (prose), with photographs by Anne Collongues (publie.net, coll. Horizons, 2014)
- La Mer et l'enfant (novel, Galaade éditions, 2013)
- La Migration des papillons, with Roselyne Sibille (poetry, éditions La Porte, coll. Poésie en voyage, 2013)
- pas d'ici, pas d'ailleurs (poetry anthology, éditions Voix d'encre, 2012. Book published with the help of Région Rhône-Alpes).

=== Translations ===
Sabine Huynh is the author of many translations. A list of translated books can be found on her personal website, on Wikipedia France and on the website of the ATLF, Association of French Literary Translators.
