= Spike Firefly =

L-Spike 1x
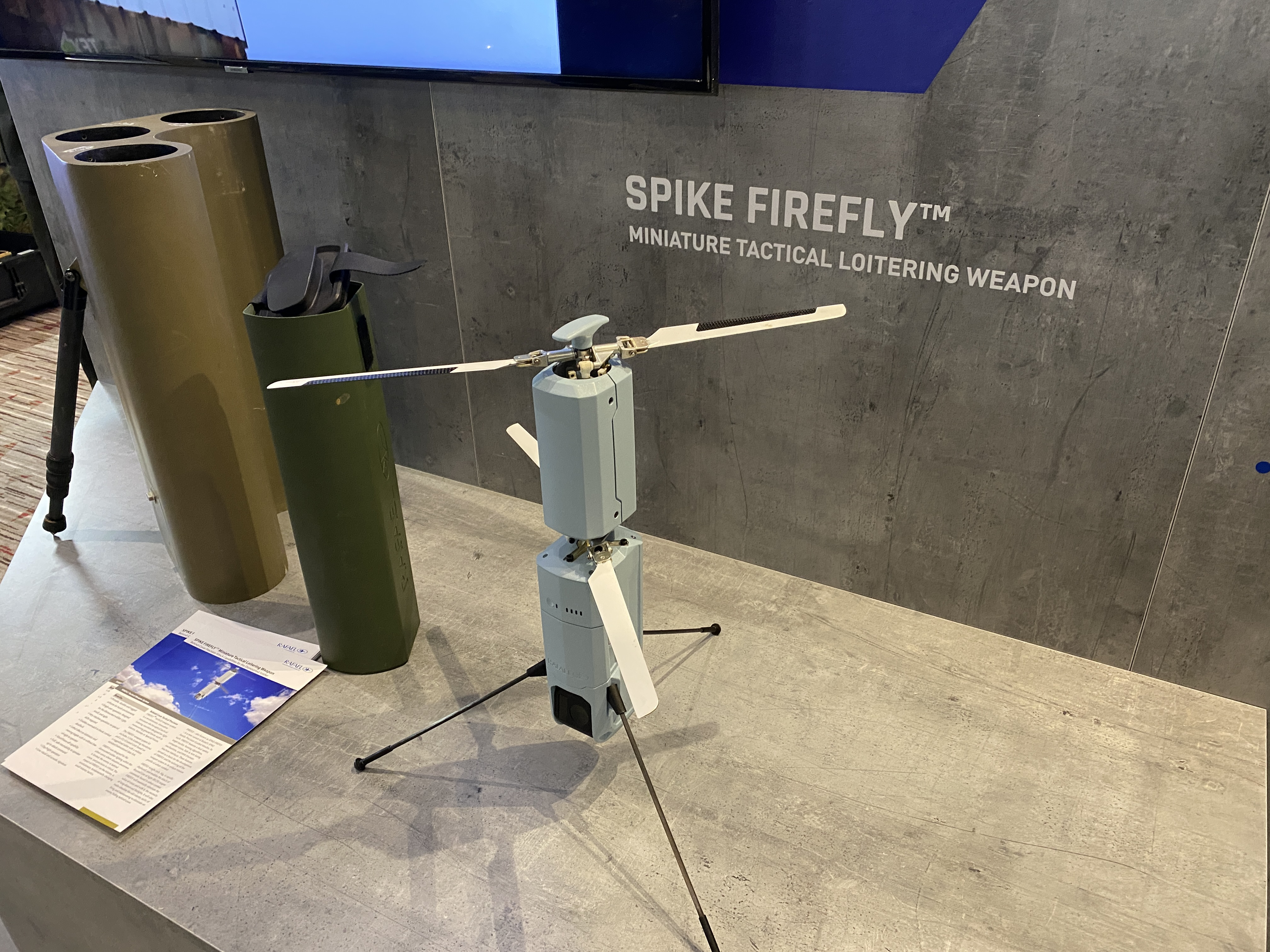
- Type: Loitering munition
- Place of origin: Israel

Service history
- In service: 2020-present
- Used by: Israel Defense Forces
- Wars: Gaza War

Production history
- Designed: 2018
- Manufacturer: Rafael Advanced Defense Systems
- Produced: 2018–present

Specifications
- Mass: 2.2 kg
- Width: 80 mm
- Height: 400 mm
- Warhead: 420 g
- Engine: Electric motor
- Operational range: 5,000 m
- Maximum speed: 60 km/h (maneuvering); 70 km/h (diving)

The L-Spike 1x, formerly the Spike Firefly, is a loitering munition built by Rafael Advanced Defense Systems.

== Design ==
The Spike Firefly was developed to provide infantry forces with the capability to engage enemies behind cover during urban warfare; although it isn't an anti-tank guided missile (ATGM) like the rest of the Spike missile family, it is considered part of it from using components developed for them. A battery powers two electric motors that drive two counter-rotating two-blade rotors allowing for vertical takeoff and landing (VTOL) and hovering with minimal noise. The munition body consists of three sections: a sensor package that includes an uncooled thermal imager and EO day sensor with a proximity sensor that can track and pursue agile targets; the battery that delivers endurance of 15 minutes; and a payload section. The payload can be a 350 g omnidirectional blast fragmentation warhead in a strike mode or another battery doubling endurance to 30 minutes in a reconnaissance mode. It can operate autonomously flying via waypoints, or be controlled by an operator to search and attack targets beyond line of sight. The operator-in-the-loop function allows for a strike to be aborted if needed, and it can return to be reused.

The Spike Firefly body section is 400 mm tall, 80 mm wide, and weighs 3 kg. Control range is 1,500 m in open terrain and 500 m in an urban setting. It can fly at 60 km/h (17 m/s), reach 70 km/h (19 m/s) when diving for an attack, and can operate in wind speeds up to 36 km/h. A Spike Firefly system contains three munitions held in tubes and a 1 kg control unit carried in a backpack by a single operator totaling 15 kg. It is positioned to be operated at company-level. The upgraded L-Spike 1x weighs 2.2 kg, has a 420 g warhead, and has operational range extended to 5,000 m.

== Operational history ==
Rafael unveiled the Spike Firefly in June 2018. In May 2020, the Israel Defense Forces (IDF) announced they were procuring the munition and calling it Maoz in IDF service. It was first used in combat during the July 2023 Jenin incursion. Following the October 7 attacks, the Spike Firefly was used in operations in the Gaza Strip during the Gaza War. In 2025, Rafael renamed an upgraded version of the Spike Firefly to the L-Spike 1x.

== Operators ==
- Israel
- Vietnam: Manufactured domestically

== See also ==
- STM Kargu
- IAI Rotem L
- Uvision Hero-R
- Edge Group QX-1
