= Katie Farris =

American writer and academic

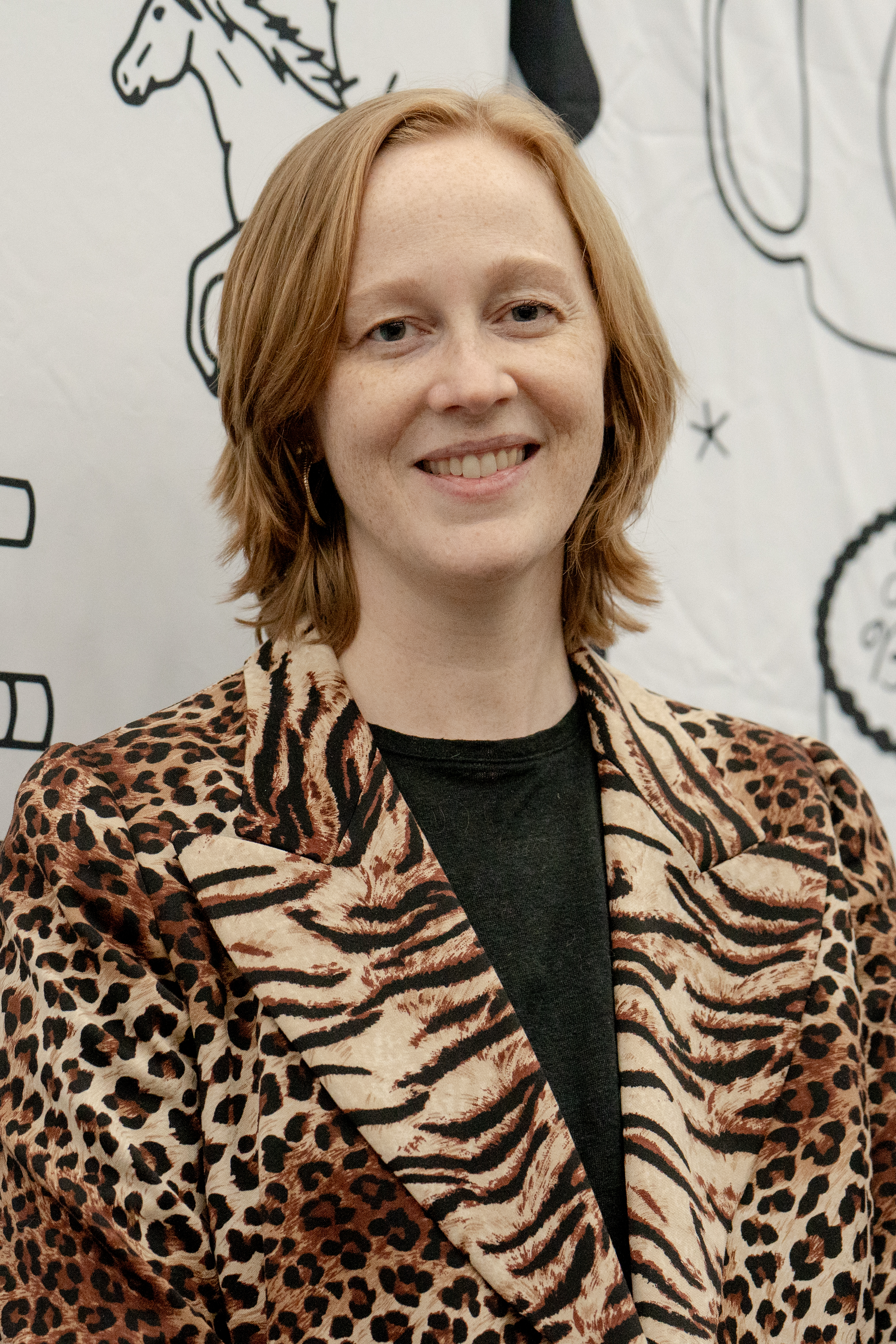
Farris at AWP 2026

Katie Farris (born August 10, 1983) is an American poet, fiction writer, translator, academic and editor. Her memoir in poems, Standing in the Forest of Being Alive (2023), was shortlisted for T. S. Eliot Prize. She is an associate professor of creative writing at Princeton University in New Jersey.

== Life and career ==
Katie Farris has published poetry and prose in publications such as The New York Times, The Nation, The Yale Review,McSweeney's, Granta, The Believer, Poetry, Poetry London, The American Poetry Review, Paris Review and O, The Oprah Magazine.

Farris's memoir in poems Standing in the Forest of Being Alive (Alice James Books) which was shortlisted for the 2023 T. S. Eliot Prize has been called "wondrous" (Publishers Weekly, "brilliant" (Jericho Brown), "saturated with love and intellectual ardor" (World Literature Today), "genius" (Kaveh Akbar), and "perfect" (Harvard Review).

Farris is also the author of boysgirls (Tupelo Press) which was called "truly innovative" (Prague Post ), "a tour de force" (Robert Coover), and "a book with gigantic scope. At some points it reads like the book of Genesis; at others, like a dream-turned-nightmare. From the opening lines the author grabs you by the throat." (Louisville Courier-Journal).

She is also the author of several chapbooks, including A Net to Catch My Body in Its Weaving which was published as the winner of The Beloit Poetry Journal's national competition and was called "luminous" (The Los Angeles Review of Books) and "extraordinary" (Paris Review). Berlin-based press Five Hundred Places published her Thirteen Intimacies. Several of her books have been published in Russian and Ukrainian. Next year, Valparaiso Ediciones in Mexico City will publish a Spanish language edition of Farris' work, niñosniñas, translated by the acclaimed Mexican writer Pura López Colomé.

Farris's translations have been published in The Atlantic Monthly and featured in platforms such as MoMA, praised in The New Yorker, and included in anthologies from Penguin, Graywolf, and Harper Collins.

She is the co-editor and co-translator of several books including Gossip and Metaphysics: Russian Modernist Poems and Prose (Tupelo) as well as Guy Jean's If I Were Born in Prague (Argos Books) and Mourning Ploughs the Winter (Marick Press). Farris won the DJS Translation Award from Poetry East/West for her co-translations in New Cathay: Contemporary Chinese Poetry, 1990–2012 (Tupelo Press). Most recently, she has co-translated and co-edited as A Country Where Everyone Name is Fear by Boris and Ludmila Khersonsky (Lost Horse Press) which was chosen as one of the "Best Books of the Year" by World Literature Today.

She is the recipient of the Pushcart Prize, Chad Walsh Prize from The Beloit Poetry Journal, Anne Halley Poetry Prize from The Massachusetts Review, Flash Fairy Tale Prize from the Fairy Tale Review, and Orison Award in Fiction.

Farris held the Irving Bacheller Chair in Creative Writing at Rollins College. She has also taught at University of California, Berkeley and Brown University, New England College, Georgia Institute of Technology, and for many years in the MFA Program at San Diego State University where she won an Innovation in Teaching Award. Currently, she teaches at Princeton University.

== Selected published works ==
=== Books and chapbooks ===
- Standing in the Forest of Being Alive (Alice James Books, 2023)
- A Net to Catch My Body in Its Weaving (Winner of the Chad Walsh Chapbook Prize, Beloit Poetry Journal, 2021) ISBN 9781732041134
- boysgirls (Tupelo Press, 2018, earlier edition was published by Marick Press) ISBN 9781934851302

=== Translations ===
- The Country Where Everyone's Name Is Fear: Poems of Boris and Ludmila Khersonsky (Lost Horse Press, Idaho, 2022), co-editor and co-translator
- If I Were Born in Prague: Poems of Guy Jean (Argos Books, New Hampshire, 2011), co-translator
- This Lamentable City: Poems of Polina Baskova (Tupelo Press, Vermont 2010), co-translator ISBN 9781932195835
- Traveling Musicians: Selected Poems of Polina Barskova (Yunost Publishers, Moscow, 2006), co-translator

=== Edited books ===
- Gossip and Metaphysics: Russian Modernist Poetry and Prose (Tupelo Press, 2015), co-editor and co-translator

== Critical reception ==
In Paris Review, Maureen N. McLane writes: "...extraordinary poems by Katie Farris—riddling, devastating, peculiarly spritely poems about death, cancer, Emily Dickinson, the limits of mind and body.

Her first full-length collection, Standing in the Forest of Being Alive, is due out from Alice James in 2023. The heart knocks fast with and for this poet, the top of one's head blown off, as Emily Dickinson almost said."

In The Los Angeles Review of Books, Olga Livshin writes: "Katie Farris's latest chapbook, A Net to Catch My Body in Its Weaving, traces her journey with breast cancer, revolving around "the body, bald, cancerous." In the first poem, Farris states her intention to "find, in the midst of hell / what isn't hell," and what she does find is both insightful and heartening. In the darkness of cancer, she discovers light — and the journey to find light, the speaker's efforts, are just as extraordinary as the light itself."

In The Literary Review, Juliana Converse says: "Rather than the sort of tales in which we can point to a specific moral lesson, the stories in boysgirls offer more possibilities than conclusions. And while we sometimes leave these beings on the cusp of metamorphosis, Farris' word selection and lines like incantations reverberate throughout memory and dream. Fans of Matthea Harvey's hybrid mermaids will embrace these characters, and readers of Angela Carter will bask in these mythic inventions/inversions that point to gender identity and sexual agency. With its immersive magic and unforgettable imagery, life surges through this tiny, gorgeous book that rewards and re-rewards with each tumble down its rabbit hole."

In American Book Review, Mary McMyne says: "Farris's language is delicious, maddening and mythic, dreamlike, sarcastic, witty...tales come alive as myths, as dreams."

In Bookslut, Micah McCrary says: "Farris has crafted, molded, sculpted stories that will enter our consciousness as effortlessly as tales of Mother Goose and the Brothers Grimm, because we already know them. And if Barthes had believed that myth "has the pretension of transcending itself into a factual system," Farris's stories have come with no pretense. They are humble. Fluid. Introductory in a manner that professes only innocence—and with this innocence comes belief. And belief, we know, is all that's required for myth, modern or not, to grab us tightly and carry us up into the sun."

In Poetry Flash, Robert Lipton writes: "BOYSGIRLS by Katie Farris, a collection of modern myths or extended prose poems, asks questions about the minutiae of enchantment and its attendant quotidian; the small grows large, the strong, lame and the defenestrated literally take wing. She has constructed a chimerical work, more poetry than prose, a disordered mythology, a book of secrets almost told."

In Hayden's Ferry, Debrah Lechner states: "BOYSGIRLS is a dizzying series of colorful gem-like stories, demon-and-fairy tales that present fabulous monsters that we've known existed all along. In fact, any of us might be one."

== Interviews ==
- Interview with Katie Farris in Kenyon Review
- Interview with Katie Farris in Massachusetts Review
- Interview with Katie Farris in Women's Quarterly Conversation
- Interview with Katie Farris in California Journal of Poetics

== Selected works online ==
- "In the Event of my Death" by Katie Farris in The Nation
- "What Would Root" by Katie Farris in Poetry
- "Standing in the Forest of Being Alive" by Katie Farris in The American Poetry Review
- "When you Walk Over the Earth" by Katie Farris in Ecotone Magazine
- "Wild Honey Is a Smell of Freedom" by Anna Akhmatova, co-translated by Katie Farris in Indiana Review
- "They Printed in the Medical History" by Boris Khersonsky, co-translated by Katie Farris in The Atlantic Monthly
- "The Devil's Face" by Katie Farris in Annalemma Magazine
