= Vinnytsia strikes (2022–present) =

2022 missile attacks on Vinnytsia, Ukraine

- Part of the Russian invasion of Ukraine
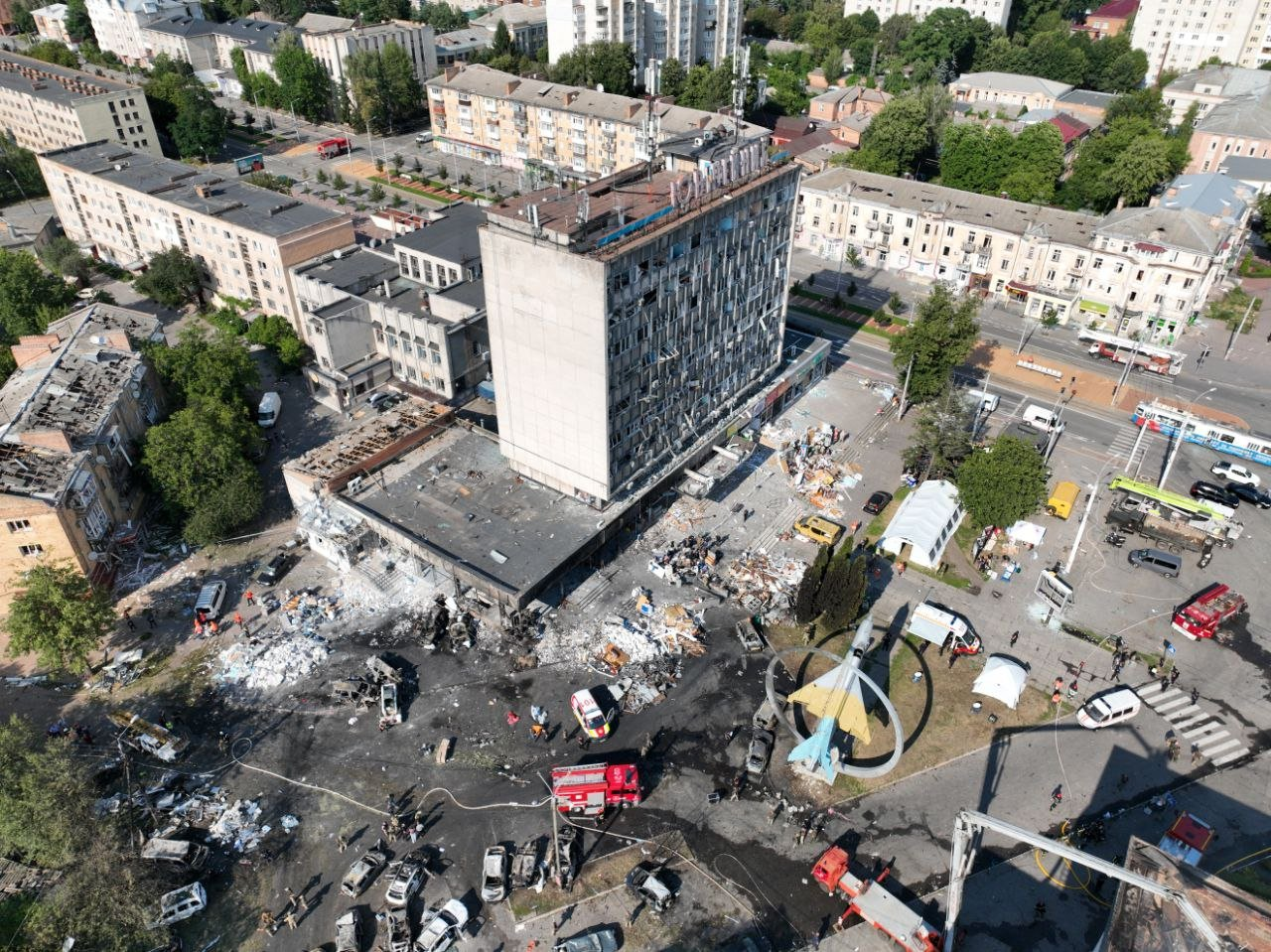
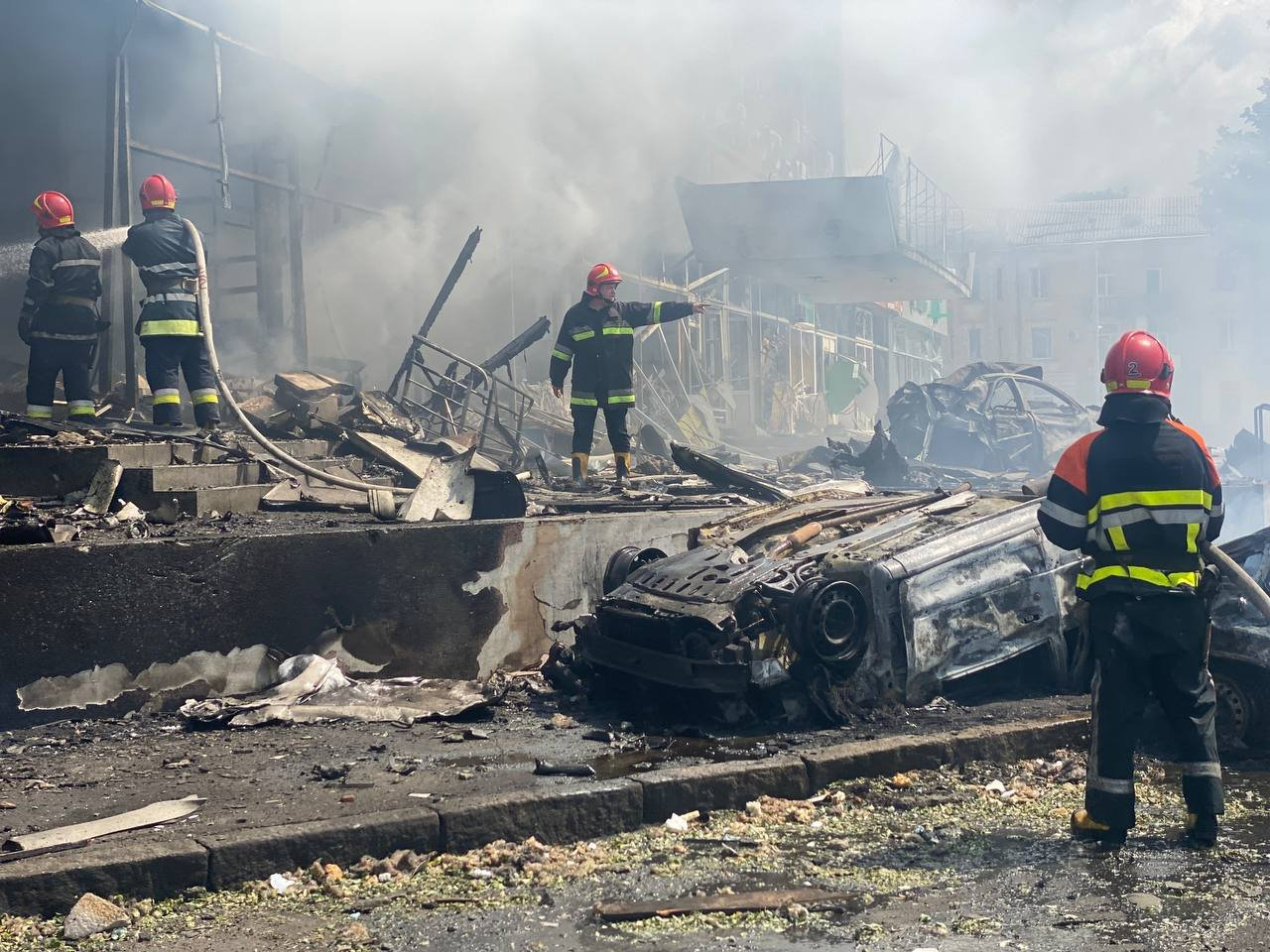
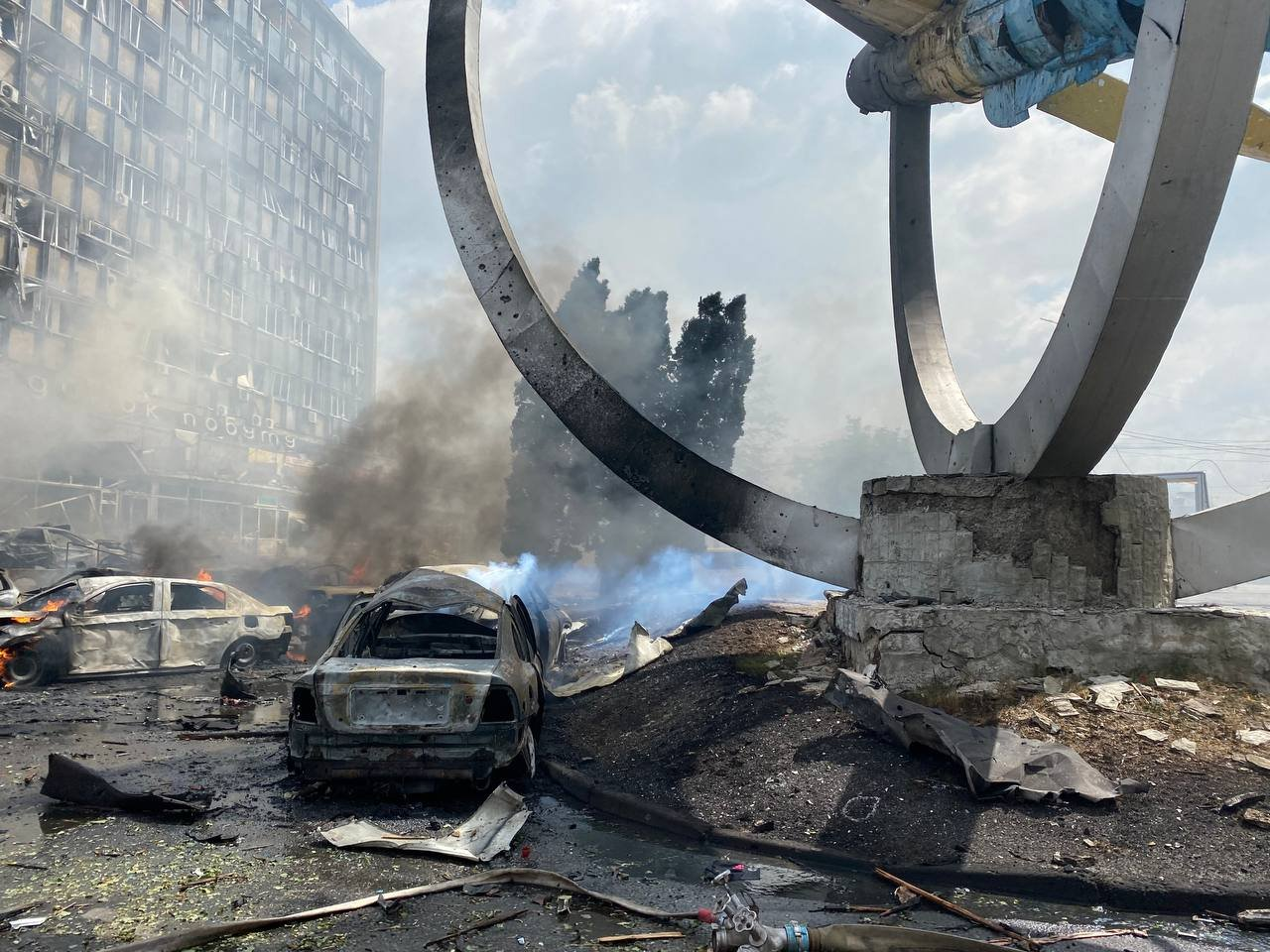
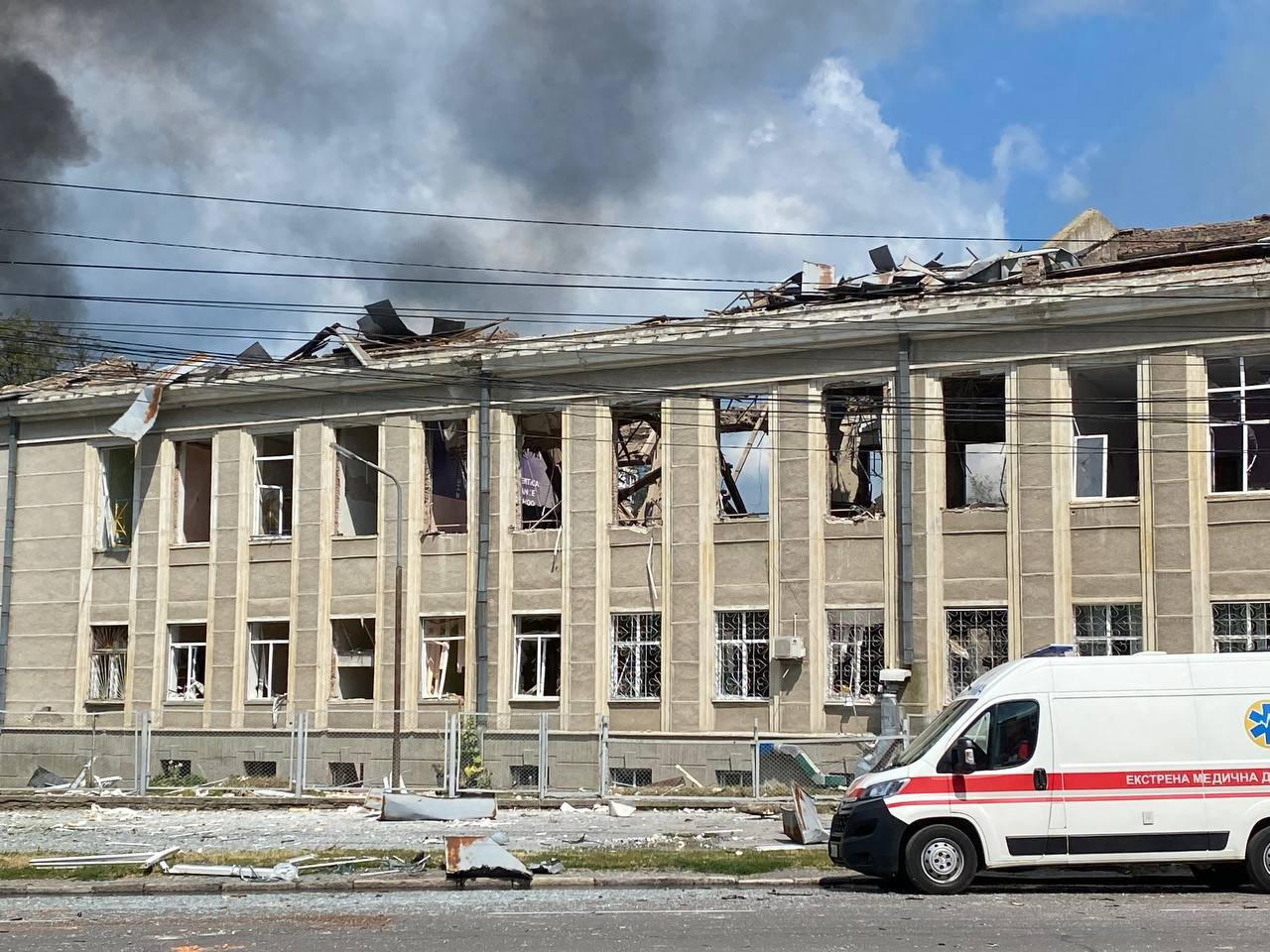
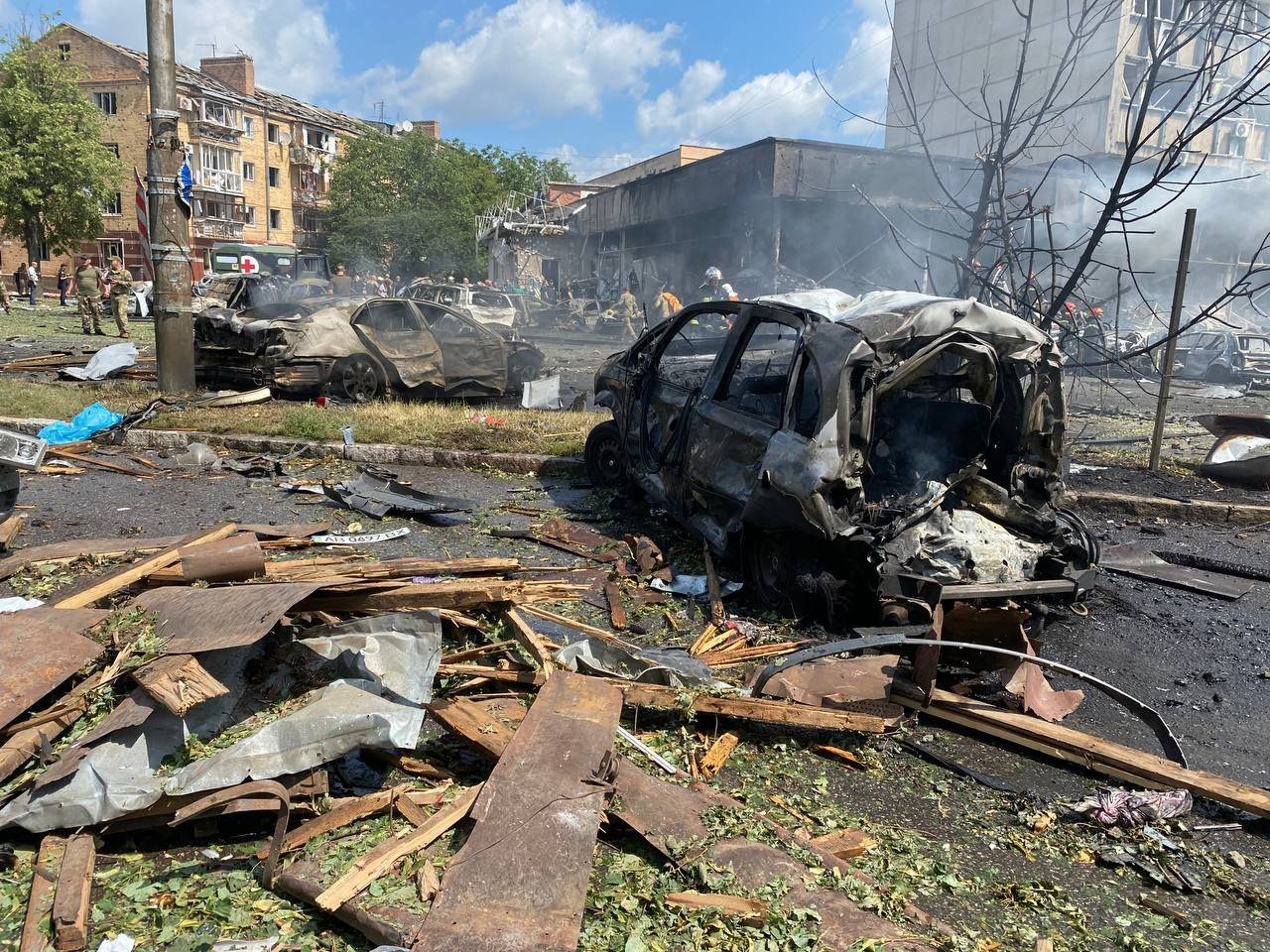
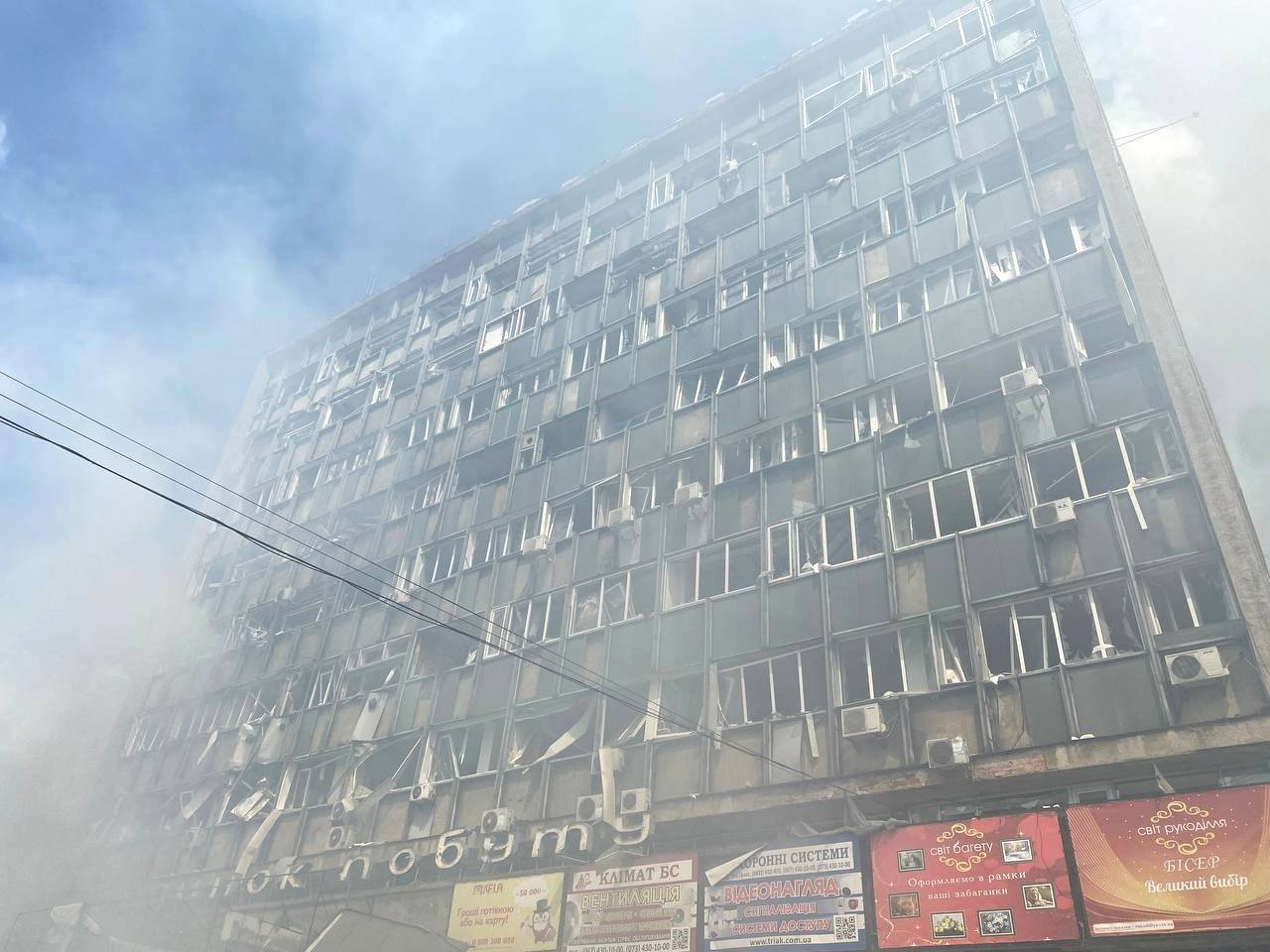
- Location: 49.23962°N 28.49210°E; Vinnytsia International Airport; Vinnytsia TV Mast; National Military Command Centre; City centre of Vinnytsia, Ukraine
- Date: 6 March 2022 — present Major strikes: 6 March 2022 (airport); 16 March 2022 (TV mast); 25 March 2022 (command centre); 14 July 2022 (city centre)
- Attack type: Missile strike from submarines in the Black Sea (city centre)
- Weapon: Cruise missiles 3M-14E Kalibr (city centre)
- Deaths: 10 (airport); 28 (including three children) (city centre)
- Injuries: 6 (airport); 202 (city centre)
- Perpetrator: Black Sea Fleet

The Russian Navy have launched several rocket attacks on Vinnytsia, Ukraine, during the Russian invasion of Ukraine. A Russian attack in July 2022 which killed 28 people including 3 children, received widespread condemnation and has been labeled as a war crime by EU officials.

== March 2022 infrastructure attacks ==
On 6 March 2022, Russian Navy launched rocket strikes against the Havryshivka Vinnytsia International Airport. According to President Volodymyr Zelenskyy, eight rockets launched by Russia destroyed the infrastructure of Vinnytsia airport located in central Ukraine. Satellite imagery showed two buildings ruined, as well as one aircraft destroyed. Ten people were killed in the strike and six injured. There were claims that the missiles were fired from Transnistria, a Russian-backed breakaway state internationally recognized as part of Moldova geographically close to the city. However, Moldovan officials denied this and declared that they had been launched from Russian ships in the Black Sea.

The Vinnytsia TV Mast was hit by Russian rocket fire on 16 March 2022, knocking out the city's broadcasting abilities.

On 25 March 2022, Russian forces launched an airstrike against a Ukrainian Air Force National Military Command Centre located in Vinnytsia, Ukraine. The airstrike consisted of six cruise missiles, that caused significant destruction to the infrastructure.

== July 2022 rocket attack on the city centre ==
At about 10:10 AM on 14 July 2022, an air raid alarm sounded in the city. At approximately 10:42 local residents reported three explosions in the city. Before that, local residents noticed a missile flying over Bershad city and Vinnytsia. According to Ukrainian authorities, the Russian Naval Forces fired five Kalibr cruise missiles from a submarine in the Black Sea. Ukraine claims that two of the missiles were shot down. The missiles hit the House of Officers, a Soviet-era concert hall. According to Ukrainian officials, the missiles also struck civilian buildings, including a medical center, offices, stores and residential buildings. The attacks killed at least 28 people (including three children), and injured at least 202 others. The Ministry of Defense of Russia said that they hit the military officers' club, where allegedly "...a meeting of the command of the Ukrainian Air Force with representatives of foreign arms suppliers was taking place..." According to them, most participants of the meeting were killed. Among the dead were three officers of the Air Force of Ukraine, including Colonels Dmytro Burdiko and Oleg Makarchuk.

One of the victims of the attack was Liza Dmytrieva, a 4-year-old Ukrainian girl who was born with Down syndrome. On the day of the attack, while walking from a speech therapy session with her mother, Liza Dmytrieva was killed in a missile strike in Vinnytsia. Images of her bloodied stroller lying on its side next to her body circulated widely on the Internet. After the missile strike, Liza's mother was hospitalized with injuries and temporarily lost her memory. Liza was buried on 17 July 2022 in the Spaso-Preobrazhensky Cathedral in Vinnytsia. Her mother could not attend the funeral due to her condition.

=== Reactions ===
Local officials pointed out that Kalibr missiles are high-precision, which indicates that the Russians purposefully targeted civilians. The strike has been labeled as a war crime by officials from multiple countries.

Ukrainian president Volodymyr Zelenskyy wrote on his Telegram channel: "Vinnytsia. Missile strikes in the city centre. There are wounded and killed, among them a little child. Every day, Russia destroys the civilian population, kills Ukrainian children, directs rockets at civilian objects. Where there is nothing military. What is this if not an open terrorist attack? Inhuman. Country of killers. A country of terrorists". The strike has been labeled as a war crime by Ukrainian Interior Minister Denys Monastyrsky.

The ambassador of Moldova to Ukraine, Valeriu Chiveri, condemned the attack on Vinnytsia, referring to attacks on civilian targets in Ukrainian cities away from the frontlines as crimes against humanity. He also mentioned the European Union's decision to grant candidate status to both Moldova and Ukraine and talked about the need for both countries to work together.

Days after the 14 July bombing, at the site of four-year-old Liza Dmitrieva's death, an impromptu memorial for her was created to which flowers and children's toys were laid. The video with Liza was shown on 20 July, in the US Congress.

About the July 2022 attack, Margarita Simonyan, editor-in-chief of the Russian state-controlled media, said the building was attacked because it housed "Nazis".

== 2023 strikes ==
On 26 January 2023, the region was hit by Russian missiles, causing no casualties. An air raid siren lasted more than four hours, with fragments of Russian missiles being discovered in the region.

On 24 June, explosions were heard in the region during a missile attack that activated air defenses.

On 6 July, ICTV Fakty reported explosions in Vinnytsia during an air raid that followed a missile alert. On 26 July, Ukraine was attacked using a mix of Kh-101 and Kh-555 air-launched cruise missiles, 36 missiles from Tu-95MS strategic bombers, and four Kh-47 Kinzhal missiles from MiG-31K fighters. Some of the missiles were shot down over the Vinnytsia region, resulting in injuries to five people due to falling fragments.

On 1 September, a Kalibr missile struck the region, injuring three people and damaging property and cars. Another was shot down over the Kirovohrad region by the Ukrainian Air Force. The missiles were reportedly launched from the Black Sea.

== 2024 strikes ==
On 2 January 2024, explosions were reported in the region during a Russian missile attack involving Tu-95MS strategic bombers and MiG-31K aircraft.

On 11 February, Shahed drones were shot down in the region. The response to the attack, which also affected other regions of Ukraine, involved the Ukrainian Air Defence Forces, mobile fire groups of the Ukrainian Air Force, and electronic warfare equipment.

On 14 March, a residential building in the region was struck by a Russian drone. The attacked killed one person and injured four others.

== 2025 strikes ==
A Polish wood-processing factory owned by the Barlinek Group was hit using Shahed drones on 16 July 2025, resulting in injuries. Polish Foreign Minister Radosław Sikorski called the attack "intentional", describing it as being targeted. He further said, "Putin's criminal war is coming closer to our borders."

== Gallery ==
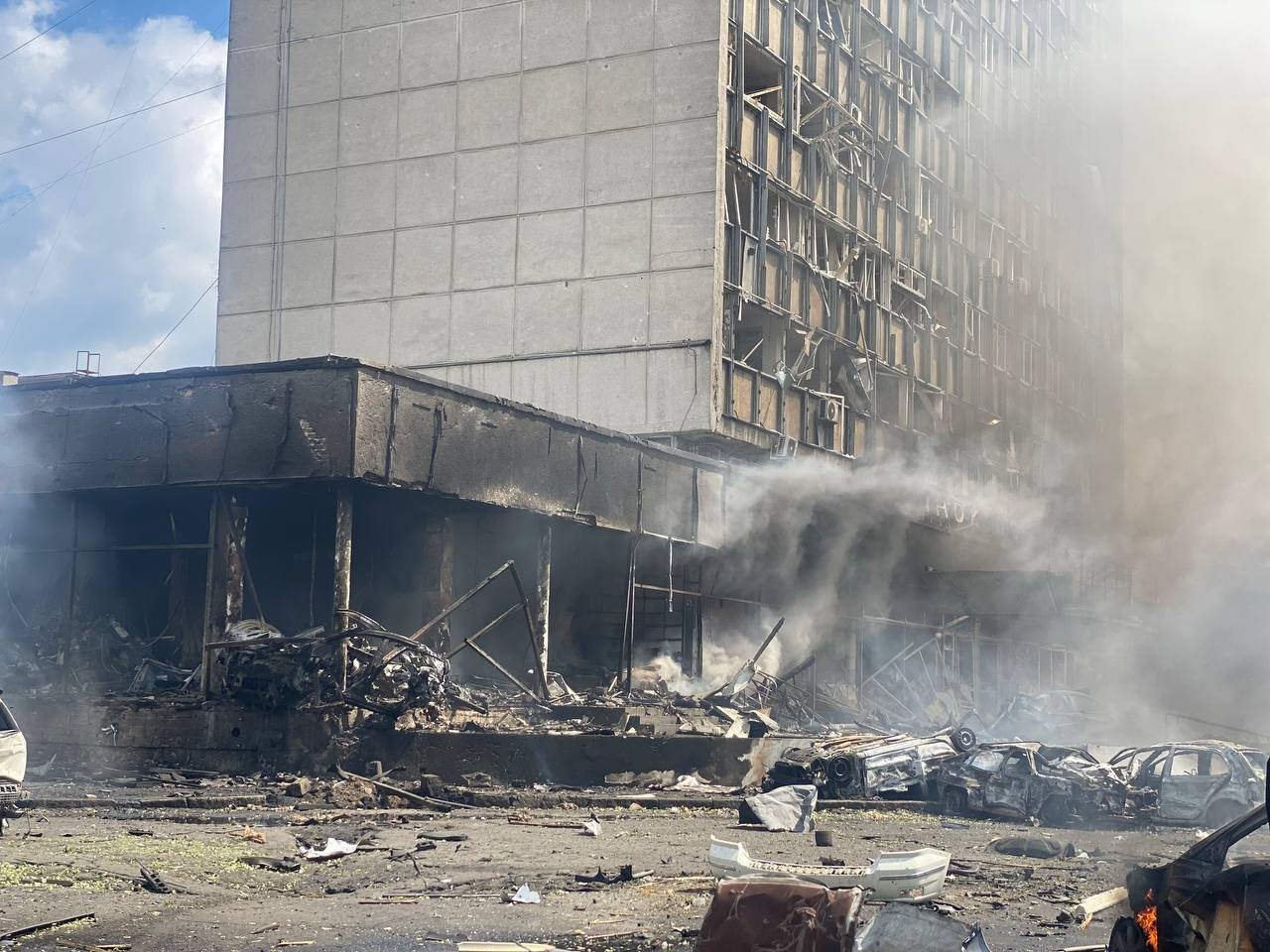
Fire at the site of the explosion

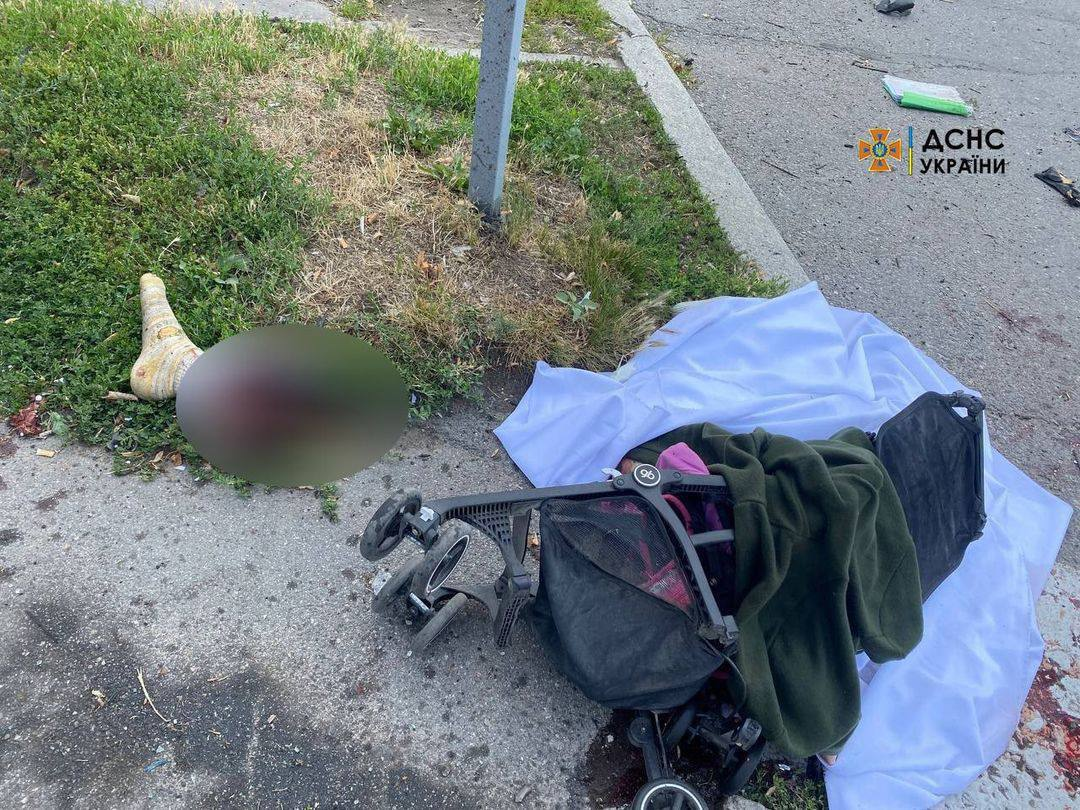
An adult's foot torn off by an explosion next to a baby carriage

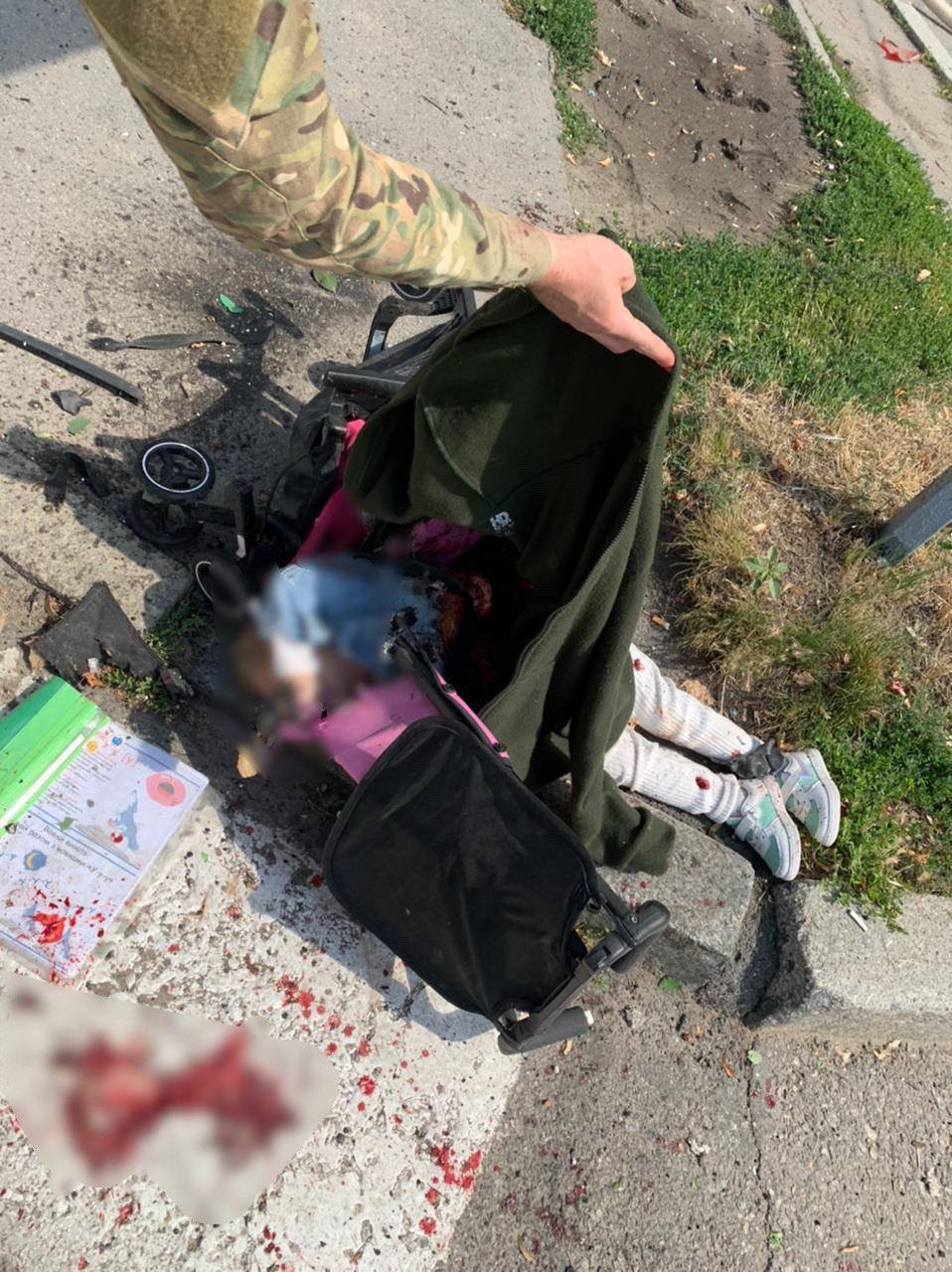
The body of 4-year-old Liza Dmitrieva near a baby carriage

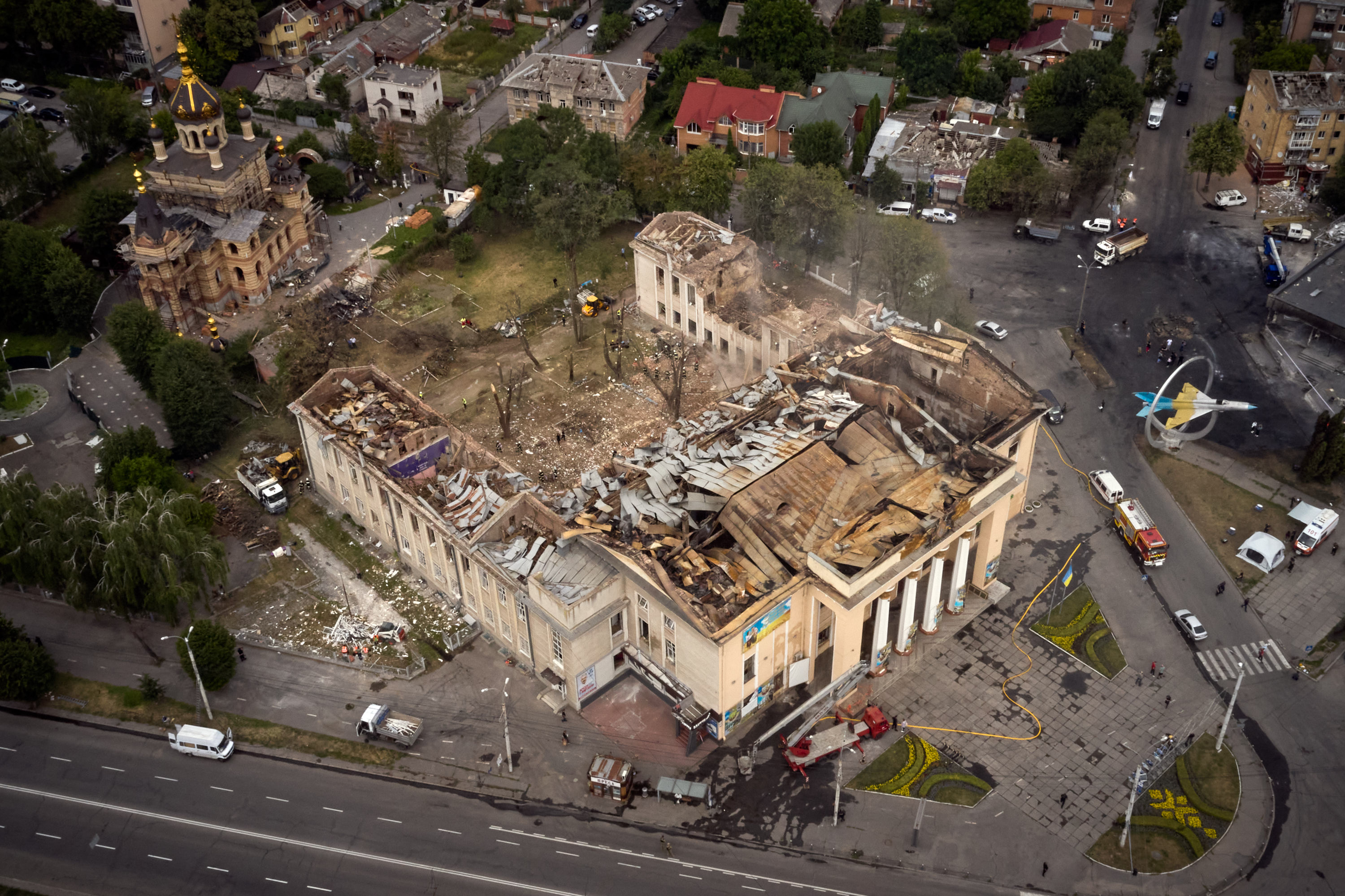
View of the damage to the concert hall ‘Officers' house’

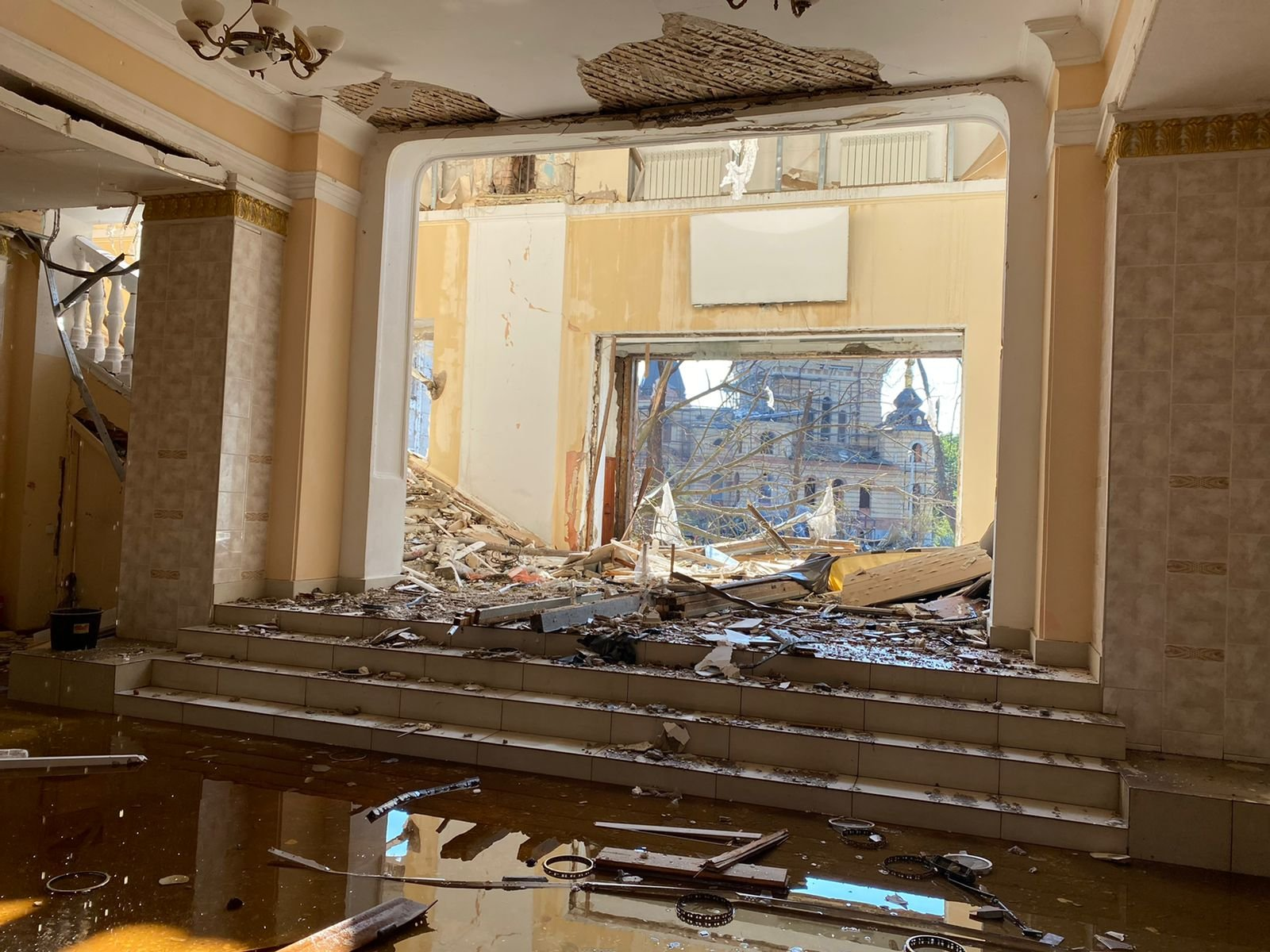
The foyer of the concert hall ‘Officers' house’ after the explosions, littered with pieces of cladding

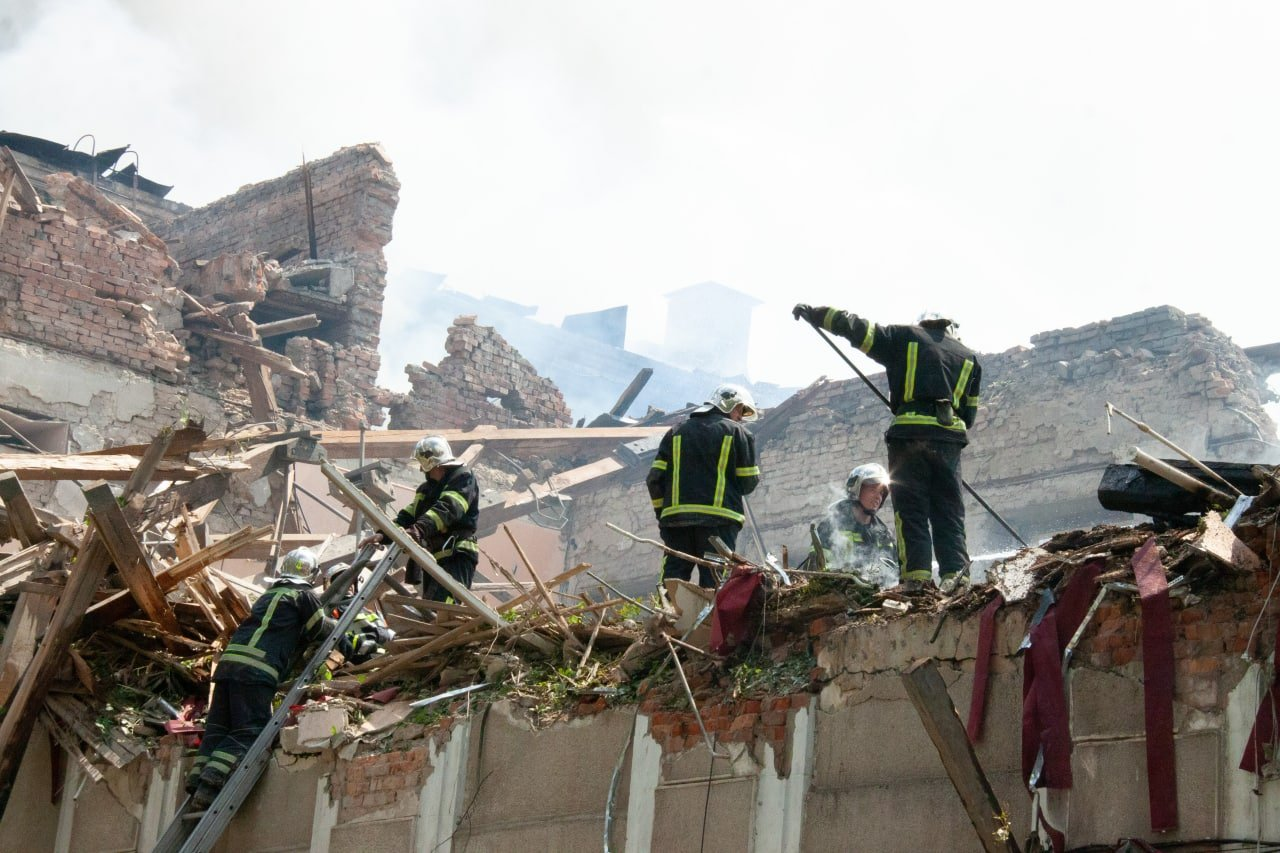
Rescuers are sorting through the rubble of the partially destroyed concert hall ‘Officers' house’

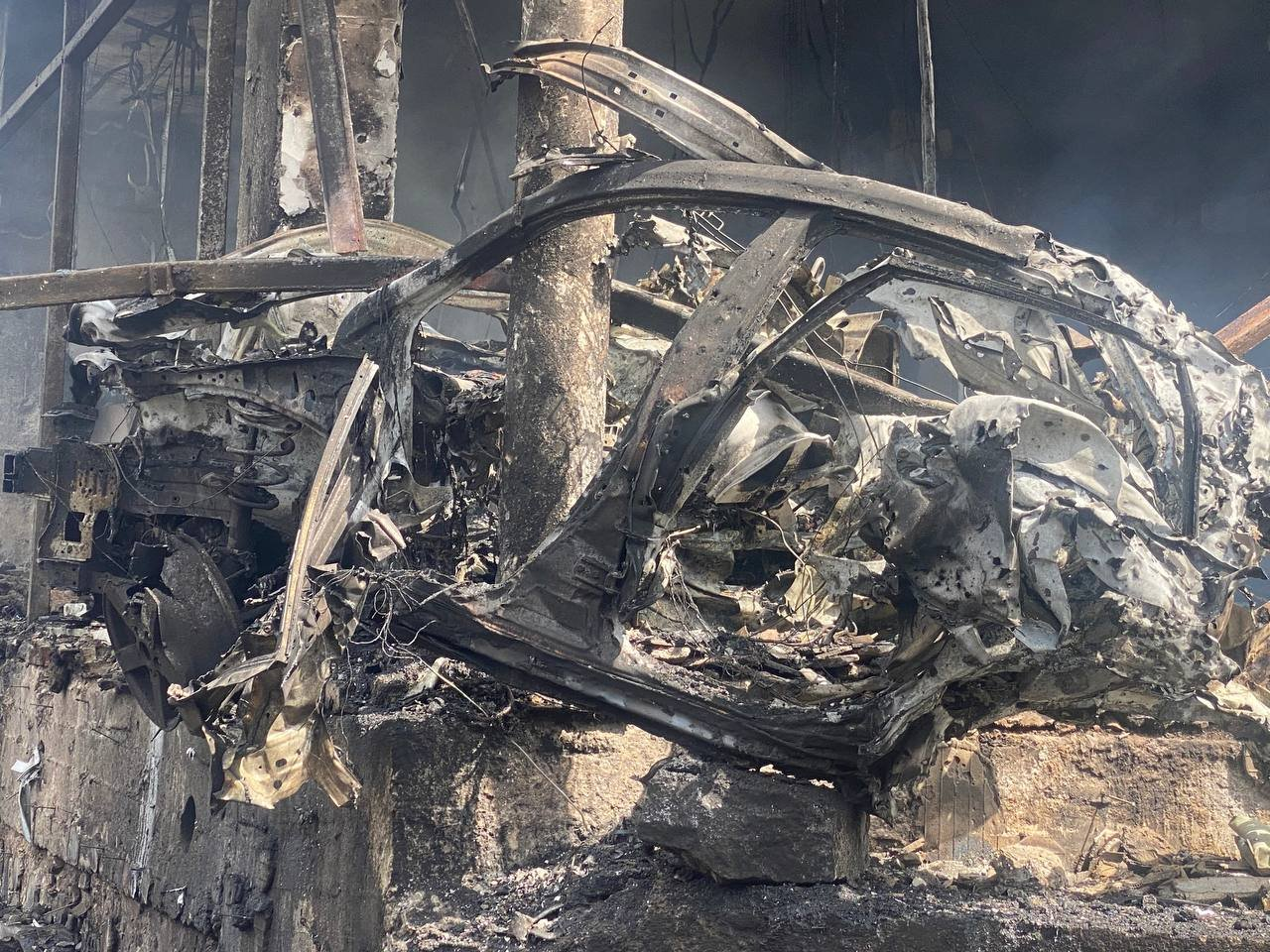
A civilian car thrown by the shock wave in the middle of the premises of a medical facility

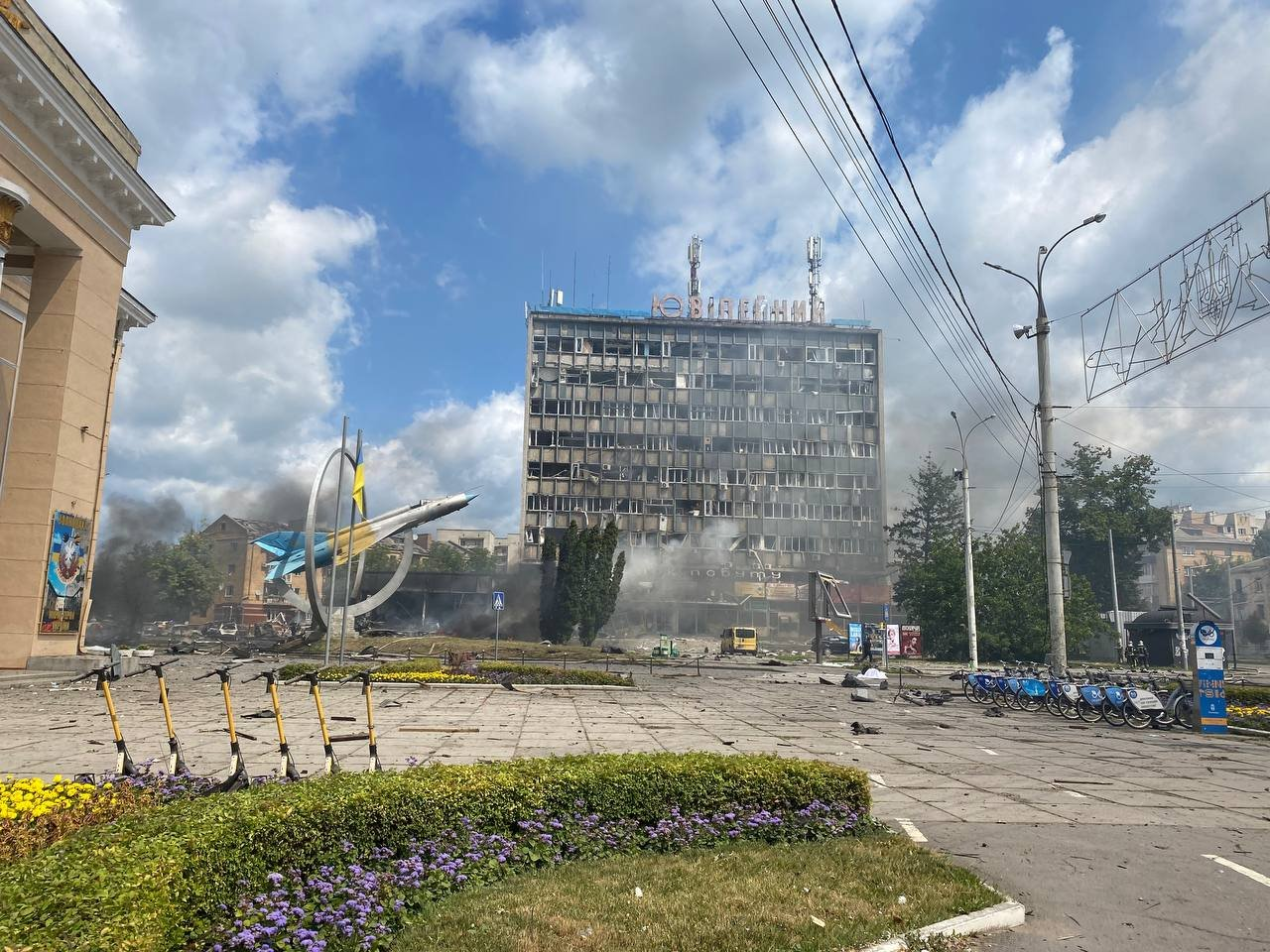
Monument to the Air Force of the Armed Forces of Ukraine on Victory Square in the first minutes after being hit by a cruise missile

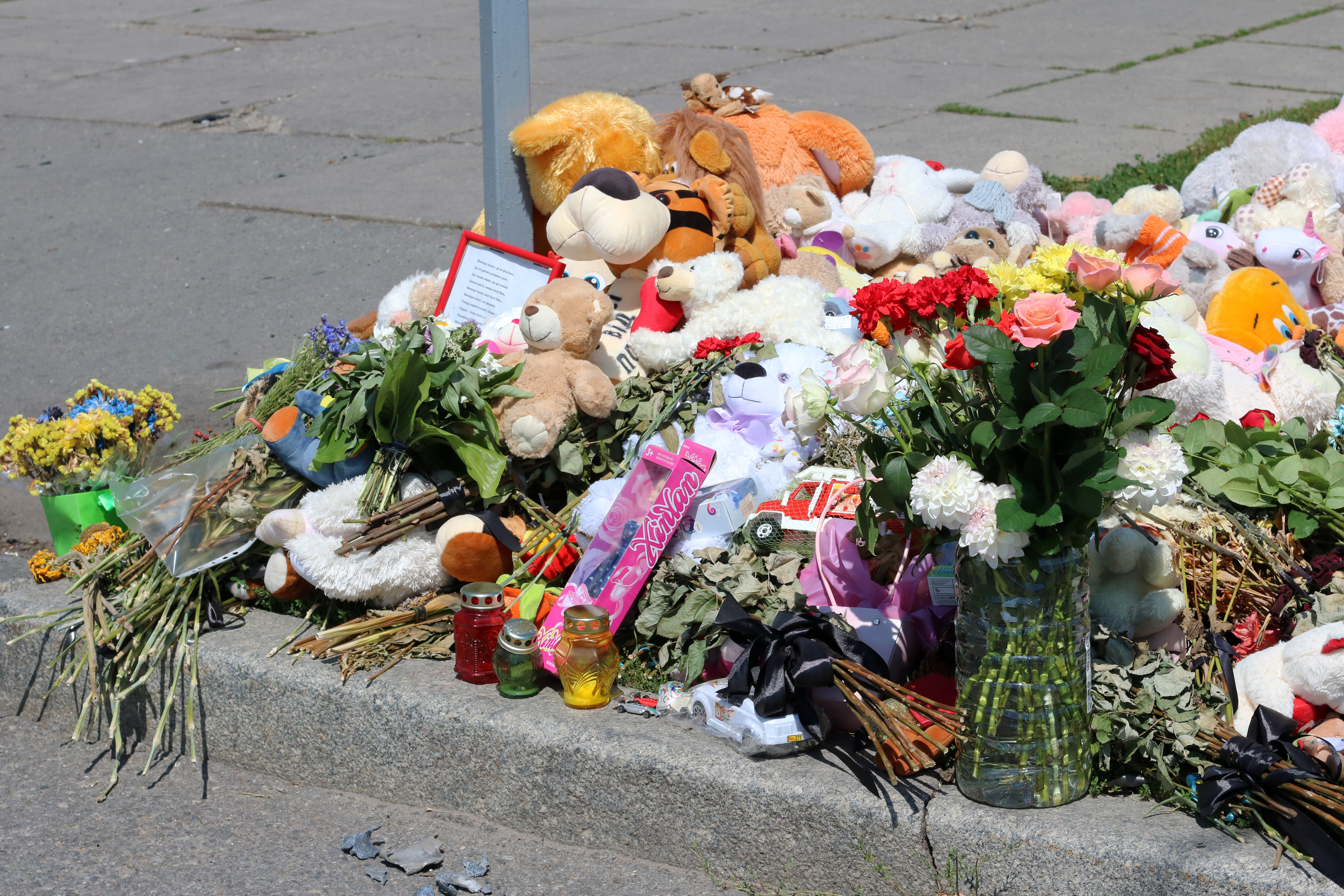
Memorial for Liza Dmitrieva
