= Fiber optic drone =

Uncrewed vehicle guided by an optical fiber

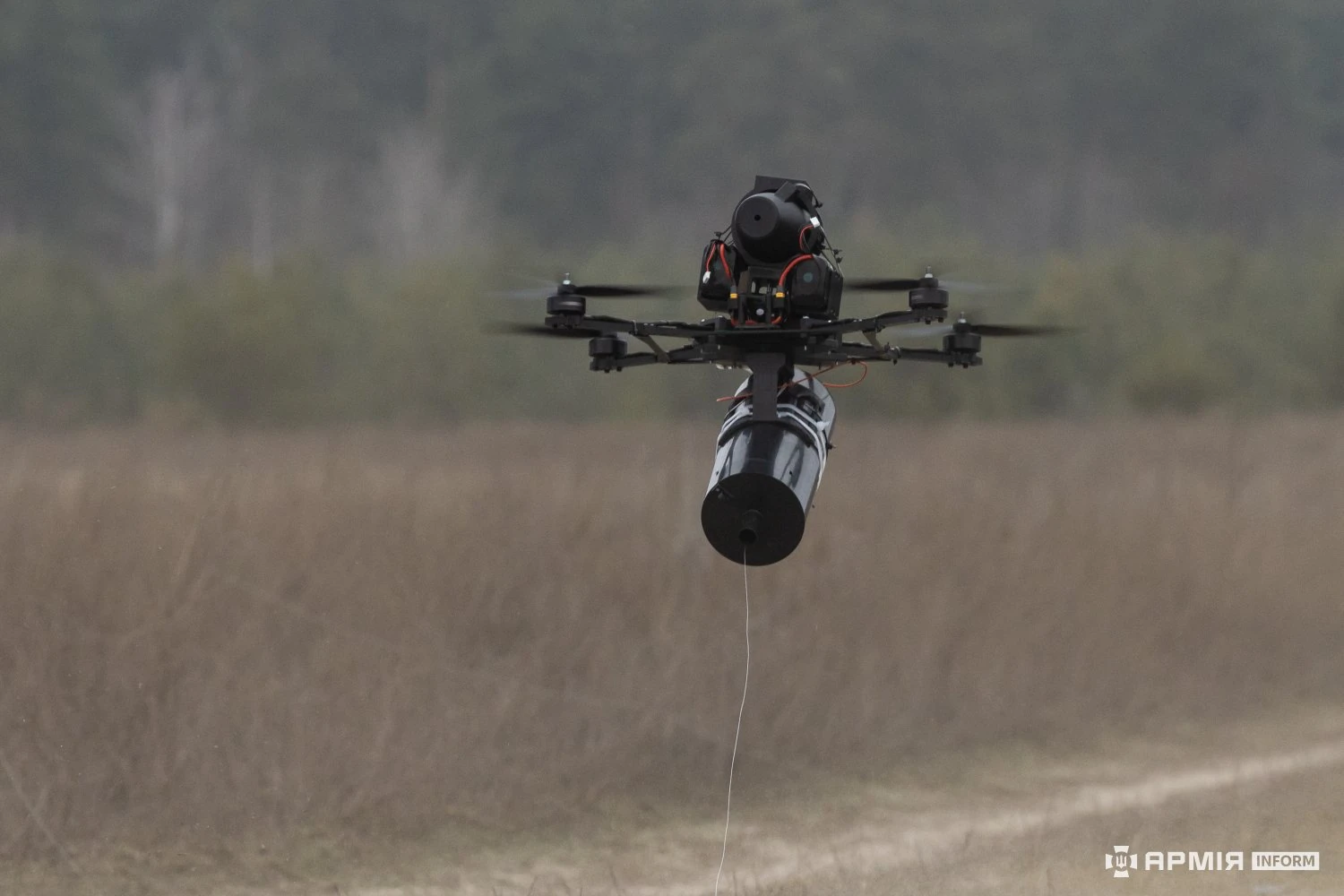
Ukrainian FPV drone unspooling the fiber optic cable.

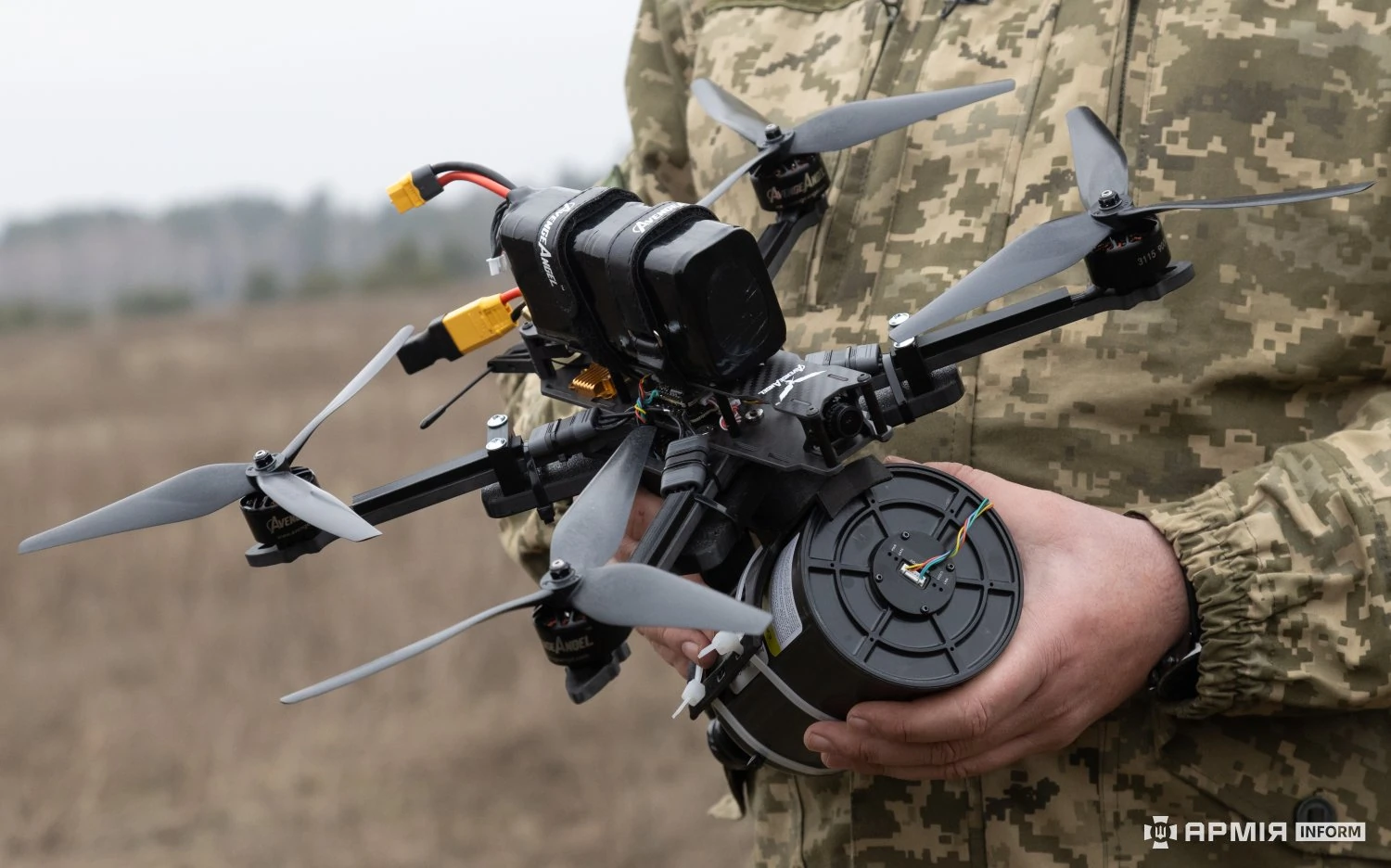
Ukrainian FPV drone with fiber-optic communication channel

A fiber optic drone is an unmanned aerial vehicle (UAV), usually a first-person view (FPV) loitering munition, which uses an optical fiber as its primary guidance and teleoperation link. These drones usually have fiber optic cables between 5 and 20 km (3.1 and 12.4 mi) long, although prototypes with up to 50 km (31 mi) range have been developed. Fiber optic drones are impossible to jam and very difficult to detect, as they have no thermal or radio signature, and are small. They are relatively inexpensive to produce and are constructed from lightweight materials.

== Characteristics ==
An operator controls the drone via ultra-thin fiber optic wire which unspools from the drone as it flies to its target.

Advantages of these drones include immunity to jamming as compared to traditional radio drones, higher data rates from the drone, even from locations where radio contact is poor, with the signal not revealing operator's or drone's location by radio direction finding, and less power required to communicate, so they can be used to idle on the ground for ambushes.

Fiber optic drones are cheap to construct, only costing a few hundred dollars to manufacture ($300-$400 per The Guardian), and can be assembled from components produced via 3D printing and sourced from commercially available electronics. Once equipped with an explosive payload such as a grenade, they can be used in attacks against systems that are many times more expensive than themselves. Operators can manually and precisely steer the drones using uncompressed video footage sent through the fiber optic cables from 4K resolution first person view (FPV) cameras on the drones. While small drones are limited in the damage that they can individually inflict, many drones deployed at once can overwhelm defense systems.

Disadvantages include reduced range, payload and maneuverability compared to wireless drones, and the fiber-optic cord can get tangled or even broken off. These drones are very vulnerable to turbulent weather conditions owing to their lightweight build.

== History ==
In the early 2000’s, US military research agency DARPA developed an idea for a loitering munition controlled by fiber-optic cable under the Close Combat Lethal Recon program, but it was never fielded.

During the Russo-Ukrainian war both Ukraine and Russia rely on electronic warfare to defeat radio-controlled FPV drones. Jammers are used on trenches and vehicles. Pocket-size jammers for soldiers were also developed. Fiber optic FPV drones were first fielded by Russia in the spring of 2024 and by Ukraine soon after. Maximum strike ranges have increased over time, with Russian fiber optic drones hitting areas of Kramatorsk more than 19 kilometres behind the front lines in October 2025.

As part of the 2026 Lebanon war, and inspired by their use in Ukraine, Lebanese militant group Hezbollah are using FPV fiber optic drones to target Israeli military and civilian contractors. Fiber optic drone attacks have killed Israeli soldiers and penetrated expensive defense systems, such as the Trophy ATS system installed on Merkava tanks, as well as the multi-billion dollar Iron Dome, posing serious challenge to Israeli military leaders. An Israeli military source stated, "Beyond physical barriers like nets, there is little that can be done ... It’s a low-tech system adapted for asymmetric warfare." Hezbollah have released propaganda videos documenting their use of fiber optic drones against Israeli targets.

In May 2026, the IDF stated that Hamas is operating fiber optic drones in Gaza, similar to the ones being used by Hezbollah.

== Countermeasures ==
To counter fiber-optic drones, as of 2025, Ukrainian soldiers deploy lines of stretched barbed wire, with a battery-driven motor that makes the barbed wire rotate around its axis. This has the effect of entangling and breaking the thin fiber-optic wire laid on the ground by fiber-optic drones along their flight path.

Israeli forces have also deployed physical barriers and netting to entrap and tangle drones. Drone cables are cut and drones are shot at when seen. As of June 2026, various means of detection and interception of fiber optic drones are being considered and tested, such as acoustic and optical detection systems, lasers and other technology to blind drones, and automatic firing systems, among others. Israel has sought Ukrainian support in defending against drone attacks.

== Environmental concerns ==
The long trails of fiber optic cable left behind the drones on the battlefield may be a significant source of plastic pollution because most of the cables are made from synthetic polymers such as poly(methyl methacrylate) and fluoropolymers.

== See also ==
- Wire-guided missile
- Ushkuynik KVN
