= Ushkuynik KVN =

Prince Vandal of Novgorod
- Type: Fiber optic FPV loitering munition
- Place of origin: Russia

Service history
- In service: 2024-present
- Used by: Russian Armed Forces

Production history
- Manufacturer: Ushkuynik Scientific and Production Center
- Produced: 2024-present

The Ushkuynik Prince Vandal of Novgorod (Russian: Князь Вандал Новгородский), commonly referred to as KVN, is a fiber optic FPV loitering munition developed by the Ushkuynik Scientific and Production Center for the Russian Armed Forces. The drone was designed around the concept of a spooled fiber optic cable, ensuring high quality video transmission, while being immune from signal jamming methods of deterring traditional radio controlled drones.

== Operational history ==
=== Kursk offensive ===
The KVN saw widespread use with the Russian Armed Forces during the Kursk campaign.

== Operators ==
=== Current operators ===
- Russia

== See also ==
- ZALA Lancet – (Russia)
- Baba Yaga – (Ukraine)
