= 305th Electronic Warfare Regiment =

- 305-й окремий батальйон радіоелектронної боротьби
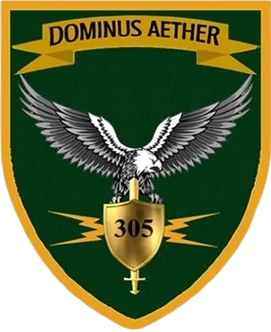
- Insignia
- Active: 2013-present
- Country: Ukraine
- Branch: Ukrainian Ground Forces
- Type: Regiment
- Role: Electronic Warfare
- Garrison/HQ: Kostopil
- Engagements: Russo-Ukrainian War

The 305th Electronic Warfare Regiment (MUN A0532) is a regiment level unit of the Armed Forces of Ukraine, concerned with electronic warfare. It is headquartered in Kostopil and has seen action during both the War in Donbass and the Russian invasion of Ukraine.

== History ==
It saw action on the frontlines during the War in Donbass, being deployed to eastern Ukraine against separatist forces as a Company from May 2020 to August 2021.

Following the Russian invasion of Ukraine, it saw combat. In February 2023, it received 1,490,000 hyrvnias in financial assistance. On 17 April 2023, two soldiers of the battalion (Kornichuk Nazar Ihorovych and Marchuk Ivan Volodymyrovych) were killed in action in Vysokopillia. In 2024, it was officially established as a separate battalion before being expanded to a regiment in 2025. On 20 January 2025, a soldier of the Regiment (Yaremenko Ihor Andriovych) was killed in action.

== Structure ==
Its structure is as follows:

- Headquarters
- 1st Electronic Warfare Company
- 2nd Electronic Warfare Company
- 3rd Electronic Warfare Company
- Technical support and Maintenance Departments
- Electronic Warfare reconnaissance Group
- Logistics

== Equipment ==
- Pulsar AXION XM30F
