= Ukraine and electronic warfare =

Ukrainian war technology during Russo-Ukrainian war

Electronic warfare (EW) is a technology that interferes with radio communications between the operator and all enemy electronic equipment, including unmanned aerial vehicles (UAVs), air defense systems (ADS), and artillery. Following the onset of the full-scale Russian invasion of Ukraine, EWs have played a key role in ensuring Ukraine's defensive capability. In particular, means of radio-electronic warfare deal with the suppression of mobile and satellite communications to disorient the enemy. EW has had a strong influence on all aspects of the Russian-Ukrainian war.

== Development history ==
According to "ArmiyaFM", the first experience of combat use of Ukrainian EW was during a peacekeeping operation in Iraq. The use of radio-electronic warfare among the Armed Forces of Ukraine (AFU) prevented the undermining of any personnel and equipment of the Ukrainian peacekeeping group. After this, other nations began to learn about Ukrainian EW technology allowing its specialists to be appraised at a higher level of ability. Until 2014, only four enterprises manufactured EW devices in Ukraine. Three of them were located in Donetsk and the Donetsk Oblast in territory occupied by Russia as of August 2024. These factories produced only eight types of installations, consisting mostly of radio suppression and radio jamming equipment. After Russia occupied Crimea and the eastern regions of Ukraine in 2014, the demand for EW in Ukraine increased dramatically, leading to significant production increases and the founding of new private enterprises. Despite this, on February 24, 2022, almost 65% of the anti-aircraft missiles that the AFU had in their arsenal were still of Soviet design.

After the start of the full-scale Russian invasion of Ukraine, the number of domestically produced EWs doubled. Companies receive active support in the codification of their products from the Brave1 platform, a Government of Ukraine platform to bring together companies to promote innovation and development of military technologies for Ukrainian defense. During the platform's first year of operation in 2023, it united more than 50 manufacturers. In 2023, the Ministry of Digital Transformation announced the Ukrainian development of its EW system created as part of the Brave1— the Piranha AVD 360 program. The autumn 2023 Russian losses were high, but their more distributed and decentralized electronic systems were more effective in blunting Ukrainian counteroffensives, particularly in jamming American rockets. As of 2024, almost the entire share of the production of electronic warfare equipment in Ukraine is exclusively produced by private companies, some of which work in partnership with foreign manufacturers. Ukrainian companies have increased production of jamming gear and have become nimble in adjusting to battlefield changes of the frequency spectrum being utilized.

== Types of EW ==
In conflict, dominance in the electromagnetic space gives one party an advantage over its enemy in the management of troops and weapons. This is greatly aided by means of radio-electronic warfare (EW), which is one of the most significant and important elements of contemporary wars and, as a result, has had the most rapid and dynamic development among all modern types of weapons. Ukrainian EW tools can be divided into several main types:

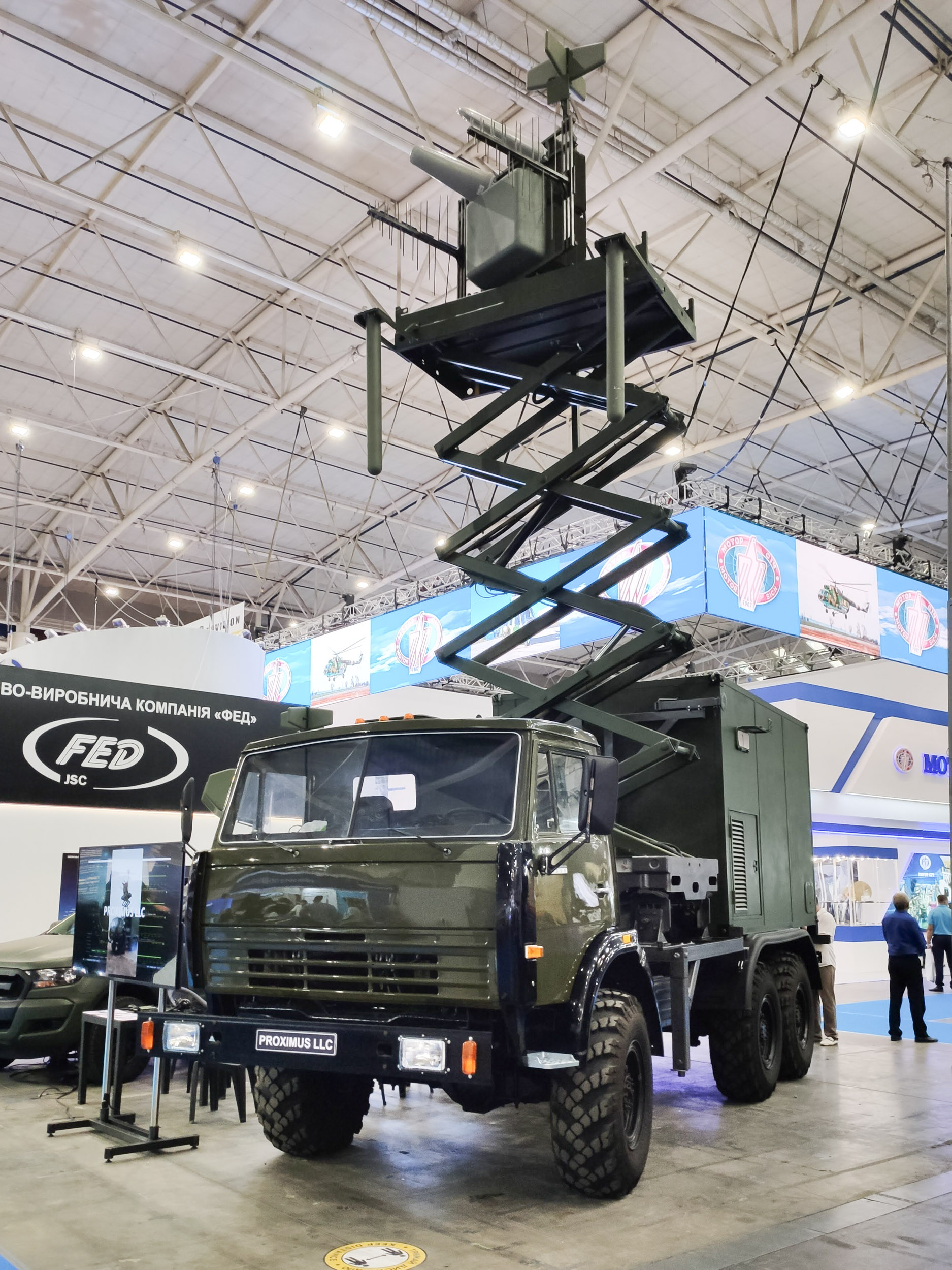
Proximus Prometheus-MF5 electronic warfare system in Kyiv, 2021

=== Signals intelligence (SI) ===
Signals intelligence (Ukrainian: Засоби радіоелектронної розвідки) systems are designed to detect and analyze enemy combatant signals. SI is very important for military intelligence because it acts as the main, and in many cases the only, way to obtain intelligence information of adversarial parties. SI detects intelligence, and can intercept and analyze radio transmissions and radio-electronic emissions. SI can also determine the location of enemy radio-electronic systems, and works without direct contact with intelligence objects, can cover large distances and space, and can work continuously at different times of the year and day and in any weather. SI systems used by Ukraine can provide highly reliable information due to it directly coming from the enemy. According to various estimates, 80–90% of primary information uncovered by Ukraine is obtained by means of SI.

=== Radio electronic suppression (RES) ===
Radio electronic suppression (Ukrainian: Засоби радіоелектронного подавлення) is aimed at the jamming and suppression of enemy signals, including radio communications, drone control systems, and other electronic systems. RES counters any weapon systems that use radio-electronic or opto-electronic (infrared or laser) guidance or aiming systems. In their work, RES systems use two methods: they set obstacles and generate false signals. In most modern examples of electronic suppression technology, especially in the naval forces, both methods are used in a single integrated system. This also includes false targets, which are fakes that imitate real military objects. They can be similar in shape to a missile, drone or other type of weapon, and can emit thermal and electronic traces as well as engine sounds to sound closer to a real weapon. Deceptions are used to distract the enemy and force them to waste ammunition on non-existent military objects.

=== Radio-electronic protection (REP) ===
Radio-electronic protection (Ukrainian: Засоби радіоелектронного захисту) is used for the physical and technical protection of Ukraine's own control systems and combat capability, as well as protection of personnel. REP acts as a response to electronic suppression measures, whose components are in constant competition with each other. Ukraine's current REP models generally correspond to the development and introduction of weapons and counterweapons, akin to the shield and the sword in historical combat. REP covers all methods and means that radio-electronics has, including measures to ensure the concealment of the actions of radar systems, methods of complexation and duplication, and special methods of interference-resistant signal processing. REP is very important in combat, because in case of weakness of radio-electronic protection, the enemy can get receive all the information about any vulnerable points in the army.

== Technical characteristics ==
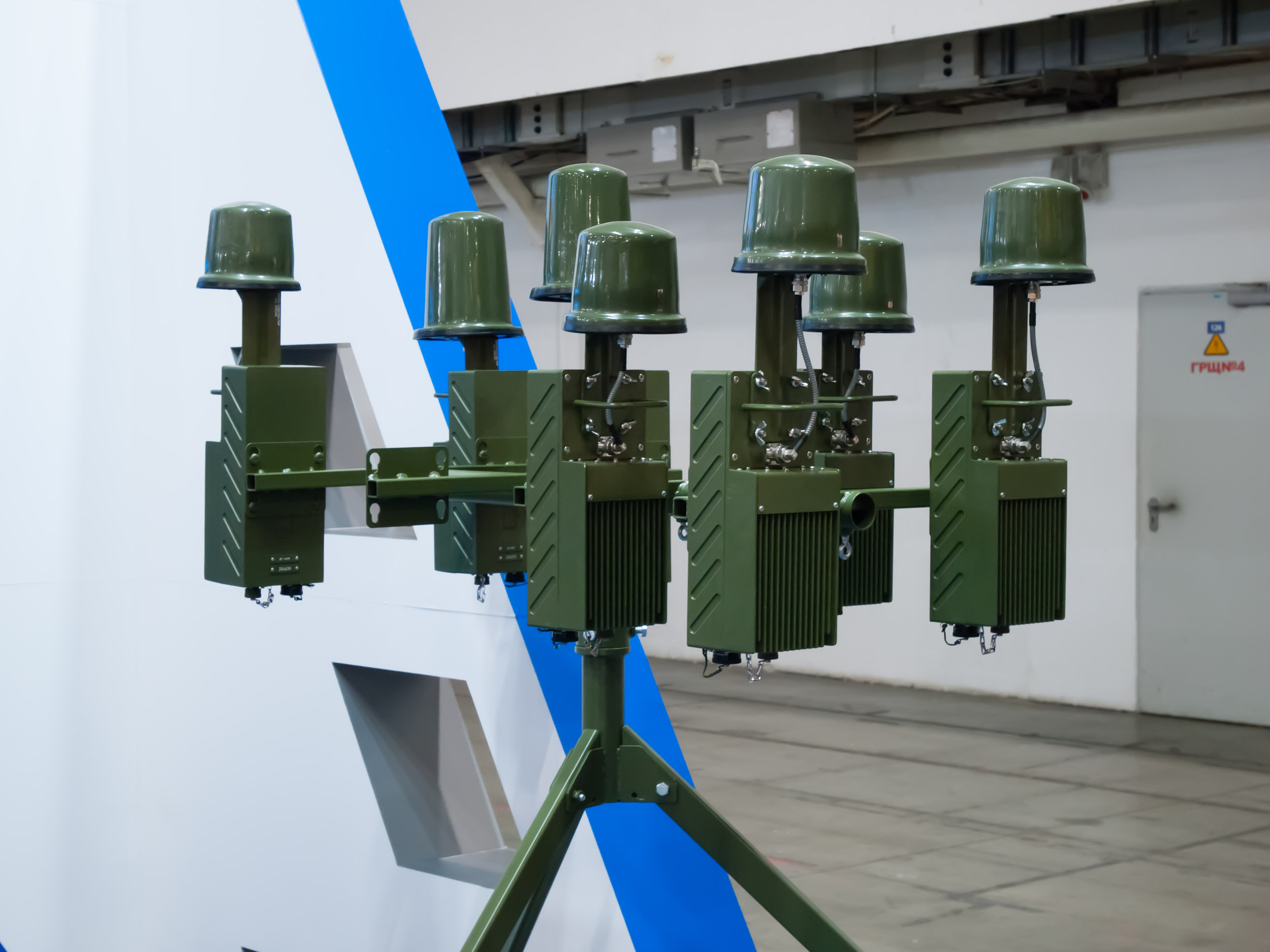
Note electronic warfare system in Kyiv, 2019

Ukraine has a variety of EW systems in service. According to the range of their action, they are conditionally divided into three groups: trench, tactical and strategic-operational:

- Trench electronic warfare: Work on certain areas of the front, where they are used to provide cover from the enemy strongholds or locations where military personnel are currently stationed. Such EWs have a relatively short range, up to 50 km.
- Tactical electronic warfare: Such means of electronic warfare have a longer range - 500 kilometers. Nowadays, during the Russo-Ukrainian war, they are used not only to cover the military, but also to work behind enemy lines. Such EWs track enemy repeaters and air targets. They can also block communication channels, or vice versa, and can create substations. It is possible to form a single network from tactical EWs if you connect them with a satellite.
- Strategic-operational electronic warfare: Systems operating at a distance of more than 500 kilometers. Such systems effectively counter enemy aircraft, ships, and other equipment far away before they can cross the border into conflict territory.

In addition, systems can be mobile and can be easily moved and quickly redeployed in any place to provide powerful radio-electronic protection. Mobile systems can also be placed on cars. Mobile stations can also be stationary systems — placed on permanent objects to provide long-term protection of important infrastructure objects from radio-electronic threats.

Ukrainian EW systems are characterized by Ukrainian information security researchers emphasize the role of advanced technology and reliability to create combat-ready systems to work effectively in different conditions and counter a wide range of threats. In February 2024, the Pokrova EW system became operational in Ukraine, and is capable of intercepting Russian attack drones. The system uses technology that replaces satellite signals and confuses the navigation devices of enemy drones, causing them to deviate from the route and fly past the target or fall without causing damage.

== Systems ==
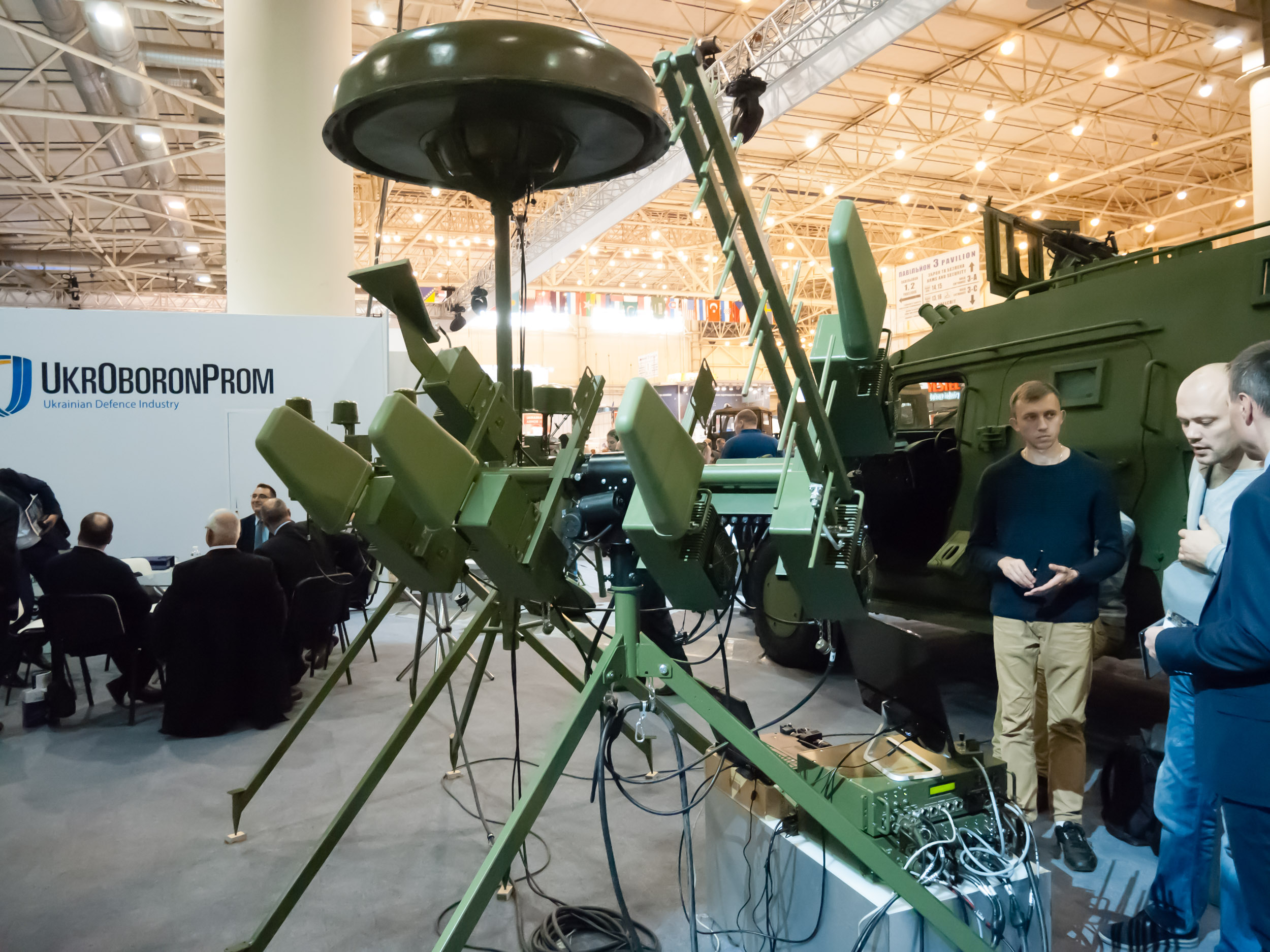
Note electronic warfare system at the 'Zbroya ta Bezpeka' military fair in Kyiv, 2018

Due to the necessity of dynamic innovation of Ukrainian EW systems to resist Russia's invasion, many Ukrainian EW technologies are unique systems that do not have analogues either in Russia or in the West, with an emphasis on their efficiency and compactness. The following settings can be noted:

- Bukovel: The Bukovel EW set was developed by the Proximus company. The first samples began to be used in combat in 2015. The Bukovel installation detects enemy UAVs at a distance of up to 100 kilometers, and blocks data transmission, control, and navigation signals using GPS, GLONASS, Galileo, and BeiDou positioning systems at a distance of 15-20 kilometers.
- Enclave: Enclave[uk] (Ukrainian: Анклав) was developed by Ukrspetstechnika beginning prior to 2014, and was first put into use in 2016 in the war zone in Donbas. The "Enclave" EW creates interference for receivers operating on the frequencies of the GLONASS and GPS navigation systems. The radius of action is up to 40 kilometers. There is a smaller version of the "Enclave-Malyuk" set. It has twice as many antennas, weighs about 15 kg, and the time of continuous autonomous operation is increased from 2 to 6 hours.
- Note: The Note[uk] (Ukrainian: Нота) kit began development in parallel with the Bukovel and Enclave installations after the initial Russian invasion of Ukraine in 2014. The manufacturer is the Tritel company. The Note EW is capable of suppressing cellular communication networks of all standards common in Ukraine, and can also counteract EW tools and counter-battery radars. The complex is capable of detecting UAVs at a distance of at least 20 km, and is able to counter them at a distance of 15 km. Cellular communication can be neutralized at a distance of up to 1 km.
- Hecate: Hecate's (Ukrainian: Геката) development was first presented in February 2021. The system detects and classifies the signals of radars, types of radio-electronic warfare, air defense, and aviation. Compared to classic stationary radio reconnaissance systems, Hecate can move quickly, adapting to the dynamics of different kinds and phases of hostilities. It can track objects at distances of up to 450 kilometers.
- Dandelion: Dandelion (Ukrainian: Кульбаба) is a newer dome multi-band device that protects vehicles from FPV drones operating at frequencies of 700-1010 MHz. It can be used for the defense of small observation points as a Trench EW. Its radius of action is 150 meters. The "Dandelion" system uses cloverleaf and quadrifilar antennas, which do not have vulnerable zones unlike collinear "pins". Also, the dome EW has the possibility of expanding the spectrum of frequencies with which it works. The "Dandelion 100" system has already been successfully tested by the Ukrainian military at the frontline.
- PARASOL: A trench EW from Brave1. The developer has two EW modifications: one protects positions from Russian drones, while the other protects equipment at a distance of 200 meters.

== Application ==
Ukrainian EW complexes play a significant role in the post-invasion Russo-Ukrainian war. They work not only on the battlefield, but throughout the country, and are capable of protecting critical infrastructure, nuclear plants, and hydraulic structures.

With the assistance of EW systems during the Battle of Kyiv in 2022, the Ukrainian military destroyed Russian combat drones and effectively blocked reconnaissance devices. Another example of EW playing a key role in protecting civilians took place during the Russian missile attack on the night of January 13, 2023. Russia used cruise, aeroballistic, ballistic, aircraft-fired, and anti-aircraft guided missiles in addition to attack drones against Ukraine. Ukrainian air defense destroyed 7 Kh-101/kh-555/Kh-55 cruise missiles and 1 Kh-59 guided air missile. The Ukrainian Air Force noted that more than 20 air attack vehicles were not included in the downed statistics, because they simply lost control and fell due to active interference from electronic warfare equipment. The American think tank "Institute for the Study of War" (ISW) called this event a "change" in the capabilities of Ukrainian EW. It was noted there that earlier, the capabilities of radio-electronic warfare were used to disable drones, but not missiles.

In just one week on the frontline, from July 18 to July 24, 2024, Ukrainian fighters of the electronic warfare units managed to neutralize almost 8,000 Russian drones. The commander of the Ground Forces, Lieutenant General Oleksandr Pavlyuk, reported on the results of the work of the Ukrainian EW. He published statistics, which stated that EW "suppressed" 7,916 enemy UAVs. Of these, 4,313 units were winged drones, and 3,603 units were FPV drones.

Calculations showed that 1,979 drones per day or 82 per hour were forcibly stopped on the 700-kilometer front line.

== International cooperation ==
Ukraine actively cooperates with other countries in the field of electronic warfare (EW) production, and experts regularly participate in international training and exchange of experience. On February 17, 2024, the Coalition of Drones officially began its work. This is an organization of countries referred to as a capability coalition, established as a subgroup of the Ukraine Defense Contact Group (UDCG), that participates in the production and transfer of unmanned aerial vehicles, including EW, to Ukraine in order to repel Russian attacks. The leaders of the coalition are the United Kingdom and Latvia. Denmark, Estonia, Lithuania, Canada, the Netherlands, Germany and Sweden also joined the work.

An extra separate Electronic Warfare capability coalition (under the leadership of Germany and Sweden) have been formed within UDCG in April 2025, for procurement of EW capabilities, training, and the development of EW policies and doctrine.

== Units ==
=== Ground Forces ===
- 20th Electronic Warfare Battalion A1262, Zhytomyr
- 305th Electronic Warfare Regiment A0532, Kostopil
- 306th Separate Electronic Warfare Battalion A0528, Odessa
- 436th Separate Electronic Warfare Battalion A2196, Lviv
- 502nd Electronic Warfare Regiment A1828, Cherkaske

=== Air Force ===
- 17th Separate Electronic Warfare Battalion A1267, Kolomyia
- 1194th Separate Electronic Warfare Battalion A2709, Pervomaisk
- 2204th Electronic Warfare Battalion
