= List of equipment of the Lithuanian Armed Forces =

This is a list of weapons and equipment currently used by the Lithuanian Armed Forces.

Lithuania uses military equipment compatible with the NATO standards.

== Infantry weapons ==
Model	Image	Origin	Type	Variant	Calibre	Notes
Handguns
Glock 17		Austria	Semi-automatic pistol	Glock 17 Gen 4	9×19mm Parabellum	Standard issue pistol.
Heckler & Koch SFP9		Germany	Semi-automatic pistol	SFP9 SF	9×19mm Parabellum	Contract signed in August 2020 for a new pistol to arm the Lithuanian Armed Forces. Deliveries 2020 - 2026.
Submachine guns
Uzi		Israel	Machine pistol Submachine gun	Mini Uzi Uzi SMG	9×19mm Parabellum	
Heckler & Koch MP5		West Germany; Germany	Submachine gun	MP5A3 MP5SD3	9×19mm Parabellum	
Heckler & Koch MP7		Germany	PDW; Personal defence weapon	MP7A2	HK 4.6×30mm	Order in October 2023. Partial delivery of the MP7A2, worth €1.3 million, delivered in August 2024, with an estimated delivery of 276 in 2024.
Assault rifles
Heckler & Koch G36		Germany	Carabine / Assault rifle	G36KA4M2 G36KA4M2C G36KA4M1 G36KA4 G36KV1 G36C	5.56×45mm NATO	Standard issue assault rifle.
Heckler & Koch HK416		Germany	Assault rifle	HK416A5	5.56×45mm NATO	Used by Lithuanian Special Operations Force.
Machine guns
FN Minimi		Belgium	Light machine gun	5.56 Para 7.62 Mk3	5.56×45mm NATO 7.62×51mm NATO	FN MINIMI 5.56 Para version is used by Lithuanian Special Operations Force. FN Minimi 7.62 Mk3 version ordered in 2023 and 2024.
Rheinmetall MG3		Germany	General-purpose machine gun	—	7.62×51mm NATO	
FN MAG		Belgium; Sweden	General-purpose machine gun	Ksp 58B / FN MAG	7.62×51mm NATO	Typically mounted on lightly armoured vehicles, or armoured personnel carriers, as first or second weapons in parallel with M2 Browning machine gun and automatic grenade launcher, or as coaxial machine guns.
M2 Browning		Belgium; United States	Heavy machine guns	M2HB-QCB M2HB	12.7×99mm NATO	Typically mounted on lightly armoured vehicles or armoured personnel carriers, tripod version is also available. M2HB-QCB bought from Belgium and used since 2014.
Sniper rifles
FN SCAR		Belgium	Designated marksman rifle	SCAR-H PR	7.62×51mm NATO	Standard issue marksman rifle.
FR F2		France	Bolt action sniper rifle	—	7.62×51mm NATO	
GOL Sniper Magnum		West Germany	Bolt action sniper rifle	—	7.62×51mm NATO	
Heckler & Koch PSG1		West Germany	Semi-automatic sniper rifle	MSG90A1	7.62×51mm NATO	
Sako TRG		Finland	Bolt action sniper rifle	TRG-22	7.62×51mm NATO	
Accuracy International AXMC		United Kingdom	Bolt action sniper rifle	—	7.62×51mm NATO 8.6×70mm	
Desert Tech SRS		United States	Bolt action sniper rifle	SRS-A1	8.6×70mm	
M14		United States	Semi-automatic sniper rifle	M14L1 M14 EBR SOP M14 MDV	7.62×51mm NATO	M14 EBR SOP version used by Lithuanian Special Operations Force.
Anti-material rifles
Barrett M82		United States	Semi-automatic anti materiel rifle	M82A1	12.7×99mm NATO	
Barrett M107		United States	Semi-automatic anti materiel rifle	M107A1	12.7×99mm NATO	
Desert Tech HTI		United States	Bolt action anti materiel rifle	—	12.7×99mm NATO	
Miscellaneous firearms
Benelli M4		Italy	Semi-automatic shotgun	M4 Super 90	12 gauge	Used by Lithuanian Special Operations Force.
Heckler & Koch P2A1		West Germany	Flare gun	P2A1	12 gauge	Military flare pistol.
Grenades
Arges OFFHGR-85		Germany	Offensive hand grenade	—	—	
Arges SPLHGR-85		Germany	Defensive hand grenade	—	—	
M18		United States	Smoke grenade	—	—	
Rökfackla 4	—	Sweden	Smoke grenade	—	—	
Grenade launchers
Heckler & Koch AG36		Germany	Grenade launcher	—	40×46 mm LV	
Heckler & Koch HK269		Germany	Grenade launcher	—	40×46 mm LV	
Heckler & Koch GMG		Germany	Automatic grenade launcher	—	40×53 mm HV	Typically mounted on lightly armoured vehicles, or armoured personnel carriers, tripod version is also available.
Anti-tank weapons
Carl Gustav		Sweden	Recoilless rifle	M2 M3 M4	84 mm	
AT4		Sweden	Disposable recoilless guns	—	84 mm	
M72 LAW		Norway; United States	Disposable rocket launcher	M72A2 M72A7 M72E10 Other	66 mm	
FGM-148 Javelin		United States	Anti-tank guided missile	—	127 mm	144 CLU and 871 missiles purchased from the United States. In service from 2002. More missiles acquired at the end of 2025.
Mines
Sentry	—	Finland	Anti-tank mine	—	—	Supplied by Forcit Defence.

== Light equipment and accessories ==
=== Infantry equipment and accessories ===
Model	Image	Origin	Type	Variant	Quantity	Notes
Vests
Mehler Vario System tactical vest	—	Germany	Armoured vest	—	26 000	
Sights
Raytheon ELCAN		Canada	Optical sight	—	—	Purchased in 2023, used with 5.56mm and 7.62mm rifles.
AN/PVS-14		USA	Monocular night vision device	—	—	
Brolis LP5X	—	Lithuania	Laser sight	—	—	Orders: 2024, contract worth €17 million; Deliveries: December 2024
Brolis BPS14	—	European Union; Lithuania	Monocular night vision device	—	—	Orders: 2024, contract worth €17 million; Deliveries: December 2024

=== Observation and reconnaissance ===
Model	Image	Origin	Type	Variant	Quantity	Notes
Observation and target acquisition
Safran MOSKITO TI™		Switzerland	Multifunction IR goggles (laser range finder, laser pointer, compass, inclinometers)	—	—	€9 million contract (Spring 2019) through the NSPA. It was delivered between May and August 2020. Equipment used for observation and artillery target acquisition.
Safran JIM Compact™		Switzerland	Multifunction IR goggles (laser range finder, laser pointer, compass, inclinometers)	—	—	€9 million contract (Spring 2019) through the NSPA. It was delivered between May and August 2020. Equipment used for observation and artillery target acquisition.
Safran STERNA		Switzerland	Goniometer (inertial target acquisition system)	—	—	€9 million contract (Spring 2019) through the NSPA. It was delivered between May and August 2020. Equipment used for observation and artillery target acquisition.

== Indirect fire ==
=== Mortars ===
Model	Image	Origin	Type	Variant	Calibre	Quantity	Notes
Light infantry mortars
Hirtenberger M6		Austria	Infantry mortar	M6-895	60 mm	—	
M60		People's Republic of Bulgaria	Infantry mortar	—	60 mm	—	Acquired second-hand from Poland.
LM-60		Poland	Infantry mortar	—	60 mm	—	Acquired second-hand from Poland.
M19		United States	Infantry mortar	—	60 mm	—	
Heavy mortars
M38/43		Soviet Union	Heavy mortar	—	120 mm	18	Acquired second-hand from Poland.
2B11		Soviet Union	Heavy mortar	—	120 mm	20	Acquired second-hand from Bulgaria.
M 1982		Czechoslovakia	Heavy mortar	—	120 mm	2	Acquired second-hand from the Czech Republic.
M/41D		Finland	Heavy mortar	—	120 mm	22	Acquired second-hand from Sweden.
Expal 120-MX2-SM		Spain	Heavy mortar	—	120 mm	70	Contract signed in October 2022 (€9.8 million). The deliveries took place in 2024.
Self-propelled mortars
Panzermörser M113		United States; Germany; Finland	Mortar carrier	—	120 mm	30	42 mortar carriers with Tampella 120 mm mortars. Acquired from Germany in 2005 and 2006. Modernised in cooperation with Israel in 2015. In November 2022, 12 units were donated to Ukraine.

=== Tube artillery ===
Model	Image	Origin	Type	Variant	Calibre	Quantity	Notes
Towed artillery
M101		United States	Towed howitzer	M101A1	105 mm L/22	Less than 36 (up to +18 for spares)	Lithuania purchased 72 M101A1 (second-hand) from Denmark in 2002 (18 of them for spares only). At least 18 units were donated to Ukraine.
Self-propelled artillery
CAESAR		France	Self-propelled howitzer	CAESAR Mk2	155 mm L/52	0 (+48 on order)	Orders: 18 in December 2022; 30 in December 2025; Delivery planned between 2027 and 2030.
PzH 2000		Germany	Self-propelled howitzer	PzH 2000 A2	155 mm L/52	16 (+2 for training, and +3 for spare parts)	Lithuania purchased 21 howitzers (second-hand) from Germany in September 2015 (16 in active service, 2 are used for training, 3 for spare parts). 18 were modernised and the last delivered in March 2022.

=== Rocket artillery ===
Model	Image	Origin	Type	Calibre	Quantity	Notes
M142 HIMARS		United States	Multiple launch rocket system	610 mm 430 mm 227 mm	0 (+16 on order)	Eight launchers with ammunition will be delivered in 2026. On 9 November 2022, the United States Department of State approved the sale of launchers and over 800 missiles, including GMLRS (M30A2 and M31A2), GMLRS-ER (XM403 and XM404) and MGM-140 ATACMS (M57 variant). In April 2026, the second battery with eight launchers was ordered.

=== Counter-battery radars ===
Model	Image	Origin	Type	Role	Variant	Quantity	Notes
Counter-battery
Thales GM200 MM		Netherlands	S-band (IEEE), AESA, 4D radar	Counter-battery fire	GM200 MM/C	1 (+5 on order)	The contract was signed in January 2024 and the systems were delivered in 2026. Common order of 28 radars with the Netherlands (9), Denmark (5), Norway (8) and the rest for Lithuania (6). The first delivery took place in November 2026. The radars are installed on Mercedes-Benz Zetros 3643 trucks.

== Armoured vehicles ==
=== Armoured fighting vehicles ===
Model	Image	Origin	Type	Variant	Quantity	Notes
Main battle tank
Leopard 2		Germany	Main battle tank	Leopard 2A8	0 (+44 on order)	Contract for the purchase of the Leopard 2A8 was confirmed in December 2024. The tanks will be equipped with the Trophy APS. 41 will be partially built in Lithuania by a joint venture between KNDS Deutschland and Rheinmetall Landsysteme, and will be delivered 2028–30.
Infantry fighting vehicles
GTK Boxer		Germany; Israel	IFV; Infantry fighting vehicle	Vilkas	89 (+27 on order)	IFV Boxer program started in 2016. First order was of 91 (89 standard + 2 driver training) vehicles. Delivered between 2019 and 2023. The local designation IFV Vilkas. Armed with Israeli made Rafael Samson RCWS featuring a Mk44 Bushmaster II 30mm autocannon, FN MAG 7.62mm coaxial machine gun and Spike-LR and LR2 anti-tank missiles. The 89 IFVs are split: 55 squad leader vehicles; 18 platoon leaders vehicles; 12 company leader vehicles; 4 command posts vehicles. As of October 2024, 91 in service (2 driver training vehicles) and 27 on order.
CV90		Sweden	IFV; Infantry fighting vehicle	CV90 Mk IV	0 (+100 on order)	The State Defence Council began the acquisition process for the CV90 in October 2024, based on military advice. The plan was for 2 battalions. In December 2025, the order for 100 vehicles was approved by Lithuania. The start of the delivery is planned for 2028. The Lithuanian purchase is part of a common acquisition programme, the CV90 MkIV "Nordic" (with Finland, Sweden, Norway, Estonia, and the Netherlands).
Armoured personnel carriers
Patria 6×6		Finland	Armoured personnel carrier / Multi-role vehicle	Patria XA-300	0 (+936 on order)	In May 2026, The State Defense Council has approved the acquisition of Patria 6×6 wheeled armored personnel carriers. They will replace the M113 platform and will be used for maneuver, command, medical, fire support, engineering, information transmission, reconnaissance, and CBRN protection. The contract is expected to be signed in 2027.
M113		United States	Armoured personnel carrier	M113A1; M113A2	Less than 240	154 M113A1 and 200 M113A2 items acquired second-hand from Germany between 2000 and 2006, some of them non-operational (used as source for spare parts only); 8 fitted for logistic battalion (equipped with cranes), other modifications: infantry, medical and command. Many M113-vehicles have been donated to Ukraine. As of March 2026, Lithuania has donated at least 114 M113-vehicles to Ukraine.
M577		United States	Multi-role vehicle (Command post vehicle, Indirect fire support, MEDEVAC, Training vehicle)		Less than 178	Over 180 acquired second-hand from Germany in 2015–16. The vehicles are used for command, indirect fire support, medical evacuation and training purposes. An unspecified number was donated to Ukraine.
Armoured patrol and scout cars
Oshkosh JLTV		United States	Infantry mobility vehicle, MRAP	M1278 A1	500	200 ordered in 2019, delivered from 2021 to the end of 2023. 300 additional ordered in October 2022, delivered in 2025. The main variant in service in Lithuania is equipped with the OGPK Turrets with the M2HB-QCB. Another variant is used for air defence, equipped with the Saab MSHORAD / Saab Giraffe 1X.
Humvee		United States	Armoured car	M1025; M1097; M1114; M1151	195+	Some are equipped with HK GMG, or M2 HB. Some donated to Ukraine.
Special forces armoured vehicles
Defenture VECTOR		Netherlands	Light utility vehicle	TBD	0 (+32 on order)	Chosen light utility vehicle for the Lithuanian Special Operations Force.
Toyota Land Cruiser		Japan; Norway	Light armoured vehicle	Land Cruiser 200 AT42M	5	Bought for international missions, has protection from small arms and IEDs. From Arctic Truck company. 7 donated to Ukraine army.

=== Armoured training vehicles ===
Model	Image	Origin	Type	Variant	Quantity	Notes
GTK Boxer		Germany; Netherlands	Driver training vehicle	Vilkas	2	Delivered between 2017 and 2021, local Lithuanian designation IFV Vilkas.

== Unarmoured vehicles ==
=== Light utility vehicles ===
Model	Image	Origin	Type	Variant	Quantity	Notes
Amphibious vehicle
Bv 206		Sweden	Amphibious tracked articulated vehicle	Bandvagn 206	10+	Acquired second-hand from Norway. Used for several roles, among which: medical evacuation; air surveillance radar; troop transport.
Utility vehicles
Mercedes-Benz G-Class		Germany	Light utility vehicle	290 GD (W461)	690	Acquired second-hand from the Netherlands Armed Forces, received from 2016 to 2021.
Mercedes-Benz G-Class		Germany	Light utility vehicle	G350 D (W464)	273	273 vehicles were ordered in 2023, with all vehicles delivered by the end of 2023.
Mercedes-Benz G-Class		Germany	Military ambulance	G350 D (W464) - Rapid Medical Evacuation Models	—	Part of the purchase of 273 Mercedes-Benz G350D. The medical evacuation module was developed and made by Commercial Transport Service.
Toyota HiLux		Japan	Pickup	HiLux (gen 8, 2020 facelift)	30	Successor to the Mitsubishi L200 for the demining mission performed by the Juozas Vitkus Engineer Battalion, acquired in 2022.
Special forces light vehicles
Land Rover Defender		United Kingdom	Light utility vehicle	88; 90; 110	100+	Some equipped with HK GMG, Browning M2 50.cal HMG, or RBS 70.
Buggy
Arctic Cat		United States	Fast attack vehicle	Wild Cat 1000	10+	1 lost in exercise.
All-terrain vehicles
Can-Am Outlander 1000 MAX		Canada	All-terrain vehicle	1000 MAX XTP	10+	Lithuanian army used to patrol the border with Belarus, after the Belarusian hybrid attack on Lithuania.
Motorcycle
KTM 530		Austria	Motorcycle	530 EXC-R	—	Standard SF motorcycle.

=== Logistic vehicles ===
Model	Image	Origin	Type	Variant	Quantity	Notes
Trucks
Sisu E13TP		Finland	Armoured high mobility terrain vehicle	E13TP	50	It is in 2 variants in the Army. One is the Paletized Load System (hooklift truck) and the other is a recovery variant.
Mercedes-Benz Arocs		Germany	Truck 8×8	Arocs 4142 AK	255	25 ordered in 2020. An additional 230 Arocs are being purchased. Delivery of the trucks is planned from 2023 to 2030. Transport capacity: 17 t (37,000 lb).
Mercedes-Benz Zetros		Germany	Off-road capable tractor truck 6×6	Zetros 3643	8	Used for transporting Panzerhaubitze 2000, M113 and Bergepanzer 2. The trailer purchased is from EMPL, with 6 axles. Towing capacity: 70 t (150,000 lb).
Mercedes-Benz Zetros		Germany	Truck 6×6	Zetros 2733	141	141 Zetros with cranes are being purchased. Delivery of the trucks is planned from 2023 to 2030. Transport capacity: 10 t (22,000 lb).
Mercedes-Benz Unimog		Germany	Truck 4×4	U1550	~ 160	
Mercedes-Benz Unimog		Germany	Truck 4×4	U5000	500	Unimog U5000 ordered in several batches through the NSPA: 340 ordered in 2015; Order 2022 (at least 80); 51 ordered in September 2024; Deliveries: 88 in 2018; 110 in 2019; 142 in 2020 (completed 2015 order of 340); 42 in October 2021 (total 382 U5000 and 160 U1550 at the time); 34 July 2023; October 2024; Transport capacity: 5 t (11,000 lb).
Mercedes-Benz NG		West Germany	Military truck	1017A; 1213	200-250	Acquired second-hand from the Netherlands.
DAF F218 series		Netherlands	Military truck	YAS 4442; YKS 2300	225	Acquired second-hand from the Netherlands.
Oshkosh FMTV		United States	Military truck	FMTV A2	—	Delivered as part of the 1st Division development plan.
Logistic equipment
Manitou MLT 627		France	Telescopic handler	MLT 627 TC	—	
Magni HTH 27		Italy	5-ton telescopic handlers	HTH 27.11	3 (+1 on order)	Received in September 2023
Kramer KT 557		Germany	Telescopic handlers	—	—	The last batch of loaders was purchased under a contract concluded with Dojus Agro in 2022. Some were donated to Ukraine in January 2025.
Liebherr LTM1250		Germany; Switzerland	Mobile crane	LTM1250-5.1	—	

=== Civilian vehicles ===
Model	Image	Origin	Type	Variant	Quantity	Notes
Cars
Fiat Dobló		Italy	Car	Dobló (gen 1 facelift)	65	Standard army panel van.
Škoda Superb		Czech Republic	Car	Superb (gen 2)	10	Standard military police patrol car.
Škoda Superb		Czech Republic	Car	Superb (gen 3)	5	Standard military police pursuit and patrol car.
Peugeot Expert		France	Light commercial vehicle, 4×4	Dangel Expert (gen 3)	127	Standard army light commercial vehicle / multi purpose vehicle.
Peugeot Rifter		France	Light commercial vehicle	Rifter (gen 3)	235	Standard army light commercial vehicle / multi purpose vehicle.
Buses
MAN		Germany	Coach	—	—	Military orchestra bus.

== Medical equipment ==
Model	Image	Origin	Type	Quantity	Notes
Field hospital		Estonia	Modular field hospital	1	

== Engineering equipment ==
=== Support vehicles ===
Model	Image	Origin	Type	Variant	Quantity	Notes
Armoured support vehicles
Bergepanzer 2		West Germany	Armoured recovery vehicle	—	10	10 acquired second-hand from Germany, delivered between 2015 and 2020. 4 of the Bpz 2 were modernised.
M113		United States	Armoured fitter and repair vehicle	M113 MTVF	8	Acquired second-hand from the USA.
Sisu E13TP - EMPL Bison		Finland; Austria	Recovery truck	—	—	

=== Bridging equipment ===
Model	Image	Origin	Type	Variant	Quantity	Notes
PMP floating bridge		Soviet Union; Ukraine	Pontoon bridge	—	24 bridges 19 trucks	Transported on KrAZ-214 trucks.
Leopard 2 Leguan		Germany	Armoured vehicle-launched bridge	—	0 (+ 12 on order)	Ordered in January 2026. It includes: 12 × 26-meter bridges; 24 × 14-meter bridges; transport trucks for additional bridges

=== Machines ===
Model	Image	Origin	Type	Variant	Quantity	Notes
Caterpillar new D4		United States	Bulldozer	D4 (Tier 4 - stage 5)	2	
Komatsu D61		Japan	Bulldozer	D61PX	—	
Hidromek HMK 102		Turkey	Backhoe loader	HMK 102 S SUPRA	2	
JCB 4CX		United Kingdom	Backhoe loader	Unarmoured 4CX	—	
Komatsu WA250		Japan	Wheeled loader	WA250-5	—	

=== EOD and demining equipment ===
Model	Image	Origin	Type	Variant	Quantity	Notes
Demining vehicles
DOK-ING MV-10		Croatia	Unmanned mine clearance vehicle	—	—	—
Telerob tEODor		Germany	EOD, unmanned ground vehicle	—	—	—

== Unmanned aerial vehicles ==
=== Intelligence, surveillance, reconnaissance UAS ===
Model	Image	Origin	Type	Role	Notes
ScanEagle		United States	Fixed-wing unmanned aerial vehicle	Intelligence, surveillance, target acquisition, and reconnaissance	
RQ-11		United States	Fixed-wing mini unmanned aerial vehicle	Intelligence, surveillance, target acquisition, and reconnaissance	
Hornet; Hornet XR		Lithuania	Fixed-wing mini unmanned aerial vehicle	Intelligence, surveillance, target acquisition, and reconnaissance	
UDS Partisan Recon		Lithuania	Fixed-wing mini unmanned aerial vehicle	Intelligence, surveillance, target acquisition, and reconnaissance	
EOS C VTOL		Estonia	Mini unmanned aerial vehicle	Intelligence, surveillance, target acquisition, and reconnaissance	
Penguin C VTOL		Latvia	Fixed-wing small unmanned aerial vehicle	Intelligence, surveillance, target acquisition, and reconnaissance	
AeroVironment Jump 20		USA	Fixed-wing small unmanned aerial vehicle	Intelligence, surveillance, target acquisition, and reconnaissance	

=== Loitering munitions ===
Model	Image	Origin	Type	Role	Notes
AeroVironment Switchblade 600		United States	Medium range, deployable-wing, mini loitering munition	Anti-armour and anti-personnel effects	In December 2020, Lithuania signed a contract to acquire Switchblade 600 loitering munitions. The systems were delivered in October 2026.
Granta X		Lithuania	Unknown range, fixed-wing, loitering munition	Anti-armour and anti-personnel effects	
RSI Europe Špokas		Lithuania	Medium range, first-person view mini loitering munition	Anti-armour and anti-personnel effects	
Granta GA-10FPV-AI		Lithuania	Unknown range, first-person view mini loitering munition	Anti-armour and anti-personnel effects	

== Equipment of the Lithuanian Air Force ==
=== Air defence equipment ===
==== Surveillance radars ====
Model	Image	Origin	Type	Role	Variant	Quantity	Notes
Short to medium range air surveillance
AN/MPQ-64 Sentinel		United States	X-band (IEEE), PESA, 3D radar	Short range, surveillance radar	MPQ-64	2	Part of the short air defence units, ordered in 2002.
Saab Giraffe		Sweden	C-band (IEEE), PESA	Short range, low altitude, surveillance radar	Giraffe MkIV	6	Part of the short range air defense units. Second-hand purchase from Norway, installed on BV206. Some donated to Ukraine in 2023.
ELM-2138M Green Rock		Israel	GaN, AESA, 3D	Short range multi-mission tactical radar			Ordered in 2018.
Hensoldt Twinvis		Germany	Passive radar				Delivered in 2026.
Medium and long range air surveillance radar
TRML-3D		Germany	C-band (IEEE), GaN, PESA radar, 3D radar	Early warning radar (medium range)	TRML-3D/32	3	Acquired in 2004.
AN/TPS-77		United States	L-band (IEEE), GaN, AESA, 3D, mobile radar	Early warning radar (long range)	AN/TPS-77 MRR	3	Ordered in 2023, delivered in 2026.
LANZA 3D		Spain	L-band (IEEE), AESA, 3D, stationary radar	Early warning radar (long range)	LANZA 3D	3	Used by the Baltic Air Surveillance Network (BALTNET), and equipped with the LANZA 3D system, manufactured by Indra Sistemas, commissioned in 2018–2020.

=== Air defence systems ===
==== Firing control radars ====
Model	Image	Origin	Type	Role	Variant	Quantity	Notes
Fire control radar
AN/MPQ-64 Sentinel		United States	X-band (IEEE), PESA, 3D radar	Fire control radar	AN/MPQ-64F1	2 (+ unknown quantity on order)	Ordered in 2016 for 2 NASAMS air defence system. Additional radars for NASAMS ordered in 2023 and 2024.
Saab Giraffe 1X		Sweden	AESA, GaN, 3D, mobile, short range radar	Fire control radar	Land Giraffe 1X	Unknown quantity on order	Ordered for the RBS-70 MSHORAD air defence system, equipped on a JLTV, paired with a JLTV launching the missiles. Orders were placed in July 2024, October 2024 and April 2026

=== Medium range air defence systems ===
Model	Image	Origin	Variant	Quantity	Notes
NASAMS		Norway; United States	NASAMS 3	2 batteries (+1 battery on order)	The first battery for a $128 million deal delivered in 2020. Additional batteries with AIM-120C-8 missiles were ordered in 2023 and 2024 for €200 million and €234 million respectively. In total 3 batteries have been purchased by January 2026. AIM-9X Block II Sidewinder missiles ordered for NASAMS. The battery consists of: AN/MPQ-64 Sentinel, Kongsberg's Fire Distribution Center (FDC), Mercedes Actros 8×8 trucks on which the launchers are transported.

=== Short range air defence systems ===
Model	Image	Origin	Variant	Quantity	Notes
RBS 70 MSHORAD		Sweden	RBS 70 NG RWS	0 (+3 batteries on order)	Ordered by Lithuania for its Saab M-SHORAD fire units (July 2024, October 2024, December 2025), the deliveries will take place until 2030. Composition of a fire unit: Oshkosh JLTV "Mobile Firing Unit", equipped with a launcher with 3 RBS 70NG missiles ready to fire; Oshkosh JLTV "Mobile Radar Units", equipped with the GBAD C2 system and a Saab Giraffe 1X radar.

=== Man portable air defence systems ===
Model	Image	Origin	Variant	Notes
PZR Grom		Poland	—	Acquired in 2014. More missiles acquired later.
PPZR Piorun		Poland	—	Joint order by Lithuanian and Polish governments placed in 2024 and 2025. Complementary framework agreement signed in August 2026 with Norway, Poland and Latvia. Those acquisitions were made to replace the Grom missiles.
RBS 70		Sweden	RBS 70 NG	Purchased in 2004 – 21 launchers and 260 missiles second-hand from Norway. Modernised to RBS-70 NG version. A new batch of Mk-2 and Bolide missiles was ordered in October 2022. More Bolide missiles ordered in December 2025. 30 RBS missiles donated to Ukraine in February 2026.

==== Counter-UAV systems ====
Model	Image	Origin	Variant	Notes
EDM4S		Lithuania		Domestically produced anti-drone electronic warfare system.

== Reserve equipment ==
Model	Image	Origin	Type	Variants	Calibre	Quantity	Notes
Browning Hi-Power		Belgium	Semi-automatic pistol	—	9×19mm Parabellum	—	
M16 rifle		United States	Assault rifle	M16A2	5.56×45mm NATO	—	Weapons donated by NATO. They are now in the wartime reserve.
Automatkarbin 4		Sweden	Assault rifle	Heckler & Koch G3A3	7.62×51mm NATO	—	Weapons purchased from the Swedish surplus. They replaced the Cold War Soviet weapons in service, and are now in the wartime reserve. The HK G36 replaced the Ak4.
Rheinmetall MG 3		West Germany	General purpose machine gun	—	7.62×51mm NATO	~ 4,000	Weapons purchased from the German surplus. An estimate of 4,000 MG3 are in wartime reserve.
Pvpj 1110		Sweden	Recoilless rifle	—	90 mm	~ 200	Weapons donated by Sweden. Kept as a wartime reserve.
