= Granta Hornet =

Hornet
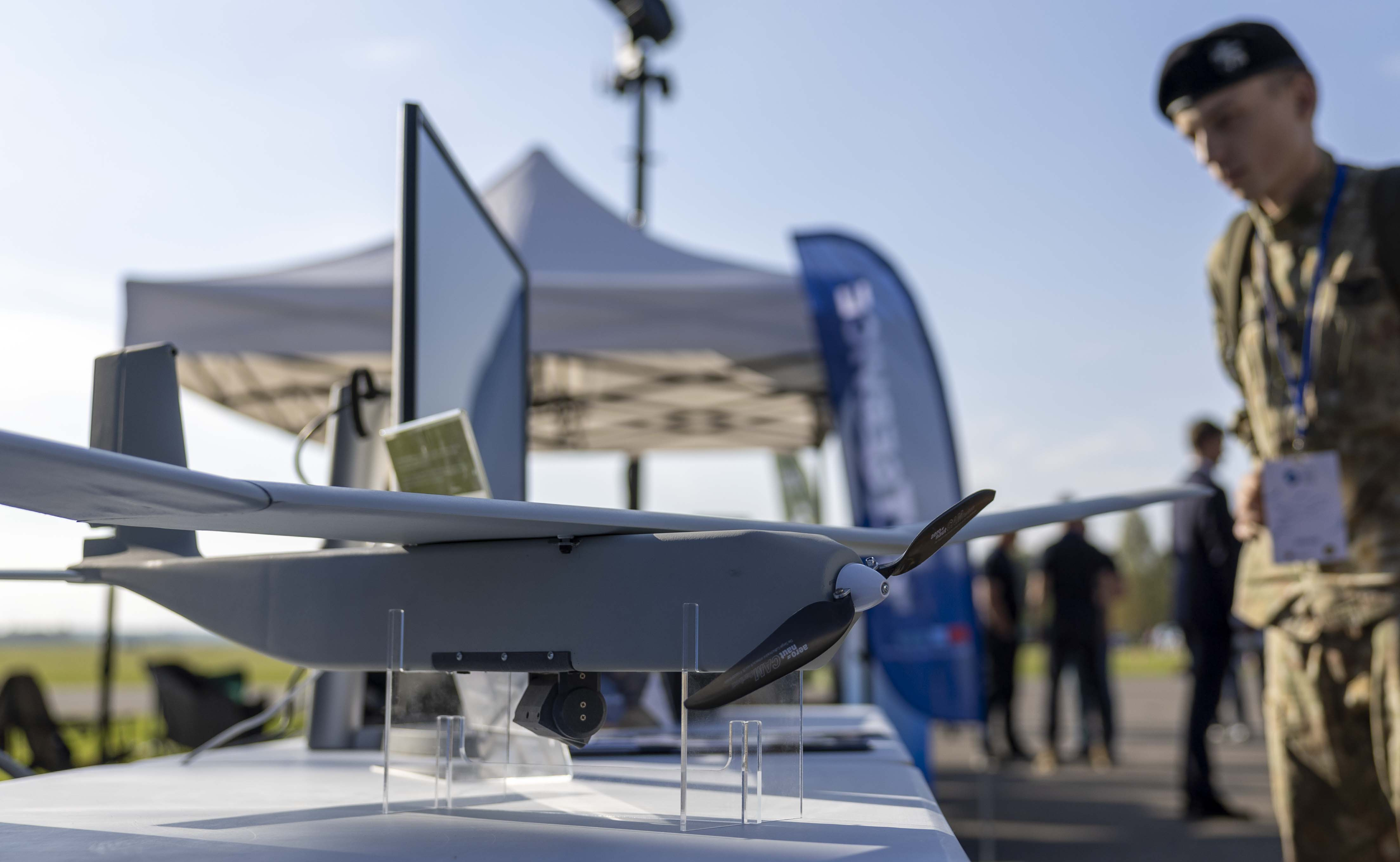
- Hornet XR model
- Type: Loitering munition
- Place of origin: Lithuania

Service history
- In service: 2024–present
- Wars: Russian invasion of Ukraine

Production history
- Manufacturer: Granta Autonomy
- Produced: 2023–present
- Variants: Granta Hornet; Granta Hornet XR

Specifications
- Operational range: Standard: 60 km (37 mi); XR: 160 km (99 mi)
- Guidance system: Autonomous; manual

Granta Hornet is a compact, hand-launched reconnaissance unmanned aerial vehicle (UAV) developed by Lithuanian defense technology firm Granta Autonomy.

== Development ==
Founded in 2015 by former military engineers Gediminas Guoba and Laurynas Litvinas, Granta Autonomy initially focused on software development before expanding into UAVs following the Russian annexation of Crimea.

The company has since emphasized battlefield-tested innovation, conducting real-world trials over Ukraine’s front lines to refine its technologies.

Following seed funding of €1 million in July 2024—led by ScaleWolf VC, Brolis Defence, and HFL Holdings—Granta accelerated development and production of its Hornet drones, gimbal systems, and datalink software to support NATO forces.

== Design ==
Known for its stealth, autonomy, and portability, the Hornet drone is designed for front-line intelligence, surveillance, and reconnaissance (ISR) operations.

The Hornet drone is capable of executing missions even in GPS-denied or electronically contested environments.

== Users ==
- Lithuania
  - Lithuanian Armed Forces
- Ukraine
  - Armed Forces of Ukraine

== See also ==
- Granta GA-10FPV-AI
- RSI Europe Špokas
- UDS Partisan Recon
- Granta X
