= UDS Partisan Recon =

- Type: Reconnaissance aircraft
- Place of origin: Lithuania

Service history
- In service: 2024–present
- Wars: Russian invasion of Ukraine

Production history
- Manufacturer: Unmanned Defense Systems
- Produced: 2024–present

Specifications
- Mass: 3.5 kg (7.7 lb)
- Operational range: 170 km (110 mi)
- Guidance system: Autonomous; manual

UDS Partisan Recon (commonly Partisan) is a reconnaissance unmanned aerial vehicle (UAV) developed by Unmanned Defense Systems (UDS), a Lithuanian defense technology company specializing in AI-driven swarm and ISR systems.

== Development and design ==
Founded in 2022 and based in Vilnius, Unmanned Defense Systems (UDS) is committed to integrating artificial intelligence into unmanned aerial platforms, pursuing an end-to-end system encompassing DETECT (ISTAR), ENGAGE (loitering munitions), and COMMAND (swarm/C2) capabilities within a unified architecture.

=== Funding ===
In May 2024, UDS raised €3.2 million in a Series A funding round, led by Coinvest Capital with contributions from private investors and key figures such as Vytenis Buzas (Executive Chairman) and CTO Ernestas Kalabuckas, to scale battlefield-proven UAVs—including the Partisan—and augment AI-based swarm integrations across battlefield management system.

== Design ==
The Partisan is a compact, long-range reconnaissance drone designed to perform missions typically executed by much larger UAV platforms.

== Users ==
- Lithuania
  - Lithuanian Armed Forces
- Ukraine
  - Armed Forces of Ukraine

== See also ==
- Granta GA-10FPV-AI
- RSI Europe Špokas
- Granta Hornet
- Granta X
