= Lithuanian Special Operations Forces =

- Lietuvos Specialiųjų Operacijų Pajėgos
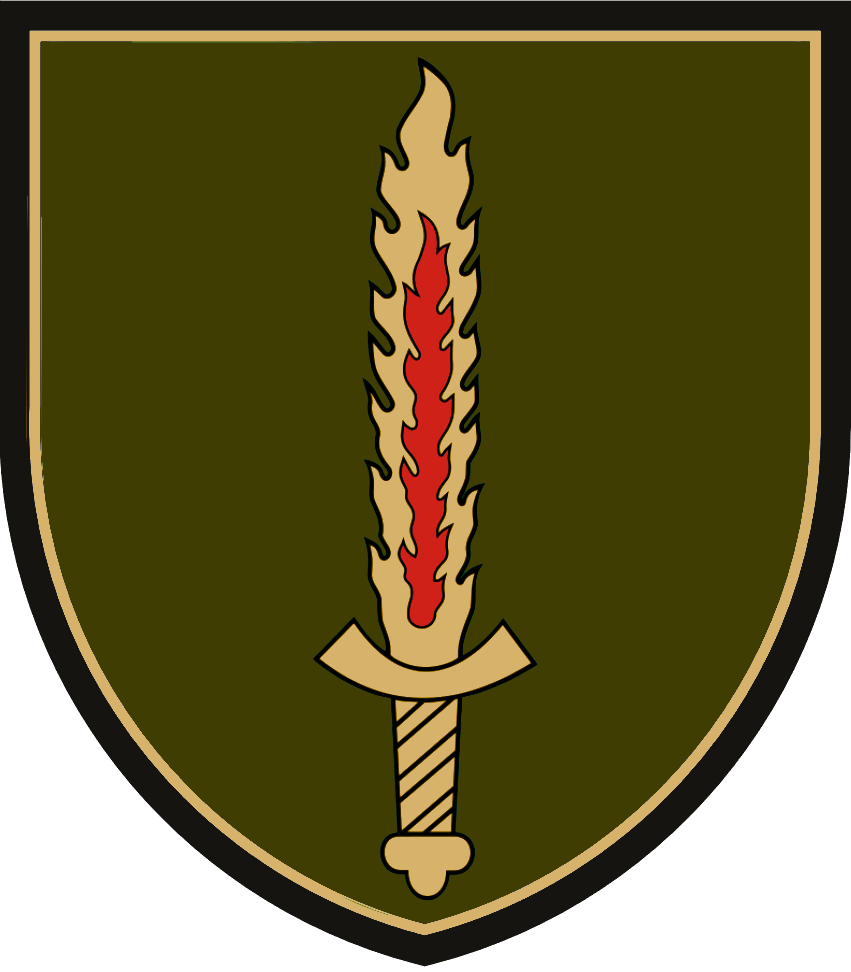
- SOF insignia
- Active: 1997–present
- Country: Lithuania
- Branch: Special Operation Forces
- Type: special operations
- Role: direct action, special reconnaissance, unconventional warfare
- Size: Classified
- Part of: Lithuanian Armed Forces
- Nickname(s): "Žaliukai" ((in English) like “forest / green brothers”); "Aitvaras" (named after a traditional Lithuanian mythological spirit)
- Engagements: War in Afghanistan (2002–2015) (2018–2021) EU Navfor Med (2017) NATO Response Force (2008–Present)

Insignia
- Flag

The Lithuanian Special Operations Forces (LITHSOF) (Lithuanian: Lietuvos Specialiųjų Operacijų Pajėgos) is a special operation unit of the Lithuanian Armed Forces, formed exclusively of carefully selected, motivated and specially trained professionals. The main tasks of the Special Operations Forces are direct action, special reconnaissance, and military assistance.

The Lithuanian Special Operations Forces has been in operation de facto since 2002 and it was established de jure on April 3, 2008, when amendments of the National Defence System organisation and military service law came into force. SOF is formed from the Special Operations Unit.

== Structure and tasks ==
The structure of the Lithuanian Special Operations Forces is flexible which makes it easy to form squadrons intended for specific operations and missions from its elements. It consists of:

- Special Operations Forces (SOP - Specialiųjų Operacijų Pajėgos) in Vilnius
  - Vytautas the Great Jaeger Battalion (VDJB - Vytauto Didžiojo jėgerių batalionas) in Kaunas. Main tasks: special reconnaissance, direct action, unconventional warfare.
  - Special Mission Unit (YPT - Ypatingosios paskirties tarnyba) in Vilnius. Main tasks: counter-terrorism, hostage rescue, special operations on land, water and air.
  - Combat Divers Service (KNT - Kovinių narų tarnyba) in Klaipėda. Main tasks: special operations in water, special reconnaissance, direct action.
  - Training and Combat Support Center (MKPC - Mokymo ir kovinės paramos centras) in Vilnius.

== History ==
=== Establishment ===
Soon after Lithuania re-established its independence from the Soviet Union on March 11, 1990, the need arose to form armed units. One of the first such units was Aukščiausiosios Tarybos Apsaugos Skyrius ("Supreme Council Security Section"). One of the main tasks of this unit was to protect the Lithuanian Parliament. In the following years, the Lithuanian army underwent various restructuring processes. After the reorganization of Kaunas Vytautas the Great motorized infantry battalion in 1995, the separate Vytautas the Great Jaeger Battalion (named after Lithuanian Grand Duke Vytautas the Great) was established, which would become one of the core units of Lithuanian Special Operations Forces.

Unofficial formation of the Special Purpose Service was started in 1995; after two more years the Service was officially established. After the 9/11 terror attacks, the main tasks of the Special Mission Unit became counter-terrorism, terrorist liquidation and hostage rescue. Members of the Special Mission Unit are called Žaliukai, meaning green-men and were named after the Forest Brothers.

After a 2007 reorganization, the Combat Divers Unit was established, whose main task became special underwater and surface operations.

Among the most secretive Lithuanian Special Operations Forces units are squadrons referred to by the codename Aitvaras (named after a traditional Lithuanian mythological spirit). The first public acknowledgment of the existence of Specialiųjų Operacijų Junginys (SOJ) "Aitvaras" (Special Operations Unit "Cockatrice") was in 2000, when Lithuanian sailors were captured in Guinea. Aitvaras carries out classified missions.

=== Operational history ===
The Lithuanian Special Operations Forces units have participated in a number of missions. From 2002 to 2004 squadrons of the Aitvaras were deployed to the "Enduring Freedom" operation in Afghanistan. Preparedness and execution of tasks by the SOF squadrons have been especially noted by the coalition partners.

From 2005 to 2006, the Lithuanian Special Operations Forces was on the operational half-year stand-by period in the NATO Response Force. Since the autumn 2007, SOF have taken part in the NATO-led International Security Assistance Force mission in southern Afghanistan. In 2008 soldiers of the SOF continued their service in the NATO Response Force.

In 2017, Lithuanian government has made a decision to send 20 soldiers group to the mission in Medditeranian EU Navfor Med including soldiers from navy forces, land forces and special operations forces.

== Gallery ==
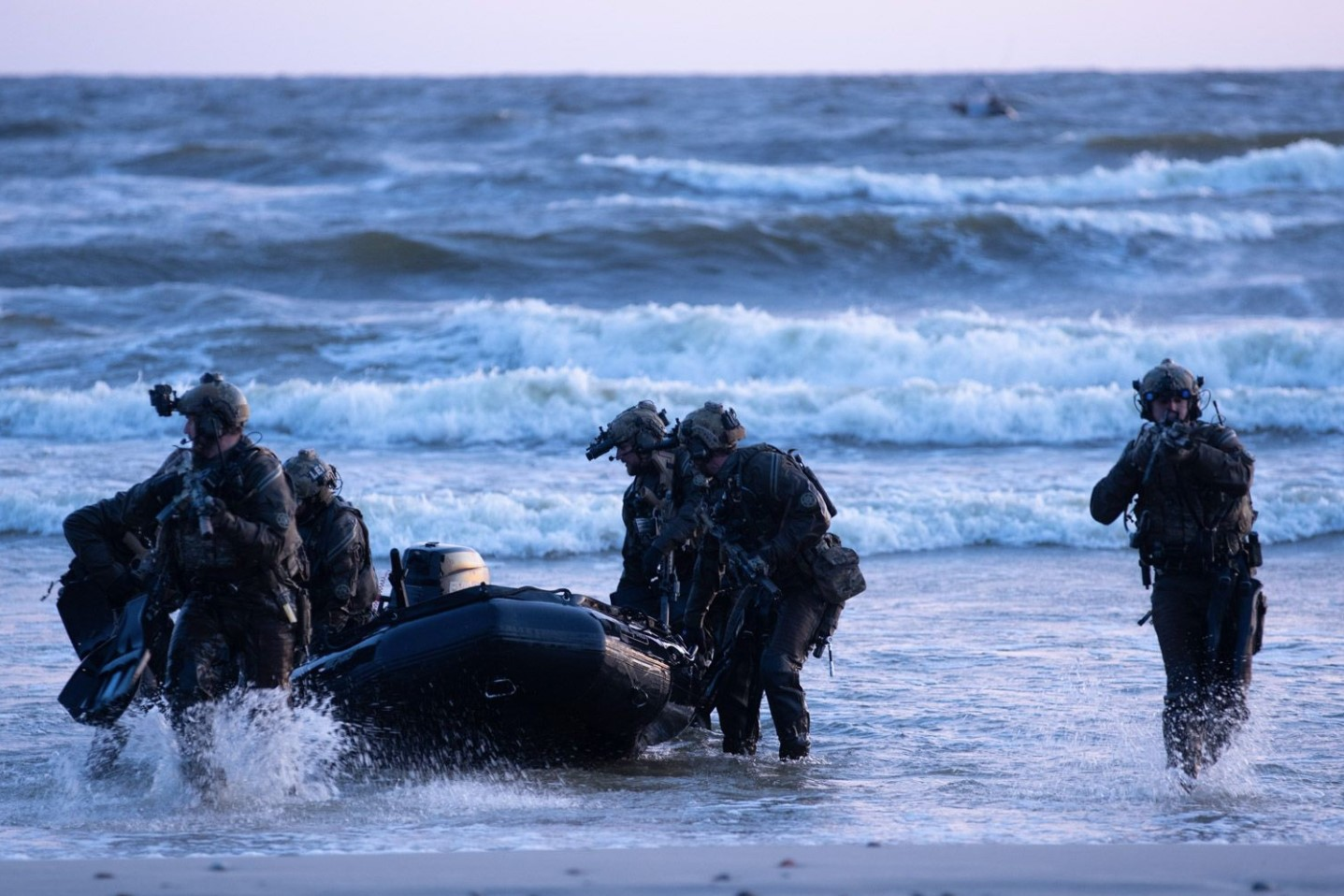
KNT Combat Divers

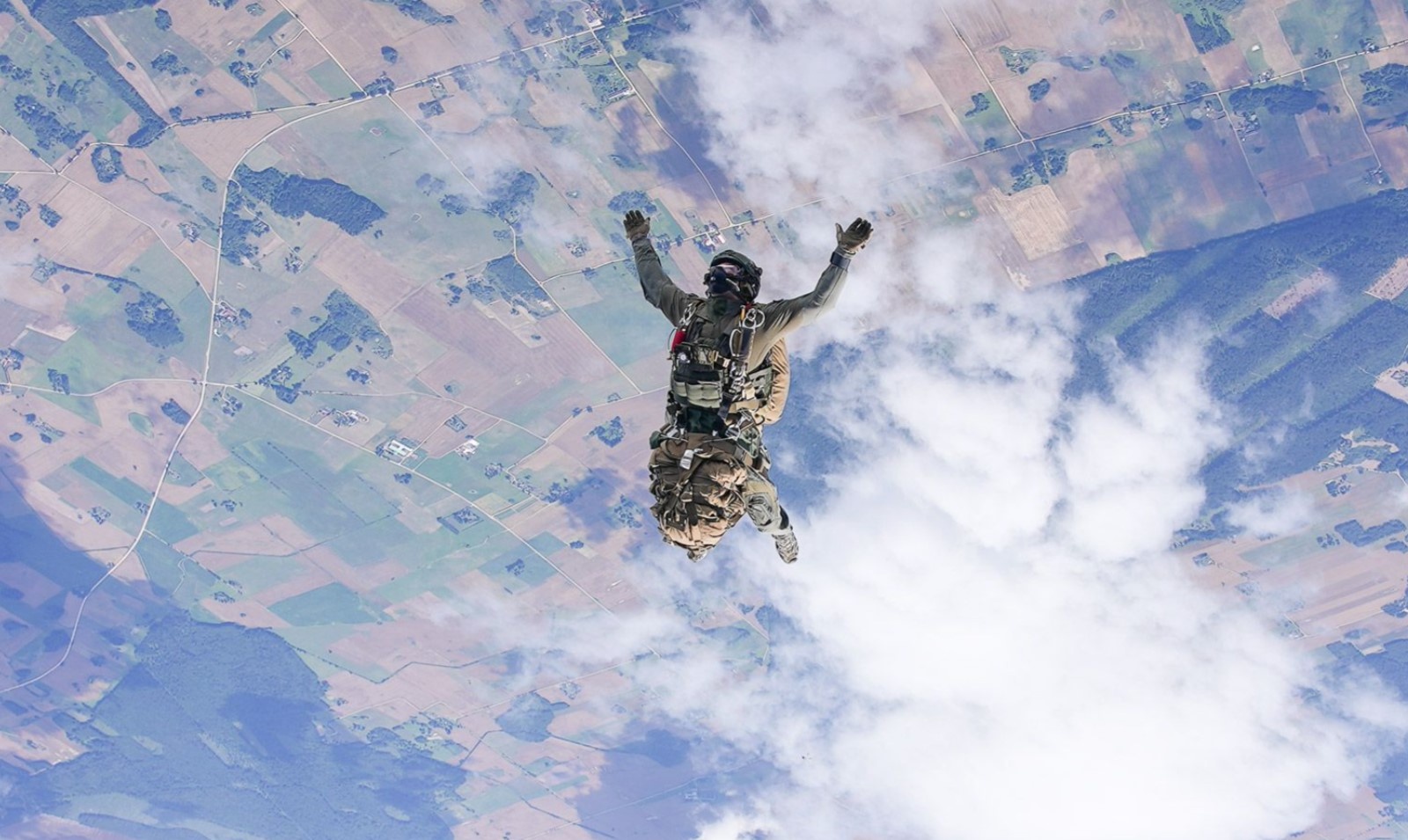
YPT HALO

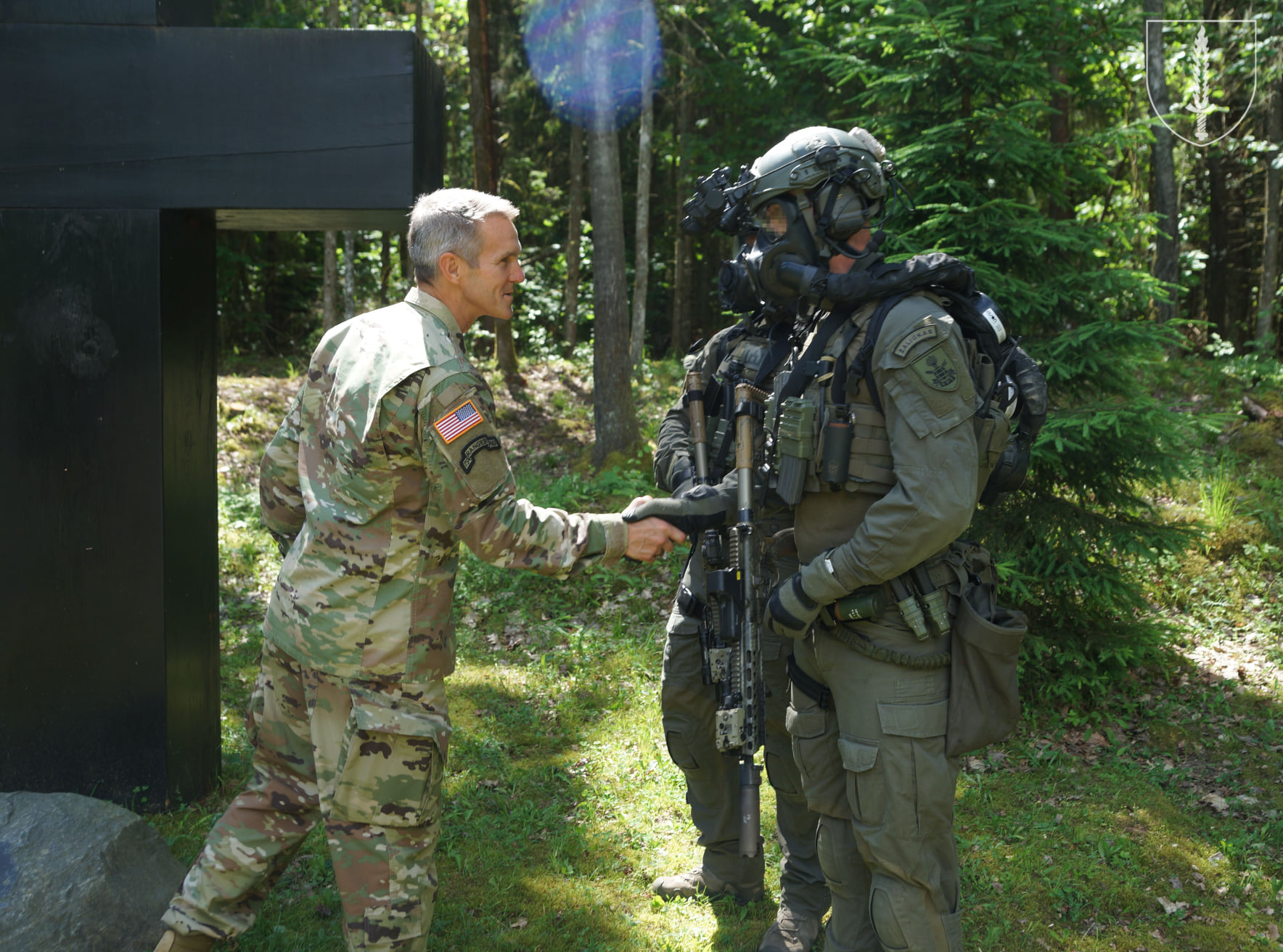
YPT troops meet with the US SOCOM

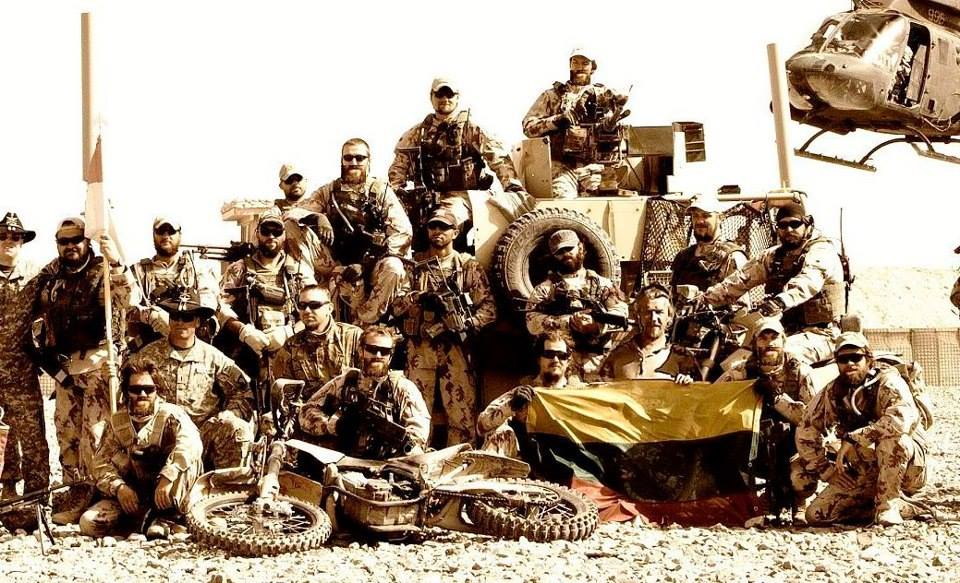
SOF in Afghanistan

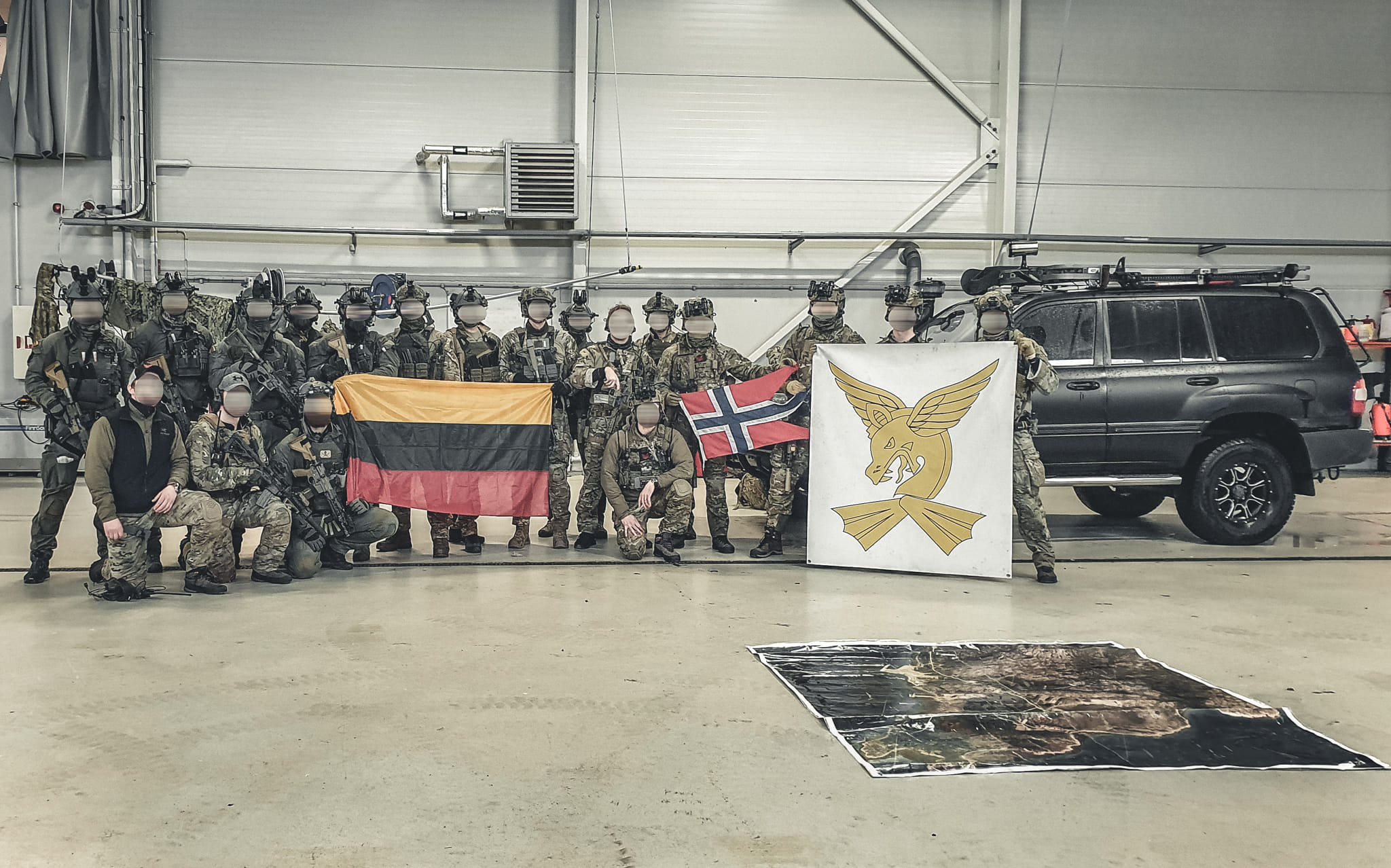
YPT with Norwegian MJK

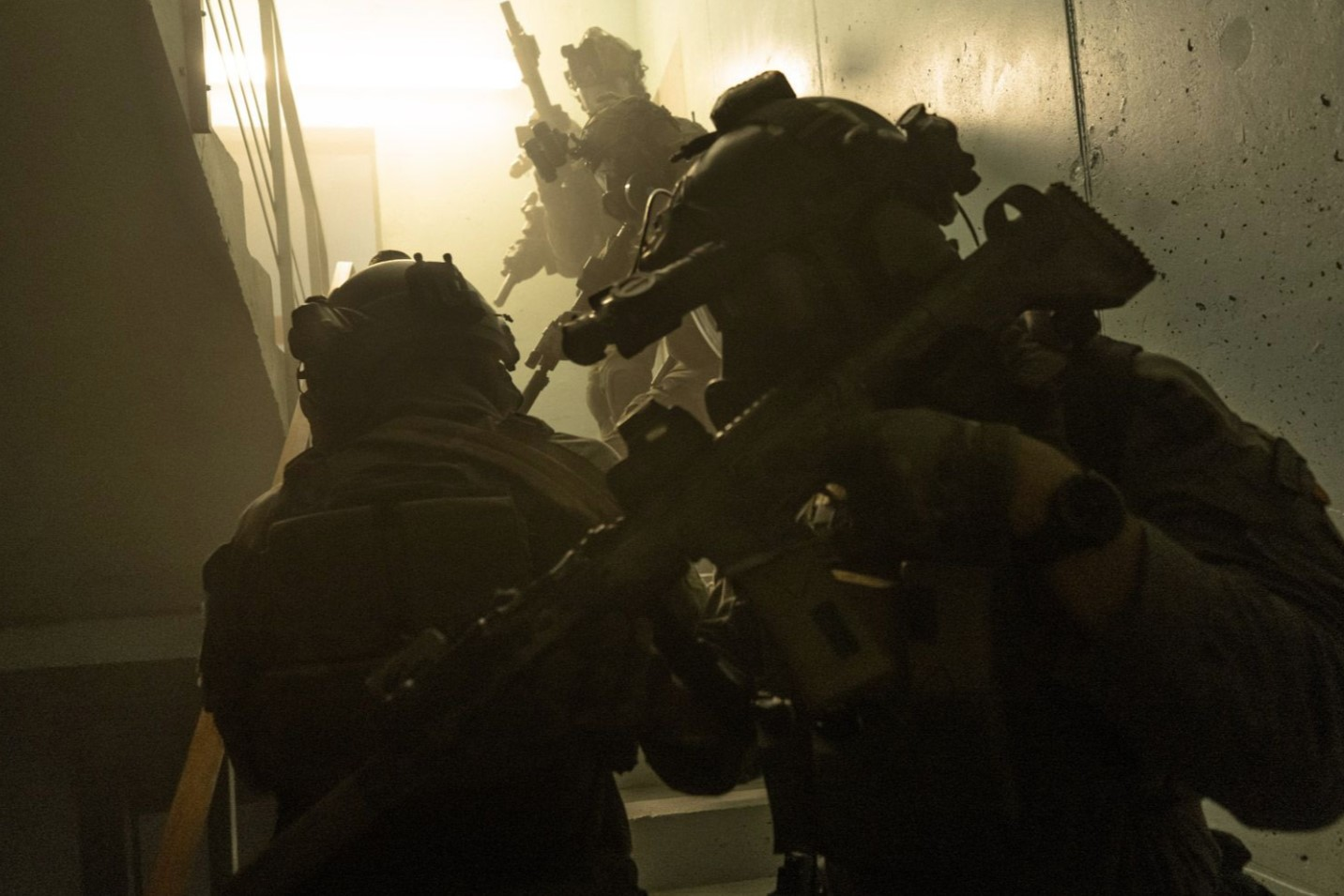
YPT Soldiers

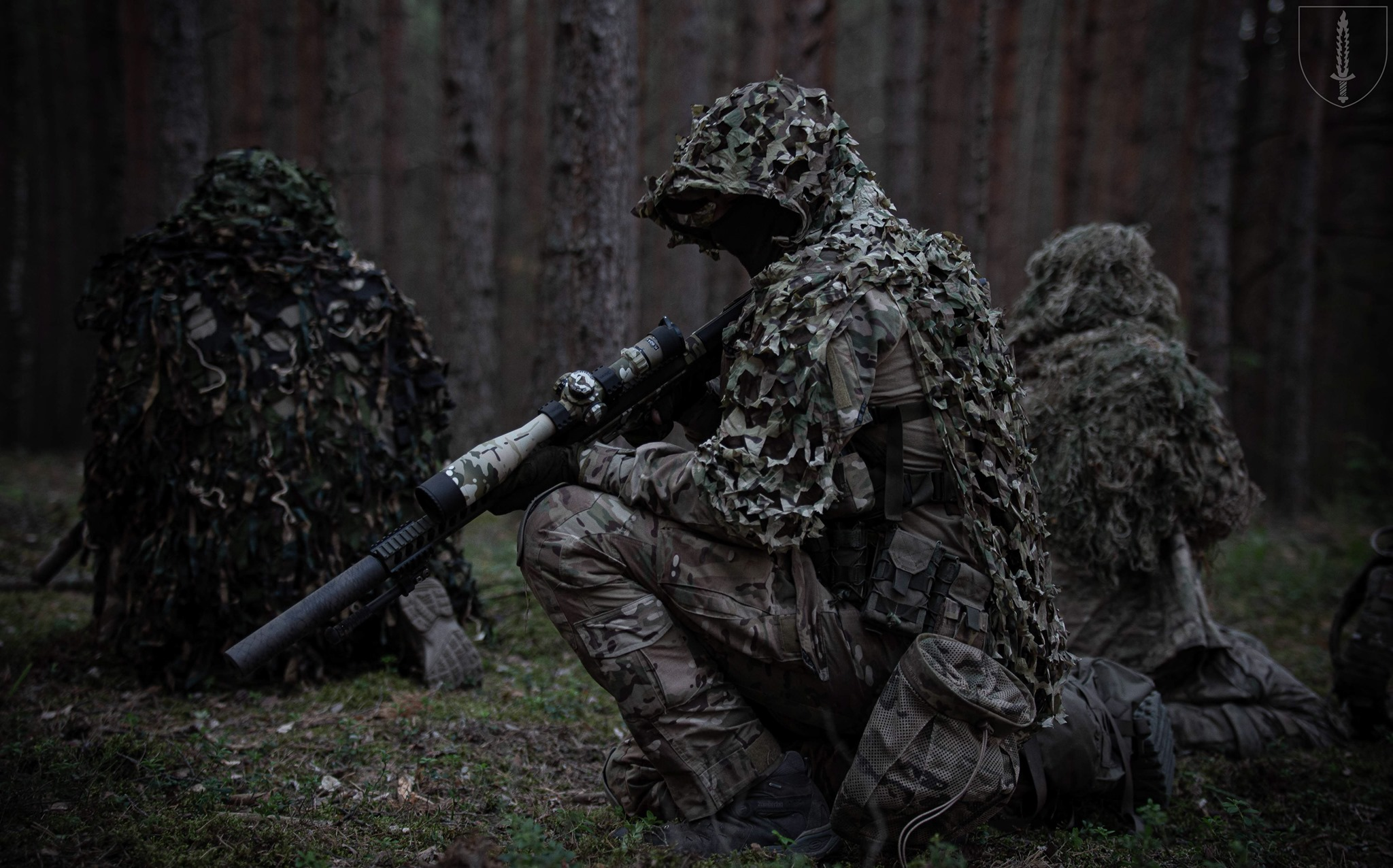
VDJB Snipers

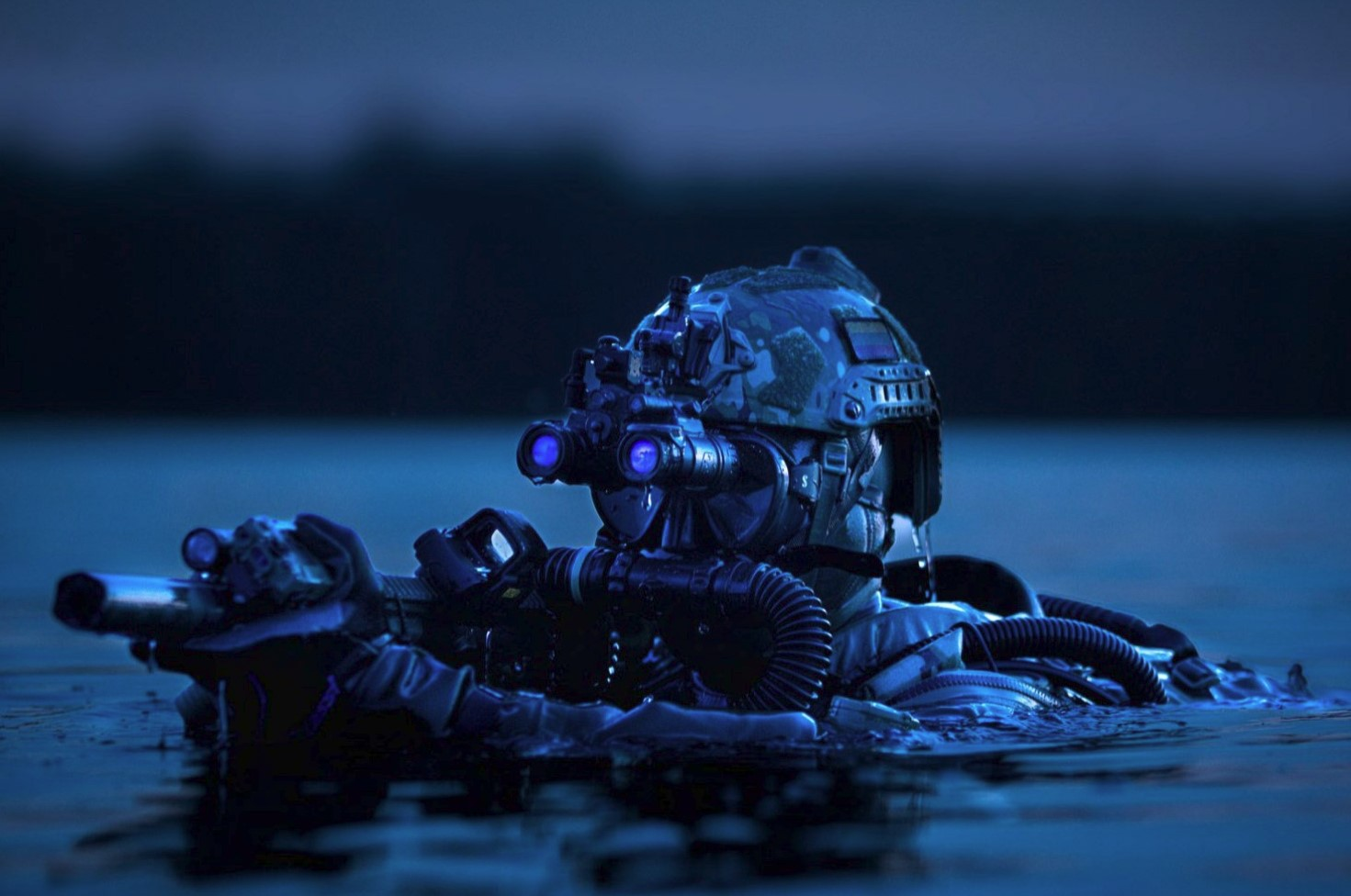
KNT Combat Diver

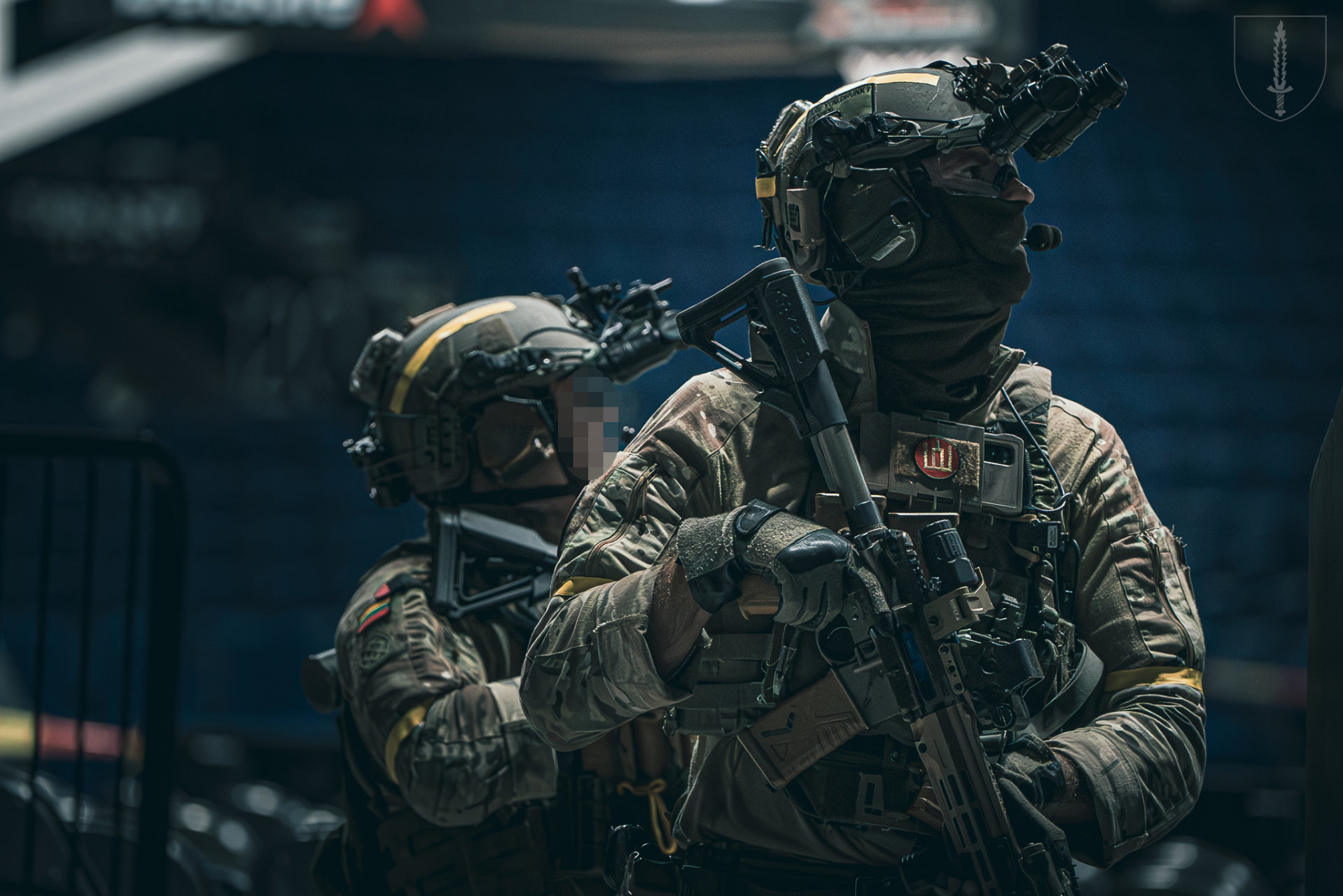
YPT soldiers in 2024

== See also ==
- Military of Lithuania
