= Granta X =

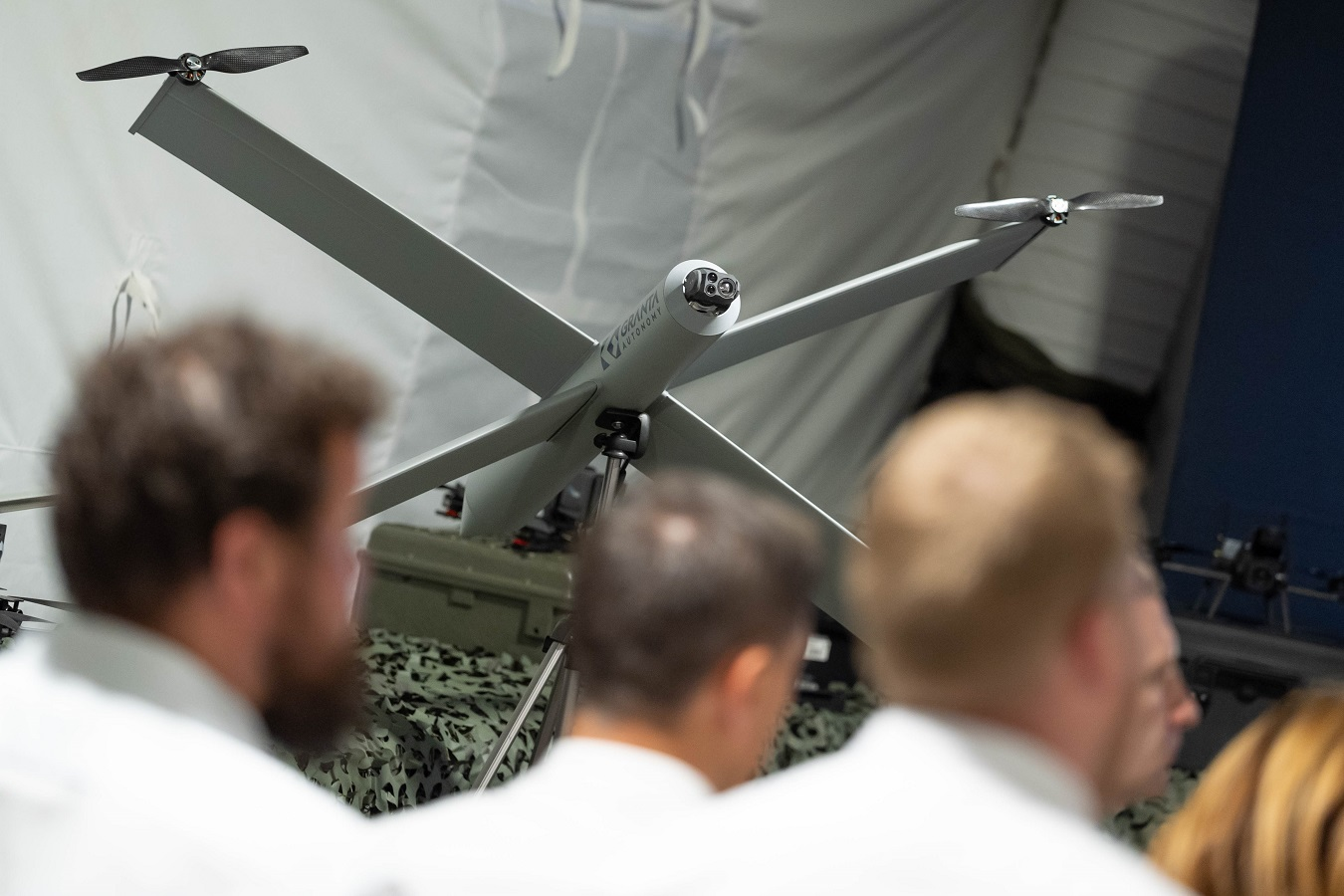
- 2024
- Type: Loitering missile
- Place of origin: Lithuania

Service history
- In service: 2025–present

Production history
- Manufacturer: Granta Autonomy
- Produced: 2024–present

Specifications
- Operational range: 60 km (37 mi)
- Guidance system: Autonomous; manual

Granta X or Granta X-Wing is a Lithuanian-developed vertical take-off and landing (VTOL) loitering munition developed by Granta Autonomy, a Lithuanian defense technology company.

== History ==
Granta Autonomy began developing the X-Wing in response to battlefield demands for precision loitering munitions that could be deployed by small infantry units without specialized launch equipment.

The project followed the company’s earlier UAV platforms, such as the Granta GA-10FPV-AI quadcopter loitering munition and the Hornet XR reconnaissance drone.

The X-Wing was publicly introduced on 28 May 2025 at the IDET 2025 international defense exhibition in Brno, Czech Republic, as a prototype undergoing final evaluation before potential mass production.

== Design ==
Designed for precision strike missions, the X-Wing combines quadcopter-style vertical launch with efficient fixed-wing flight, offering front-line units a portable, modular, and easy-to-deploy loitering munition system.

Designed with cost-effective mass production in mind, the X-Wing can fly up to 50 kilometers (31 miles) with artificial intelligence equipped for autonomous flights. The drone is also loaded with a warhead for eliminating different types of targets.

== Users ==
- Lithuania
  - Lithuanian Armed Forces
- Ukraine
  - Armed Forces of Ukraine

== See also ==
- RSI Europe Špokas
- UDS Partisan Recon
