= Granta GA-10FPV-AI =

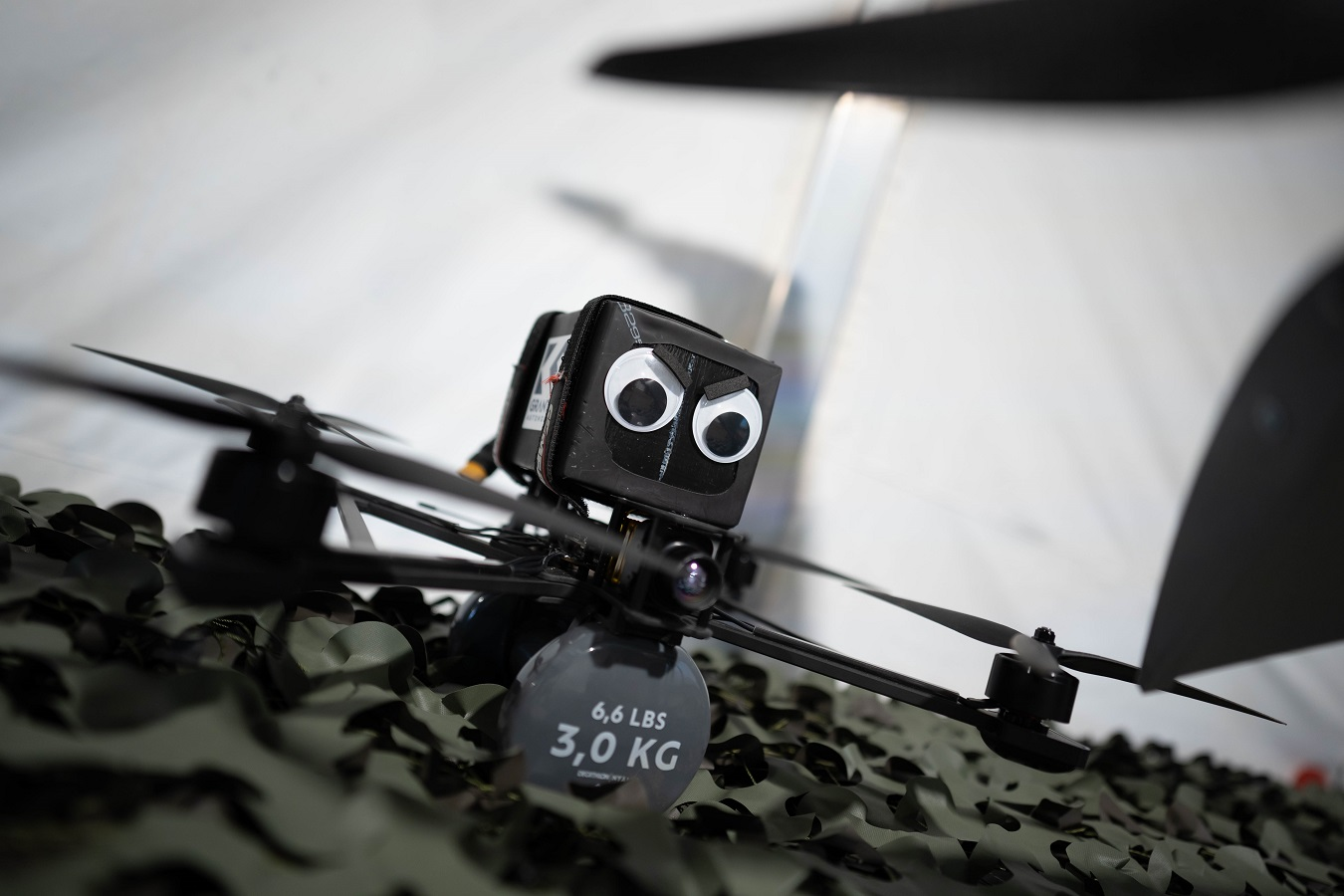
- 2024
- Type: Loitering missile
- Place of origin: Lithuania

Service history
- In service: 2024–present
- Wars: Russian invasion of Ukraine

Production history
- Manufacturer: Granta Autonomy
- Produced: 2024–present

Specifications
- Mass: 3 kg (6.6 lb)
- Operational range: 20 km (12 mi)
- Maximum speed: 150 km/h (93 mph)
- Guidance system: Autonomous; manual

Granta GA-10FPV-AI is a Lithuanian-developed first-person view (FPV) quadcopter drone designed for military applications, including reconnaissance and loitering munition roles.

== Development and design ==
Founded in 2015 by former Lithuanian military engineers Gediminas Guoba and Laurynas Litvinas, Granta Autonomy specializes in unmanned aerial systems and related technologies.

The GA-10FPV-AI was developed as part of Lithuania's broader initiative to enhance its defense capabilities and support allied nations.

== Design ==
The Granta GA-10FPV-AI features vertical take-off and landing (VTOL) capabilities, allowing for operation in confined spaces and diverse terrains.

The Granta GA-10FPV-AI is equipped with artificial intelligence (AI) to enable autonomous flight, even in environments where GPS signals are unavailable or jamming is present.

== Deployment ==
In September 2024, Granta Autonomy secured a €1 million contract with the Lithuanian Ministry of National Defence to supply the GA-10FPV-AI drones.

This contract is part of a larger €8 million defense procurement initiative involving several Lithuanian drone manufacturers.

Under this agreement, over 2,300 drones are to be delivered to the Lithuanian military, with nearly 5,000 units allocated to Ukraine.

The GA-10FPV-AI drones have been tested in real-world combat scenarios, particularly in Ukraine, where they have demonstrated effectiveness in electronic warfare environments.

== Users ==
- Lithuania
  - Lithuanian Armed Forces
- Ukraine
  - Armed Forces of Ukraine

== See also ==
- Granta Hornet
- RSI Europe Špokas
- UDS Partisan Recon
- Granta X
