= RSI Europe Špokas =

RSI Europe Špokas/Shpak
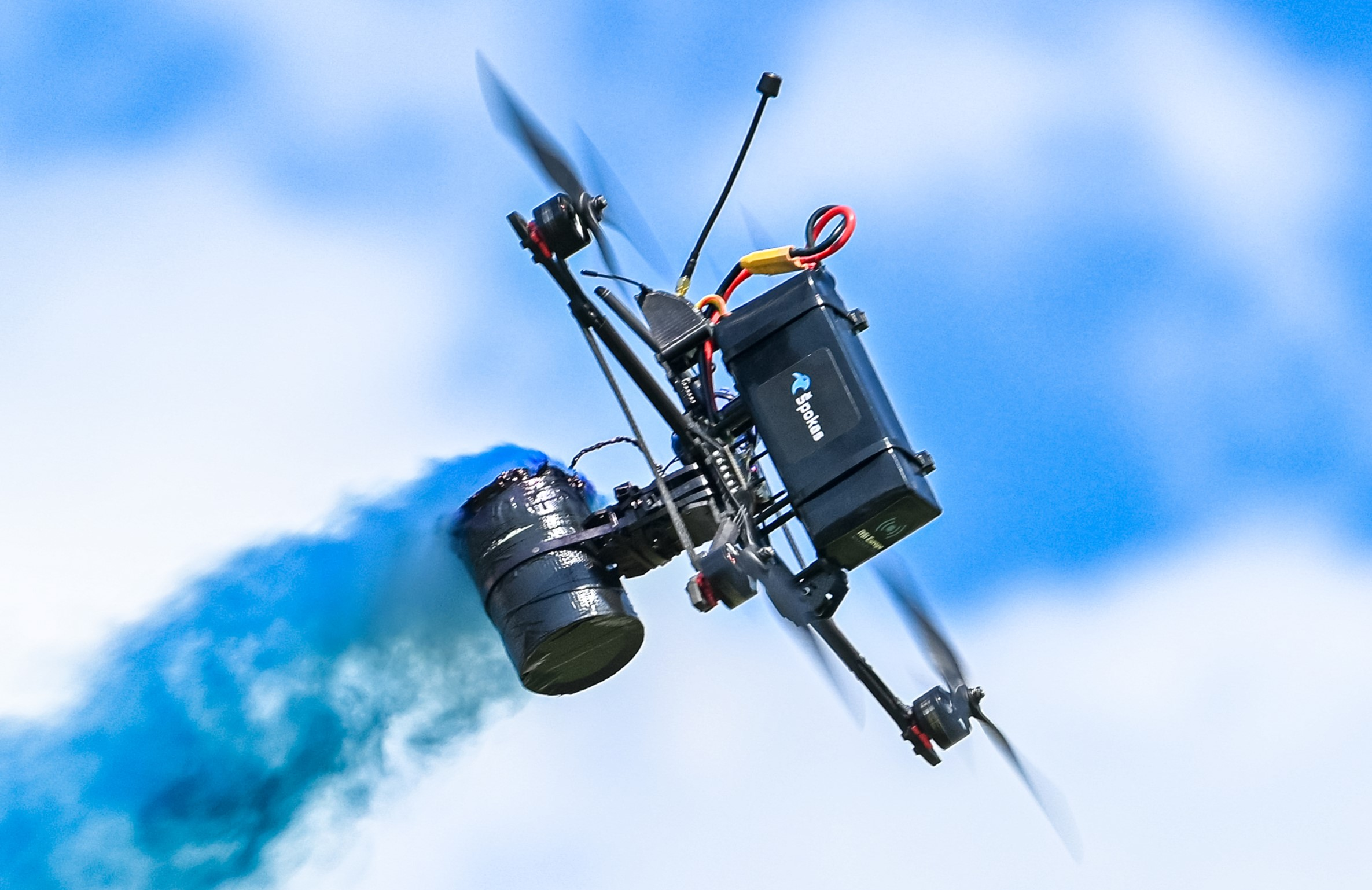
- Shpak drone in flight, 2024
- Type: Loitering missile
- Place of origin: Lithuania

Service history
- In service: 2024–present
- Wars: Russian invasion of Ukraine

Production history
- Manufacturer: RSI Europe
- Produced: 2024–present

Specifications
- Mass: 2 kg (4.4 lb)
- Length: 25 cm (9.8 in)
- Operational range: 20 km (12 mi)
- Maximum speed: 150 km/h (93 mph)
- Guidance system: Autonomous; manual

RSI Europe Špokas or RSI Europe Shpak is a Lithuanian-developed first-person view (FPV) quadcopter drone designed for military applications, particularly as a loitering munition.

== Development ==
RSI Europe, a Lithuanian company specializing in remotely controlled systems for the defense sector, developed the Špokas in response to the evolving demands of modern warfare.

=== Naming ===
The drone is named after the Lithuanian word "špokas," meaning "starling," symbolizing a shared cultural heritage among Lithuania, Poland, and Ukraine. The name reflects the historical ties between these nations and their collective defense efforts against eastern aggressors.

=== Funding ===
In 2024, the Lithuanian National Development Bank ILTE provided RSI Europe with a €4 million loan to support the development and production of advanced defense technologies, including the Špokas FPV drone.

The funding aims to enhance manufacturing capacity, accelerate delivery to allied forces such as Ukraine, and strengthen Lithuania's position as a regional hub for defense innovation.

== Design ==
The Špokas is designed for precision strikes on enemy targets, offering military forces a versatile and effective tool for modern combat scenarios.

The Špokas system consists of the drone, FPV goggles, a controller, a ground control station, and either a stationary antenna array or an optional drone-mounted retransmission kit.

RSI Europe provides the system with supporting services, including FPV operator training, warranty service, and integration into command and control (C2) systems.

== Deployment ==
In October 2024, RSI Europe delivered the first batch of Špokas drones to Ukraine under a $4 million contract.

This delivery marked a significant step in enhancing Ukraine's drone capabilities amidst ongoing conflicts. The drones have been integrated into Ukrainian operations, providing advanced strike capabilities against adversary targets.

In 2026, RSI Europe completed its largest contract to date, delivering 9,500 Shpak FPV drones in three variants along with RISE-1 remote detonation systems, most of which were sent to Ukraine.

Additionally, RSI Europe has been training Lithuanian Armed Forces, the Belgian Armed forces and the Bundeswehr personnel in FPV drone operations since June 2024, ensuring effective utilization of the Špokas in various military applications.

== Users ==
- Lithuania
  - Lithuanian Armed Forces
- Ukraine
  - Armed Forces of Ukraine

== See also ==
- Granta Hornet
- Granta GA-10FPV-AI
- UDS Partisan Recon
- Granta X
