= List of equipment of the Republic of China Air Force =

Below is a list of equipment used by the Republic of China Air Force (commonly known as the Taiwanese Air Force).

== Fixed wing aircraft ==
Aircraft	Origin	Type	Variant	In service	Notes
Fighter aircraft
AIDC F-CK-1	Taiwan	Multirole	F-CK-1C	103	upgraded to the 1C variant
AIDC F-CK-1	Taiwan	Conversion trainer	F-CK-1D	26	upgraded to the 1D variant
Dassault Mirage 2000	France	Multirole	2000-5EI	43	1 crashed in 2024
Dassault Mirage 2000	France	Conversion trainer	2000-5DI	9	
Lockheed Martin F-16V Viper	United States	Multirole	F-16A Block 72	111	113 aircraft upgraded, 2 crashed
Lockheed Martin F-16V Viper	United States	Multirole	F-16C Block 70	5	54 on order, delivery expected to commence in 2026
Lockheed Martin F-16V Viper	United States	Conversion trainer	F-16B Block 72	27	F-16B Block 20 upgraded to Block 72 (F-16V)
Lockheed Martin F-16V Viper	United States	Conversion trainer	F-16D Block 70	1	additional 9 on order, first delivered on 29 March 2025
AEW&C
Grumman E-2 Hawkeye	United States	AEW&C	E-2K	6	
Electronic-warfare
Lockheed C-130 Hercules	United States	Transport	C-130HE	1	Implement ELINT duty
Maritime patrol
Lockheed P-3 Orion	United States	ASW / Patrol	P-3C	12	
Transport
Fokker 50	Netherlands	VIP transport	F27 Mk.50	3	
Boeing 737	United States	VIP transport	737-8AR	1	Air Force 3701
Beech 1900	United States	Surveillance	1900C-1	2	also provides multi engine training
Lockheed C-130 Hercules	United States	Transport	C-130H	19	
Trainer aircraft
AIDC T-5	Taiwan	Jet trainer		52	14 on order – AT-3 / F-5 replacement. 1 lost in 2025
Beechcraft T-34 Mentor	United States	Basic trainer	T-34C	34	
UAV
NCSIST Teng Yun	Taiwan	UCAV		3	
General Atomics MQ-9	United States	ASW / UCAV	MQ-9B SkyGuardian	2	2 on order, deliveries to be completed by August 11, 2027

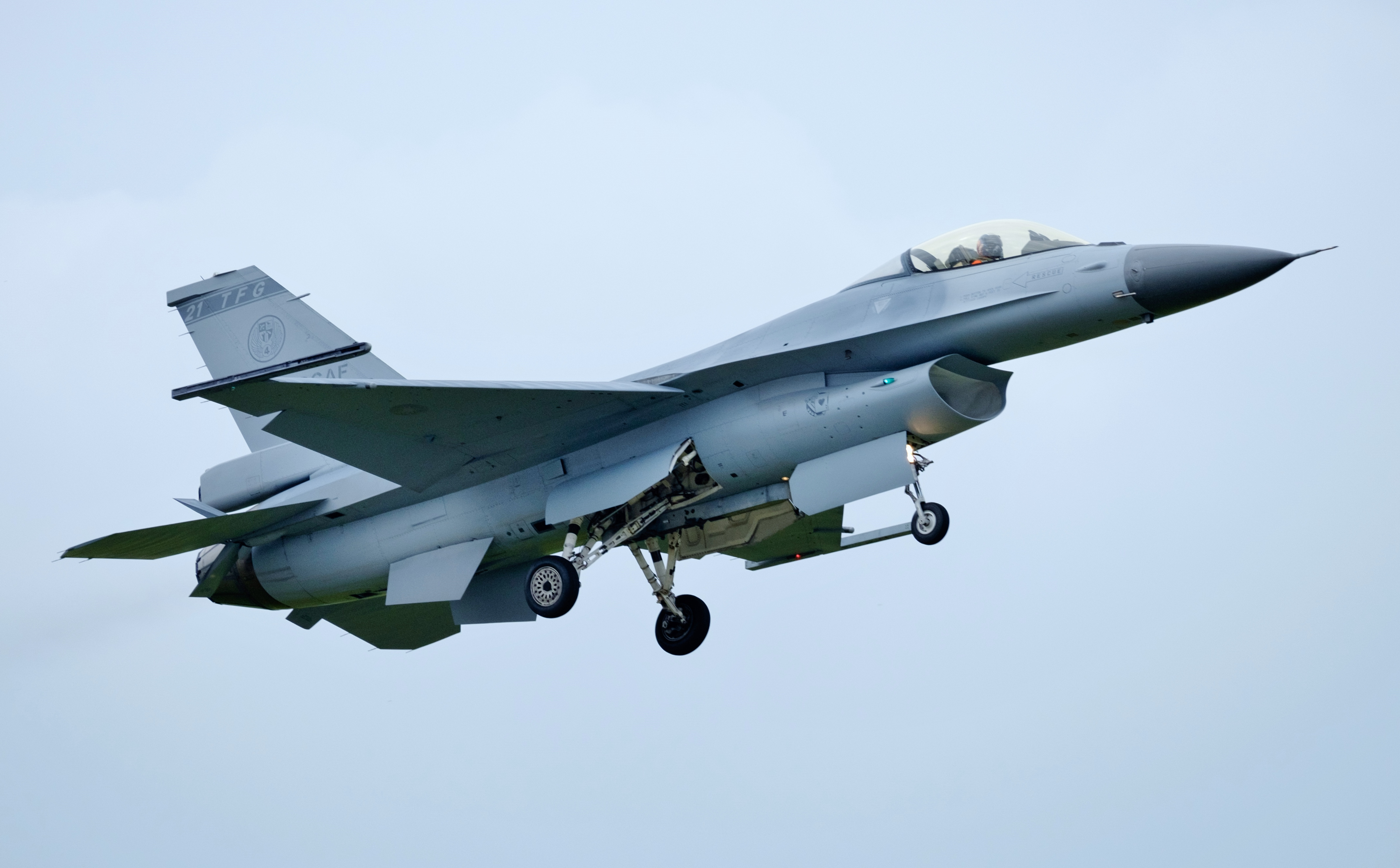
A ROCAF F-16A on a demonstration flight

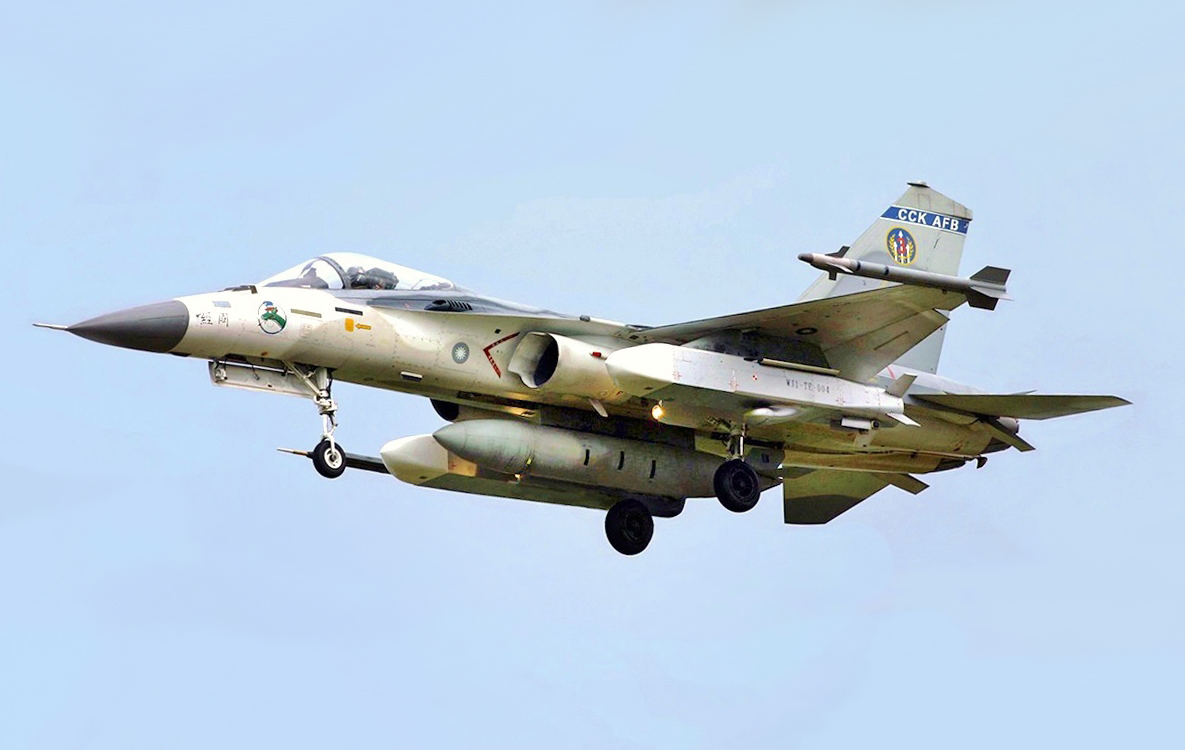
AIDC F-CK-1 Ching-kuo armed with Sky Sword I and Wan Chien

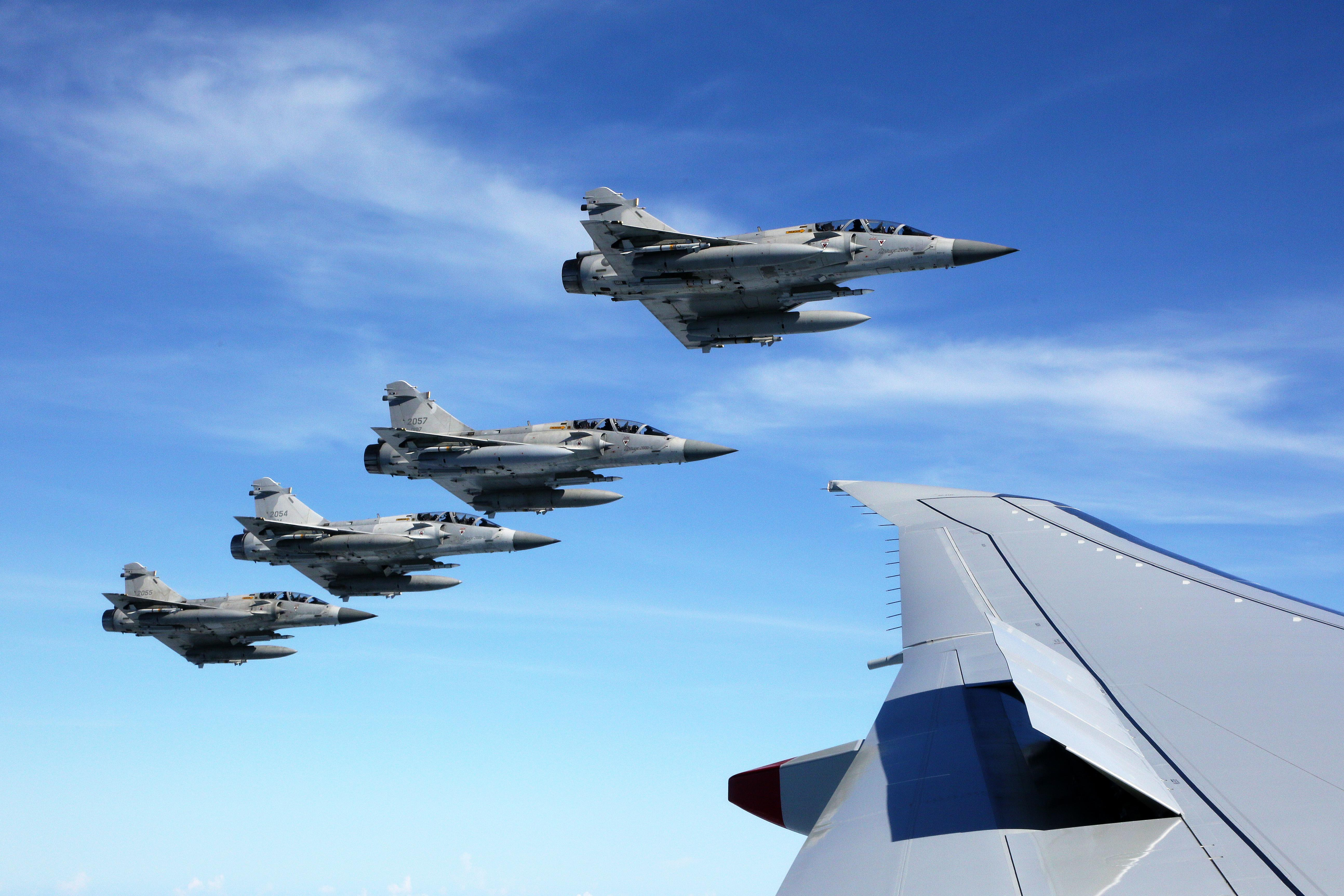
ROCAF Dassault Mirage 2000s in 2016

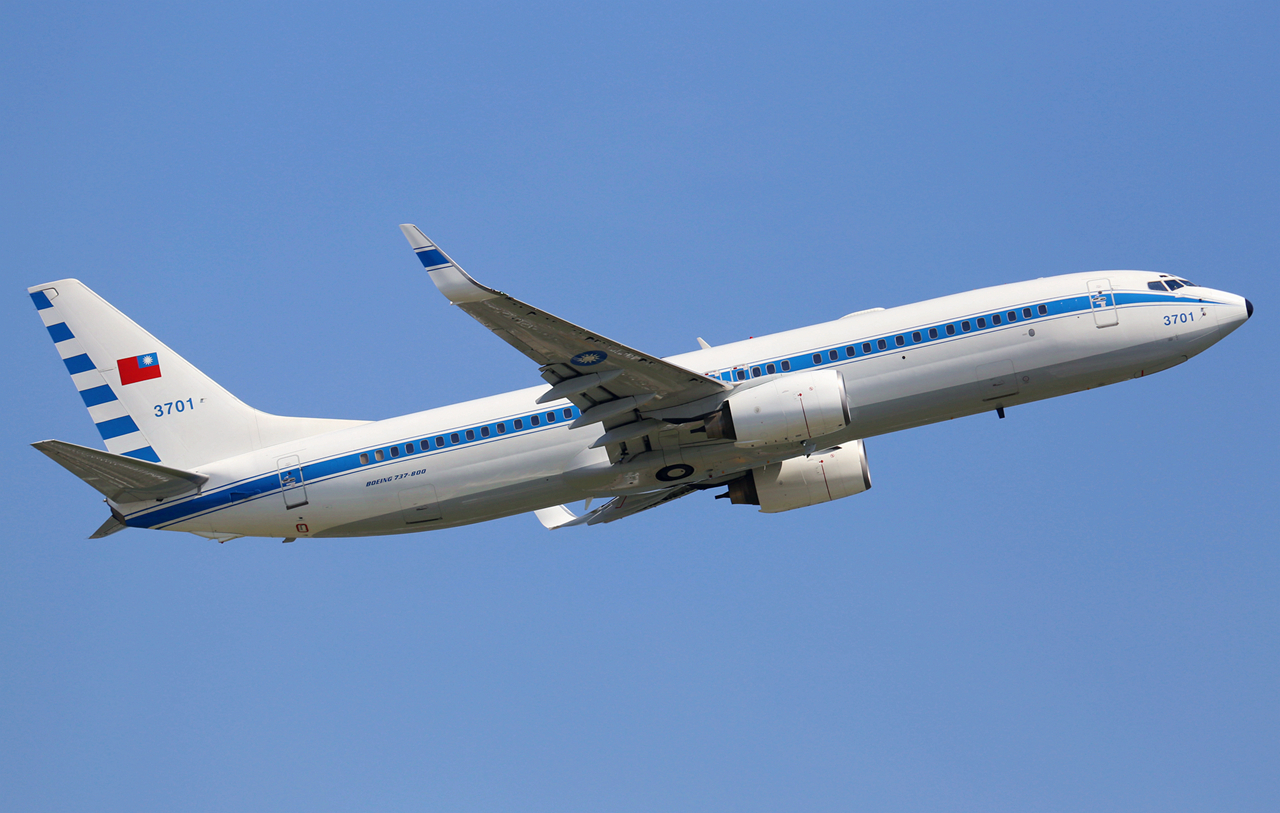
Boeing 737-800 Presidential Jet at Songshan Airport

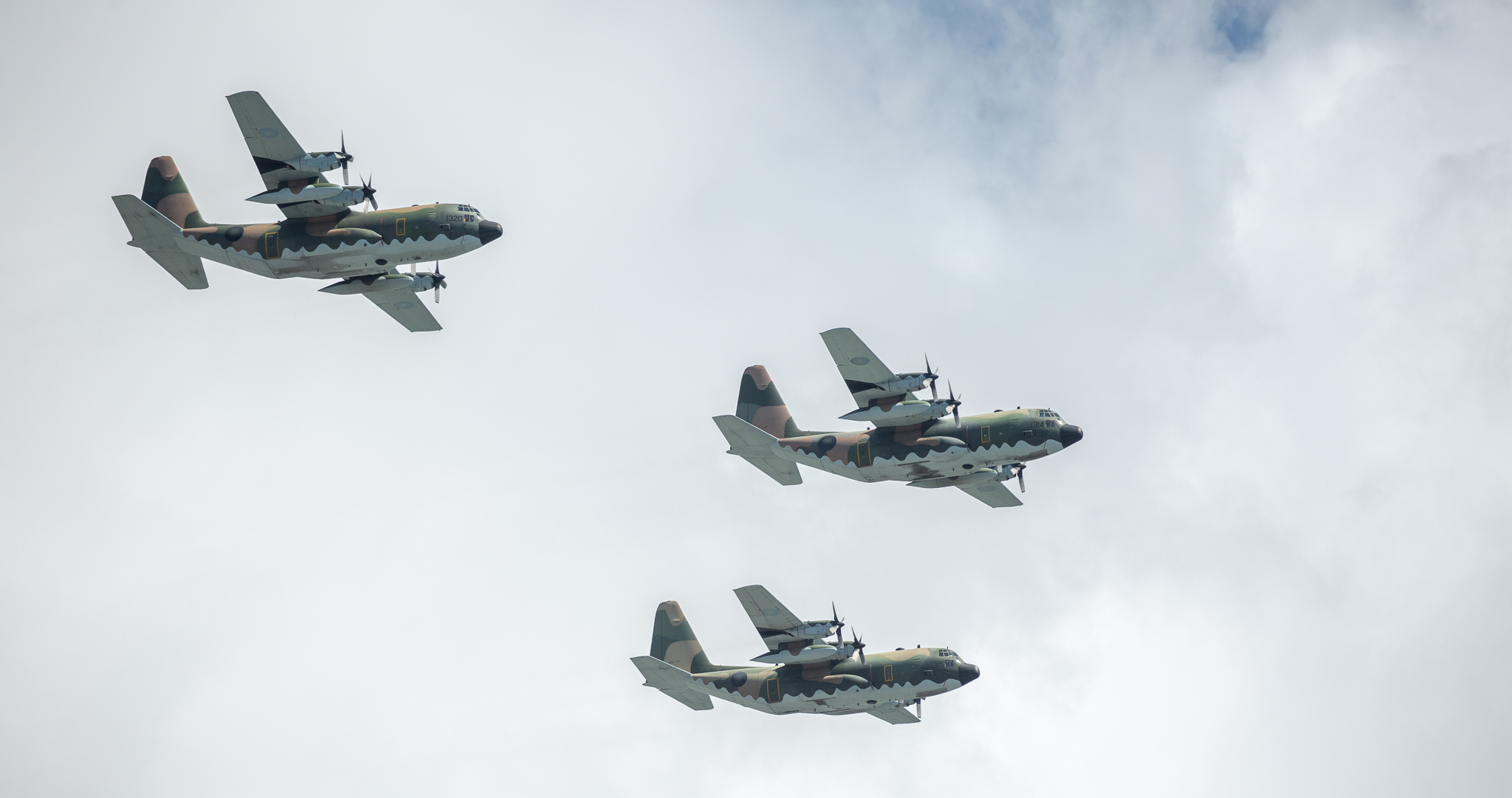
ROCAF C-130Hs in 2021

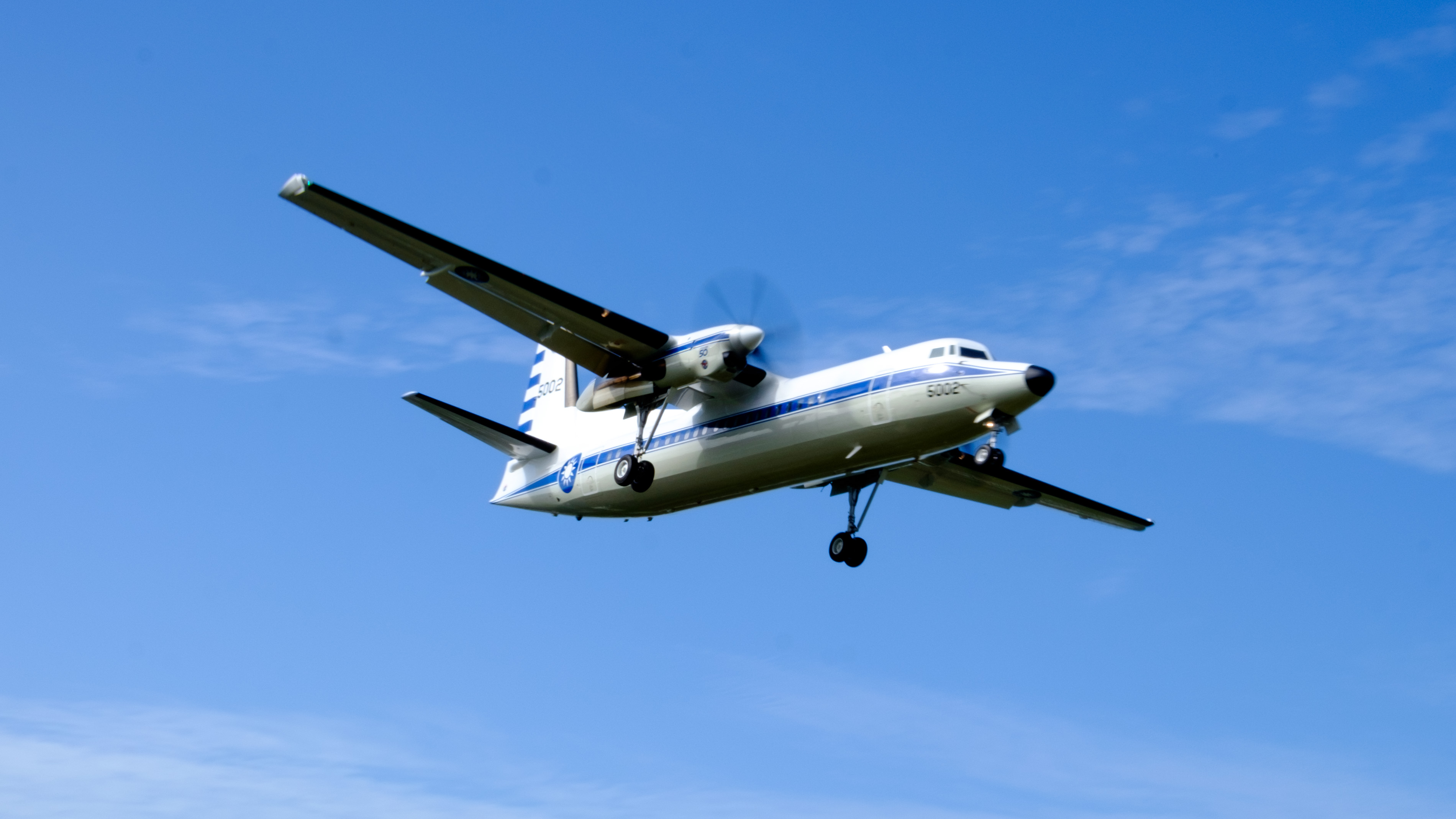
ROCAF Fokker 50 at Songshan Airport

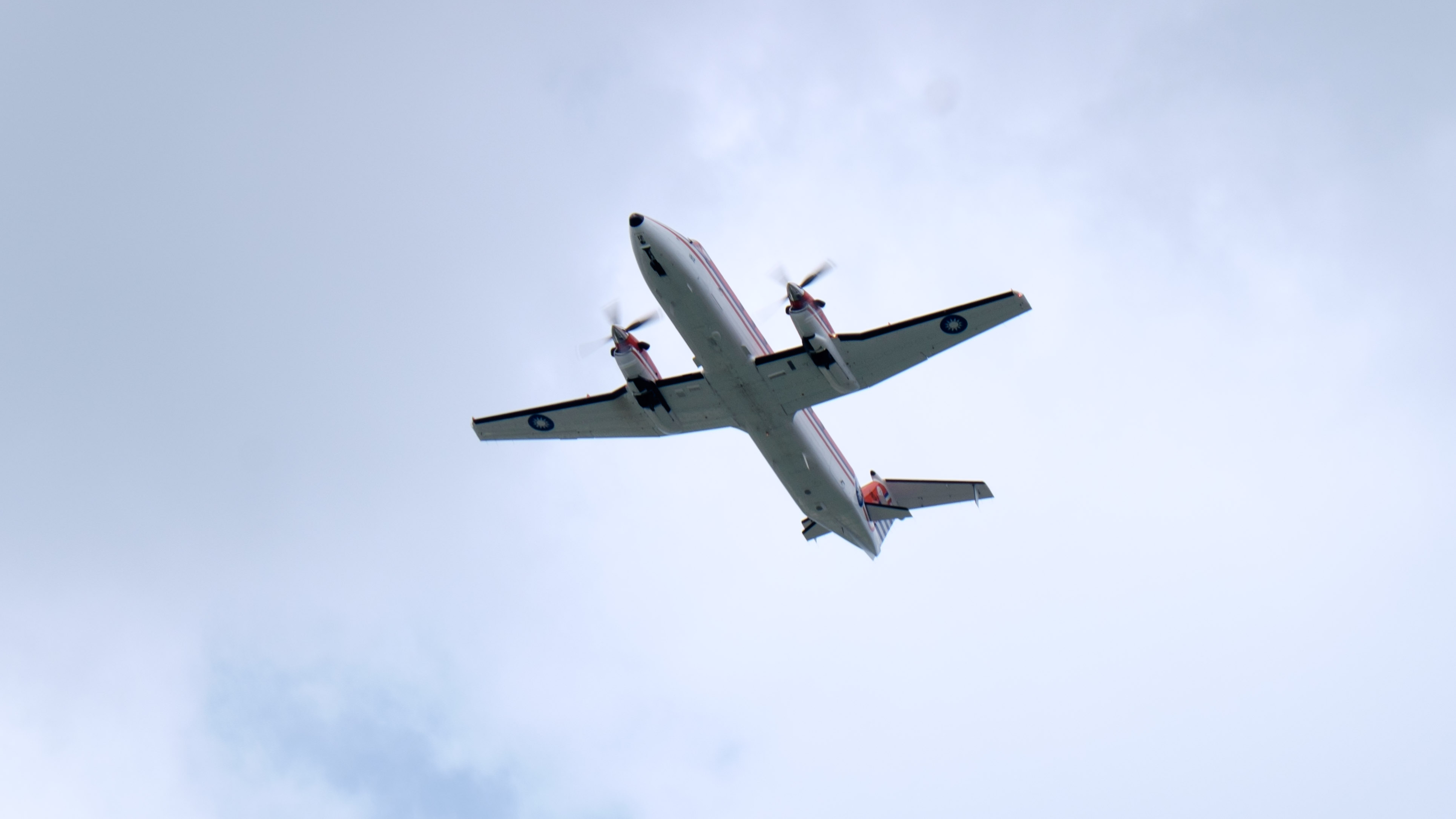
ROCAF Beechcraft 1900 in 2015

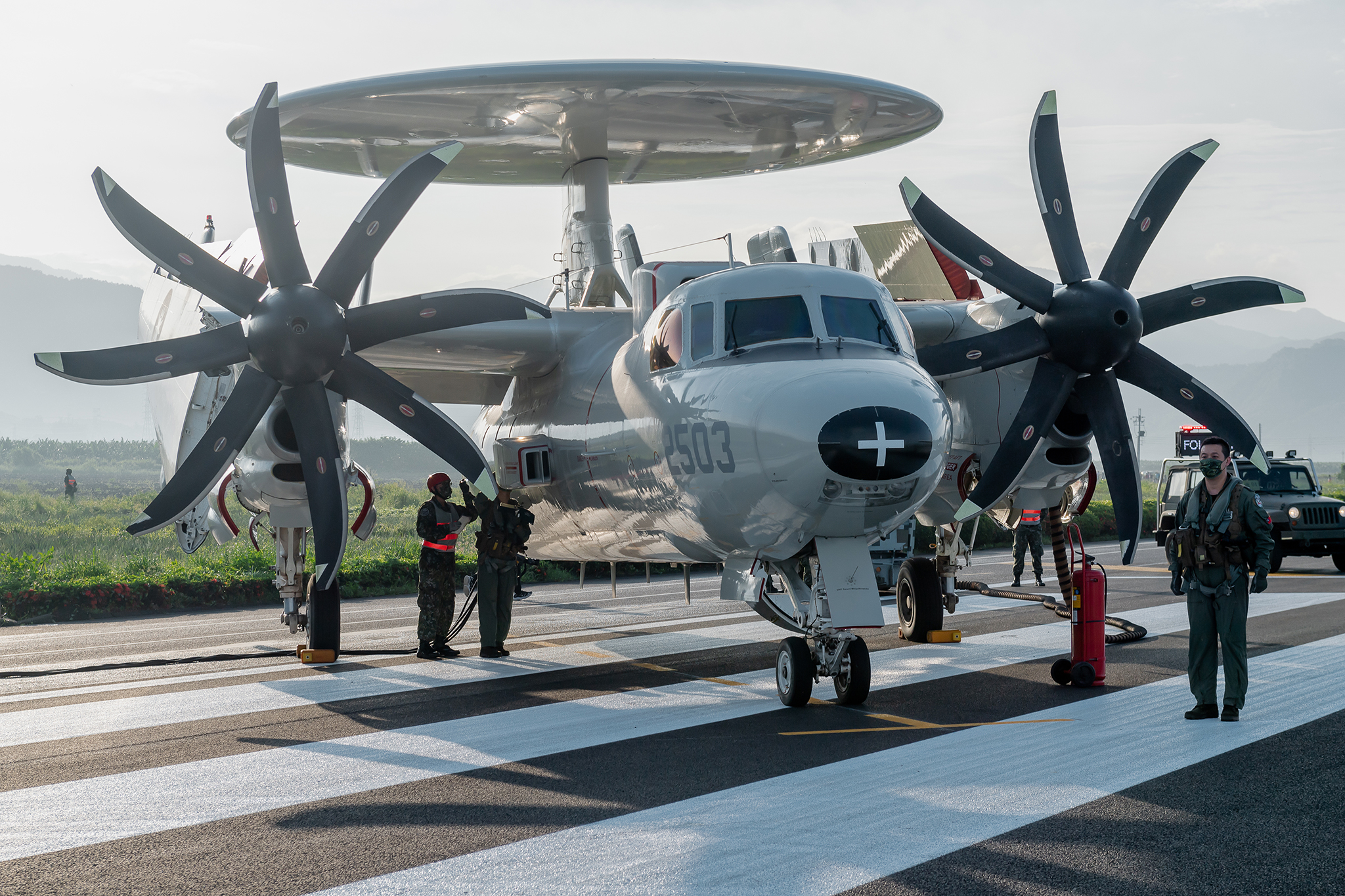
ROCAF Grumman E-2 Hawkeye on a highway strip in 2021

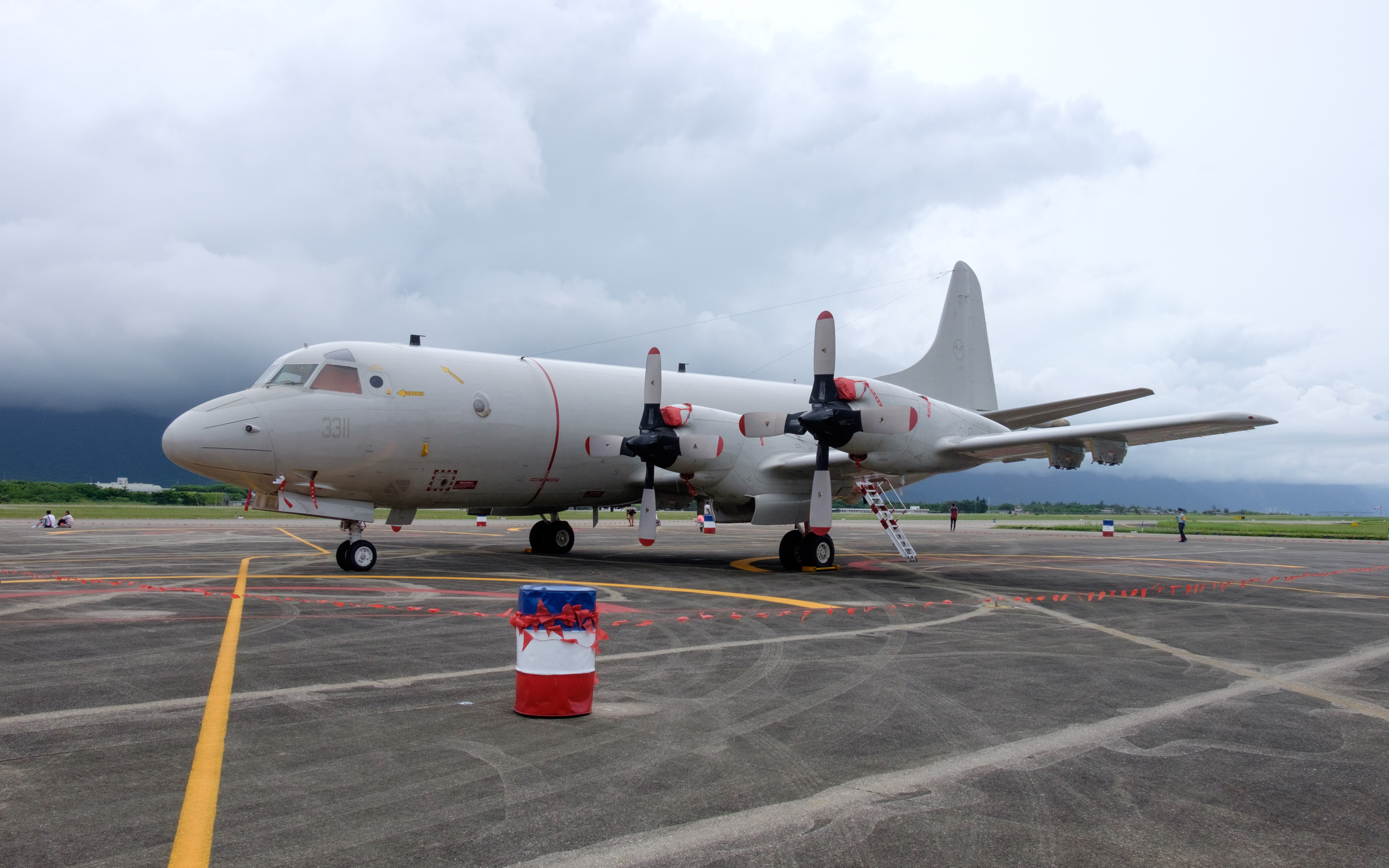
Lockheed P-3 Orion in 2016

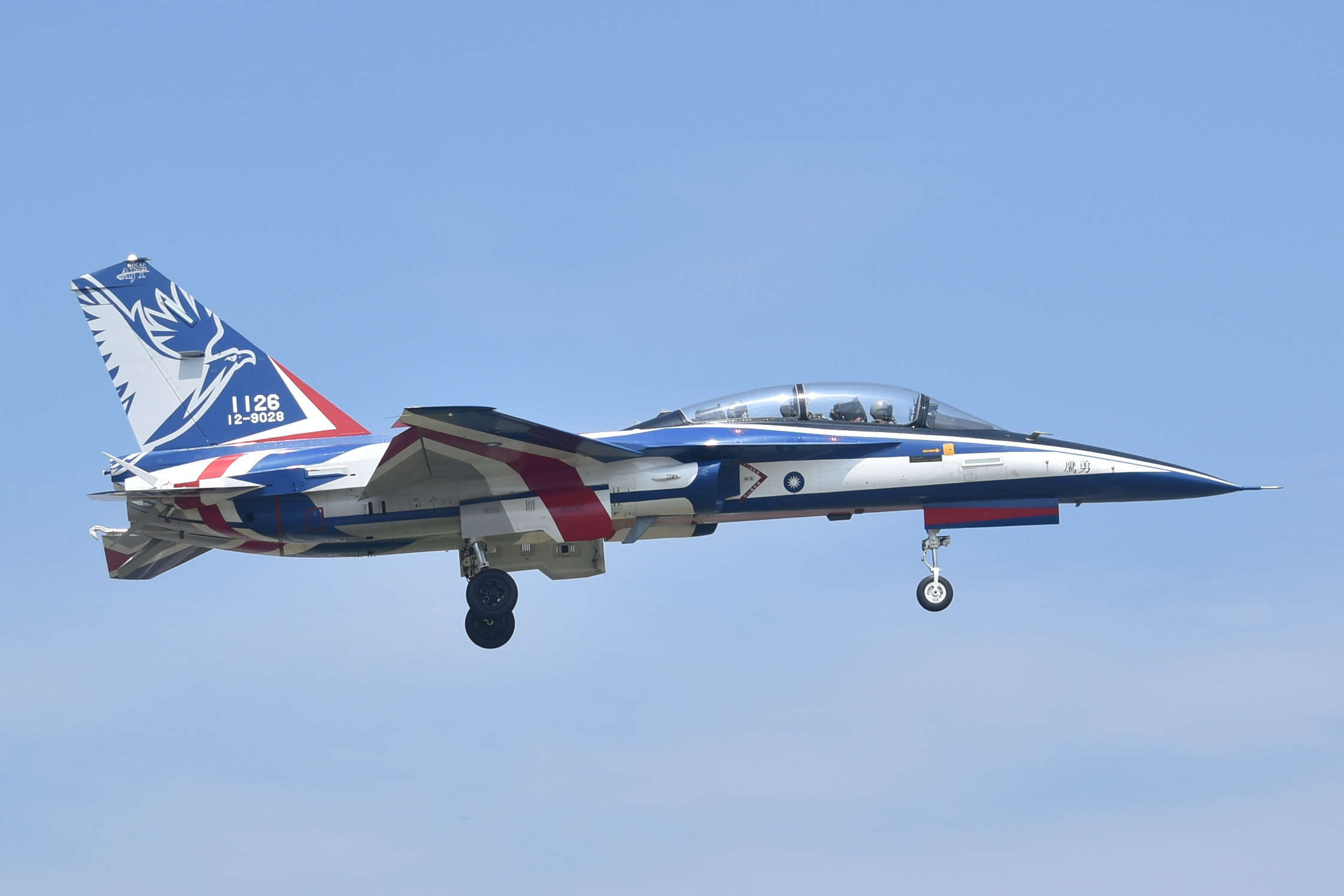
ROCAF AIDC T-5 in 2025

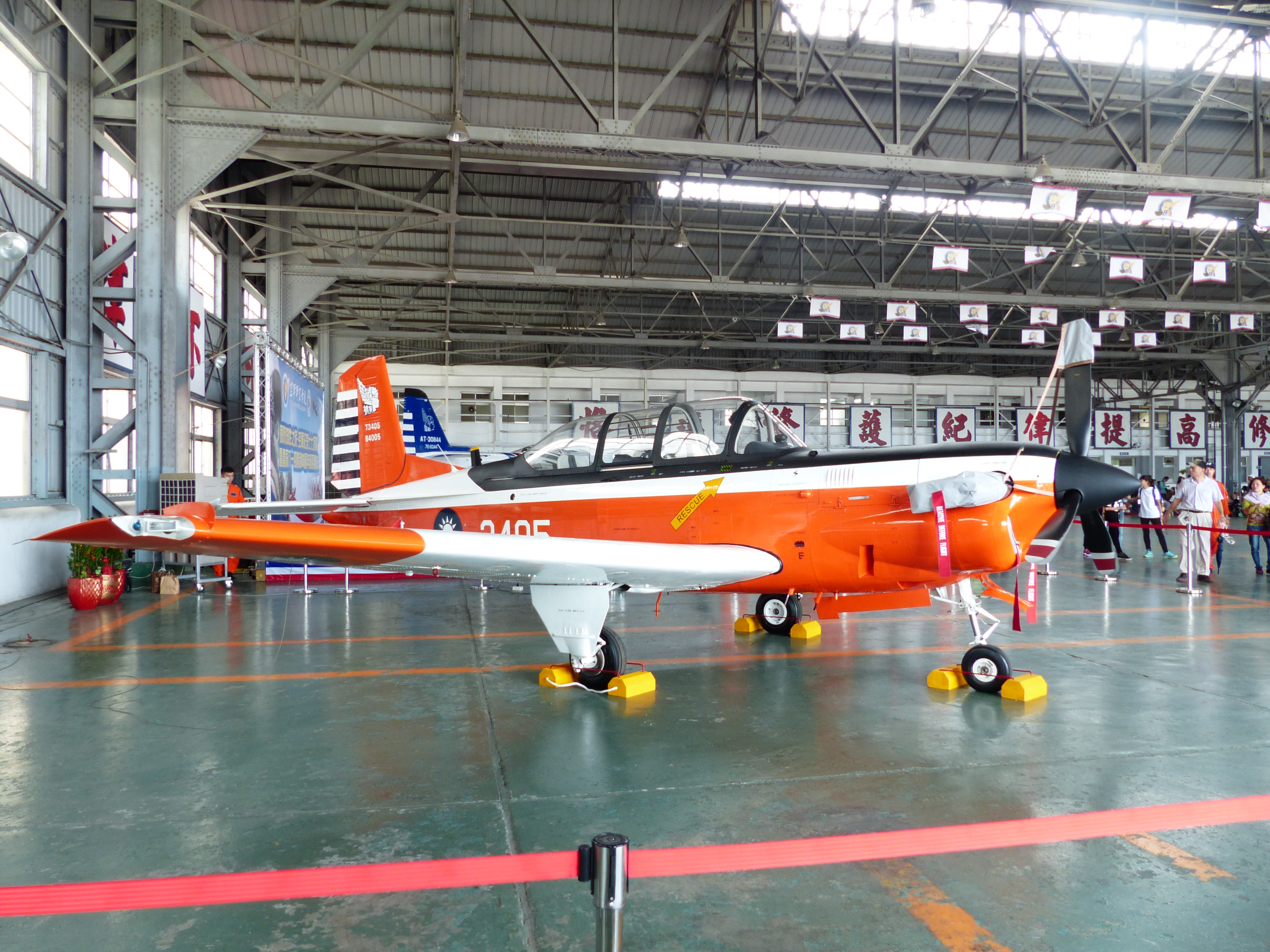
ROCAF Beechcraft T-34 Mentor in 2017

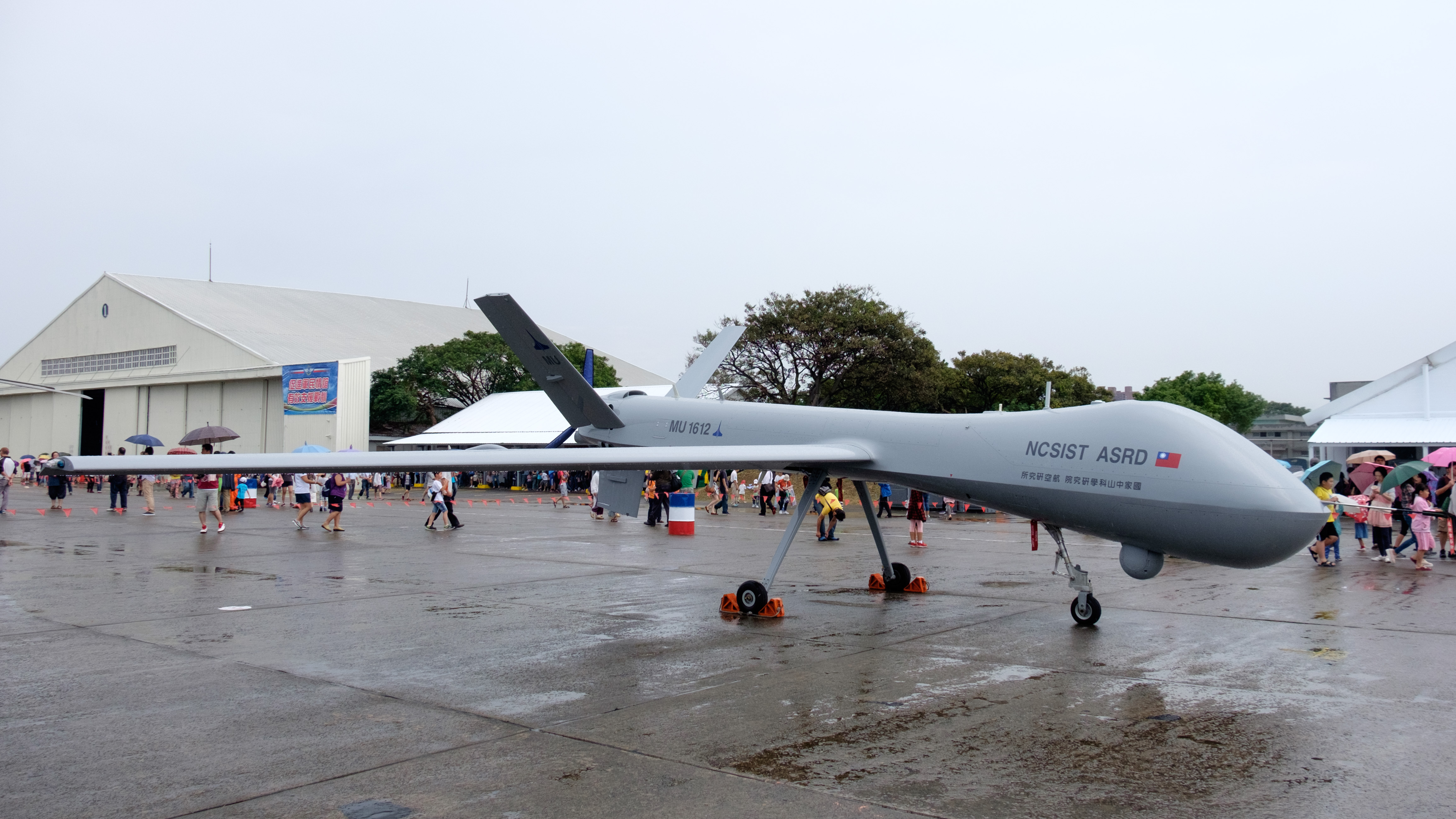
NCSIST Teng Yun in 2015

== Helicopters ==
Aircraft	Origin	Type	Variant	In service	Notes
Helicopters
Airbus Helicopters H225	France	SAR / Utility	EC225LP	3	
Sikorsky UH-60 Black Hawk	United States	SAR / Utility	UH-60M	14	
Sikorsky S-70	United States	SAR / Utility	S-70C-6/M	2	

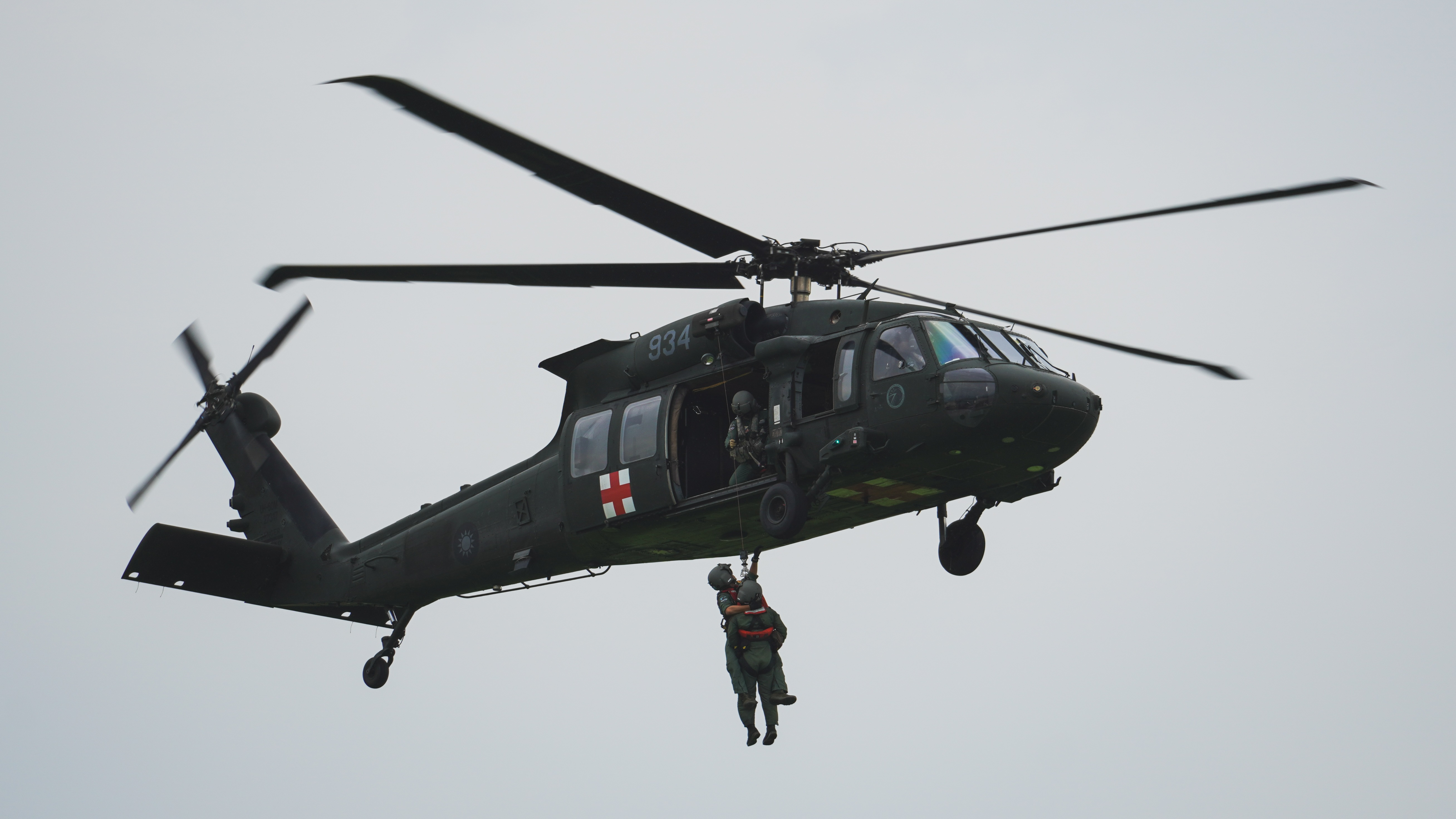
An UH-60 Black Hawk conducting search and rescue training

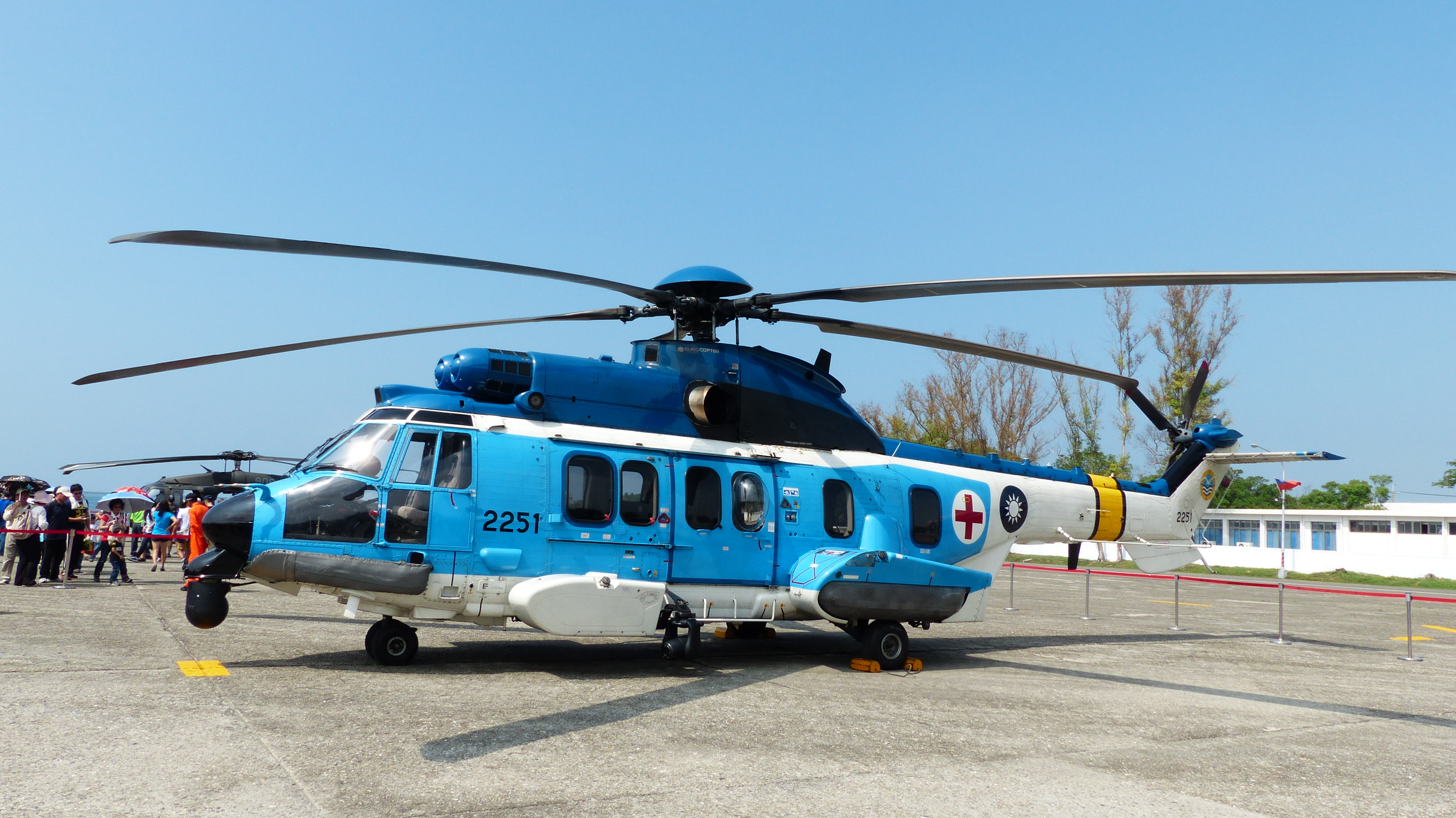
ROCAF Eurocopter EC225 Super Puma on display at Zuoying Naval Base

== Armament ==
Name	Origin	Type	Notes
Air-to-air missile
AIM-120C5/C7 AMRAAM	United States	beyond-visual-range missile	636 missiles obtained
AIM-120C8 AMRAAM	United States	beyond-visual-range missile	200 missiles obtained
AIM-7 Sparrow	United States	medium-range, semi-active radar	1,200 AIM-7Ms obtained
MBDA MICA	France	medium-range, active radar	960 missiles obtained
AIM-9 Sidewinder	United States	short-range IR guided	AIM-9J/Ps(2,216) – 9L/Ms (1,092) – AIM-9X (296)
Sky Sword I	Taiwan	short-range IR guided	Serial production began in 1991.
Sky Sword II	Taiwan	beyond-visual-range missile	At least 200 TC-2, unknown number TC-2C.
Magic II	France	short-range IR guided	480 missiles obtained
Air-to-surface missile
AGM-65 Maverick	United States	Air-to-surface missile	(500) AGM-65s – (40) 65Gs – (235) 65G2s
Wan Chien	Taiwan	Air-to-surface cruise missile	>150 missiles obtained
TC-2A	Taiwan	Anti-radiation missile	variant of TC-2
AGM-88 HARM	United States	Anti-radiation missile	150 AGM-88B were ordered and upgraded to the AGM-88F HCSM variant after refurbishment, 23 AGM-88 training missiles
AGM-84H SLAM-ER	United States	Air-to-surface cruise missile	135 AGM-84H ordered in late 2020 to be delivered over the next 8 years
Anti-ship missile
AGM-84 Harpoon	United States	anti-ship missile	(120) AGM-84Ls
Hsiung Feng II	Taiwan	anti-ship missile	
Hsiung Feng III	Taiwan	anti-ship missile	
Bombs
AGM-154 JSOW	United States	Glide bomb	56 ordered, later reduced to 50 Block III (C-1) models, with deliveries to be completed by March 2028
Paveway	United States	Precision guided bomb	
Joint Direct Attack Munition	United States	Precision-guided munition	
Mark 82 bomb	United States	bomb	
Mark 83 bomb	United States	bomb	
Mark 84 bomb	United States	bomb	
Sensor pods
Sniper Targeting Pod	United States	Targeting Pod	20 AAQ-33s obtained
LANTIRN	United States	Targeting Pod	(28) AN/AAQ-19, (28) AAQ-20
AN/VDS-5 LOROP-EO	United States	Reconnaissance Pod	(12) AN/VDS-5
MS-110	United States	Reconnaissance Pod	6 MS-110 units were ordered in 2020, capable of infrared and colour imaging. The contract was completed in 2023.
Infrared Search and Track System	United States	IRST Pod	Ordered in August 2023, will likely be Lockheed Martin's Legion Pod
AN/ALQ-184	United States	Electronic countermeasure	(82) AN/ALQ-184(V)7
AN/ALQ-254	United States	Electronic countermeasure	140 AN/ALQ-254 units were ordered in 2025

Paveway

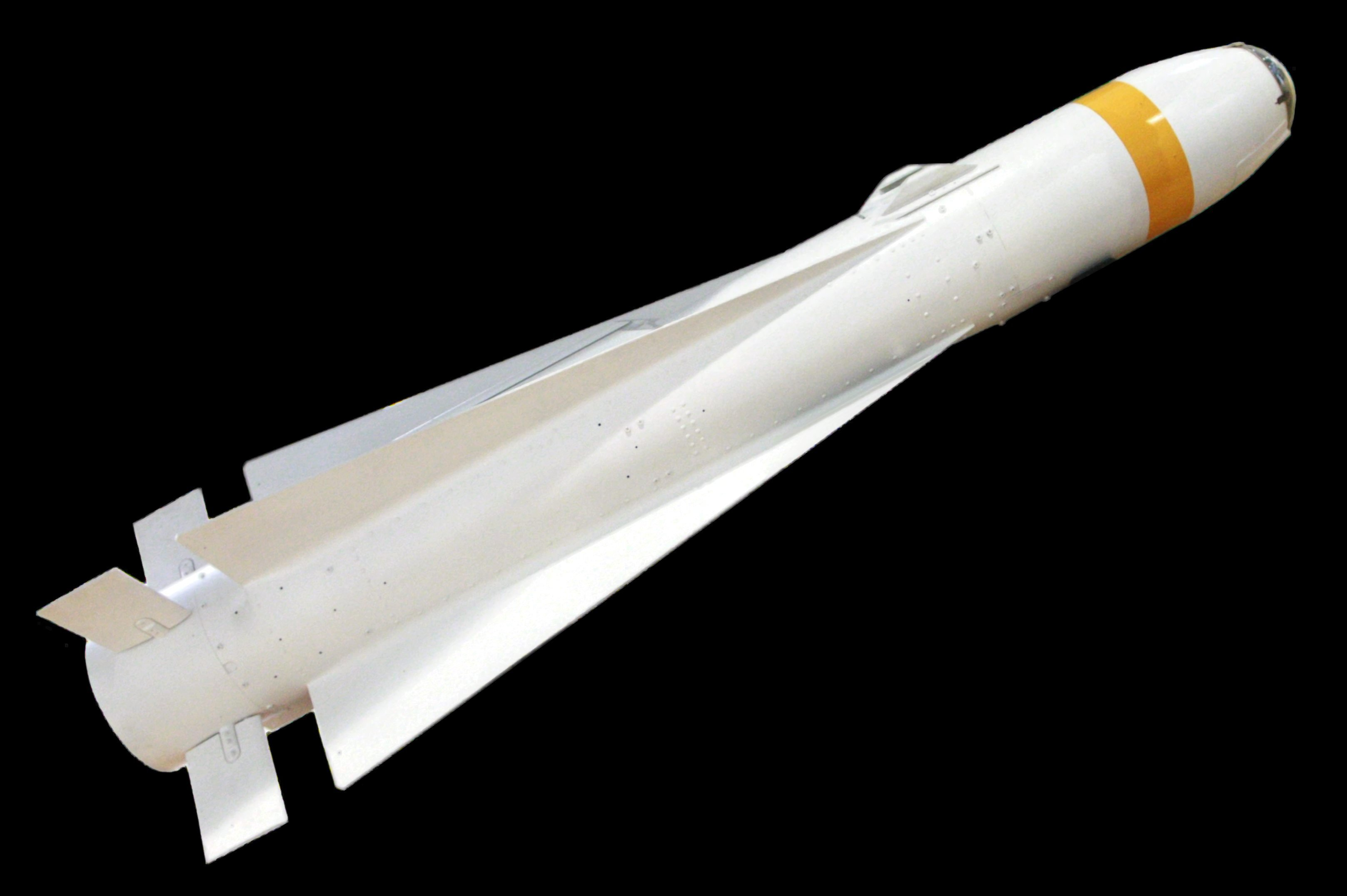
AGM-65 Maverick

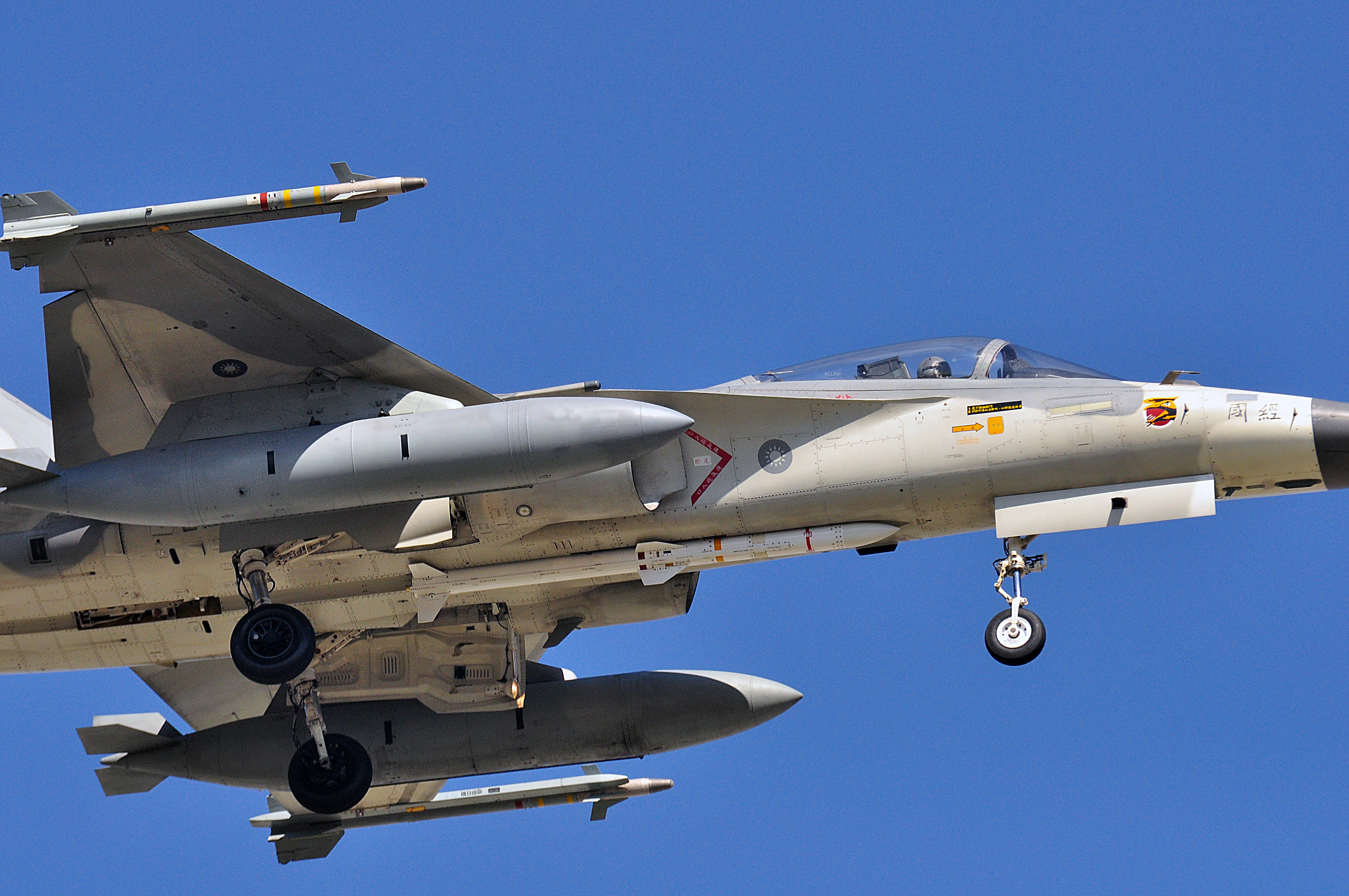
F-CK-1A with Sky Sword 1 and Sky Sword 2

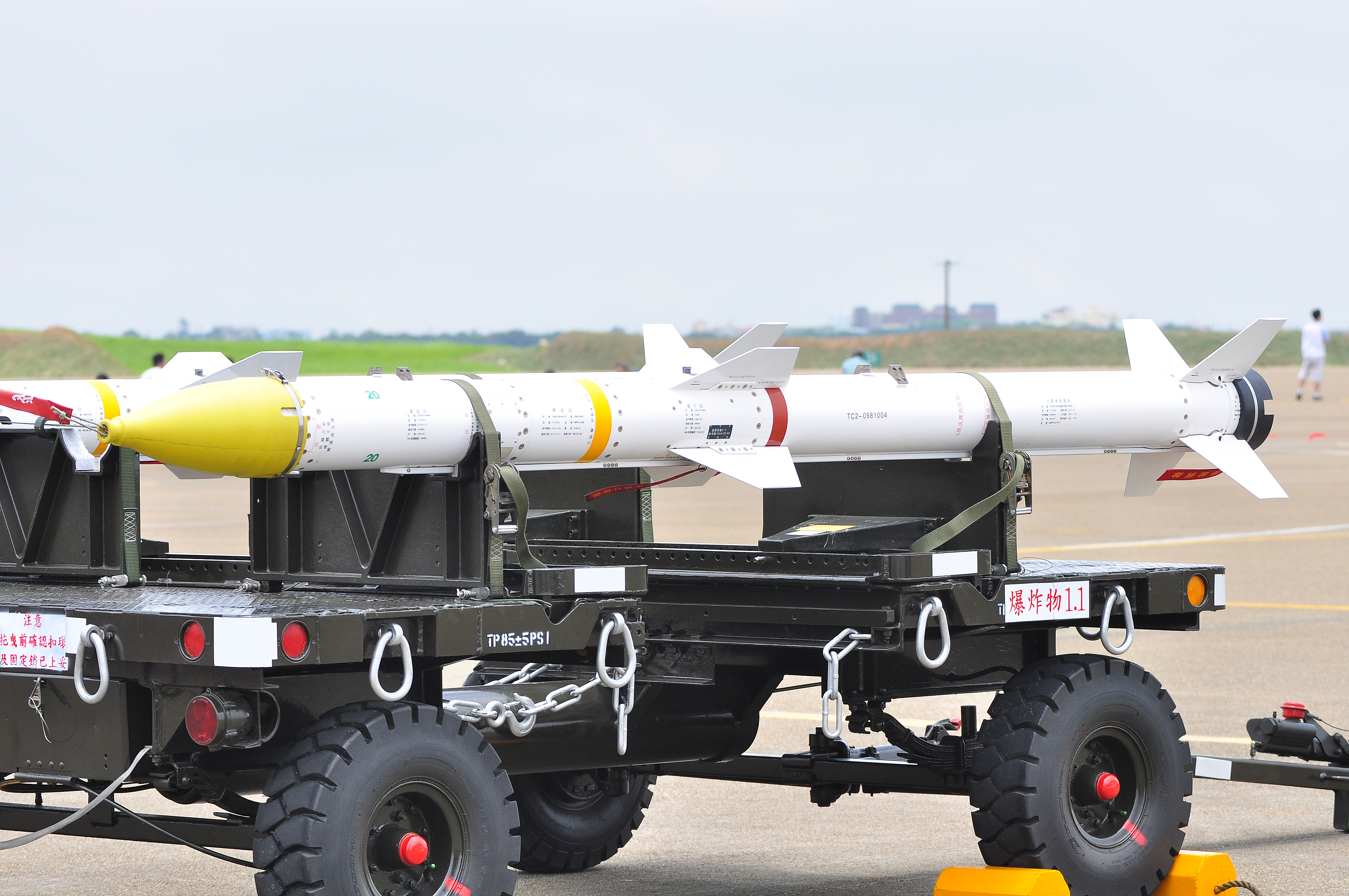
Sky Sword 2 (original air-to-air version)

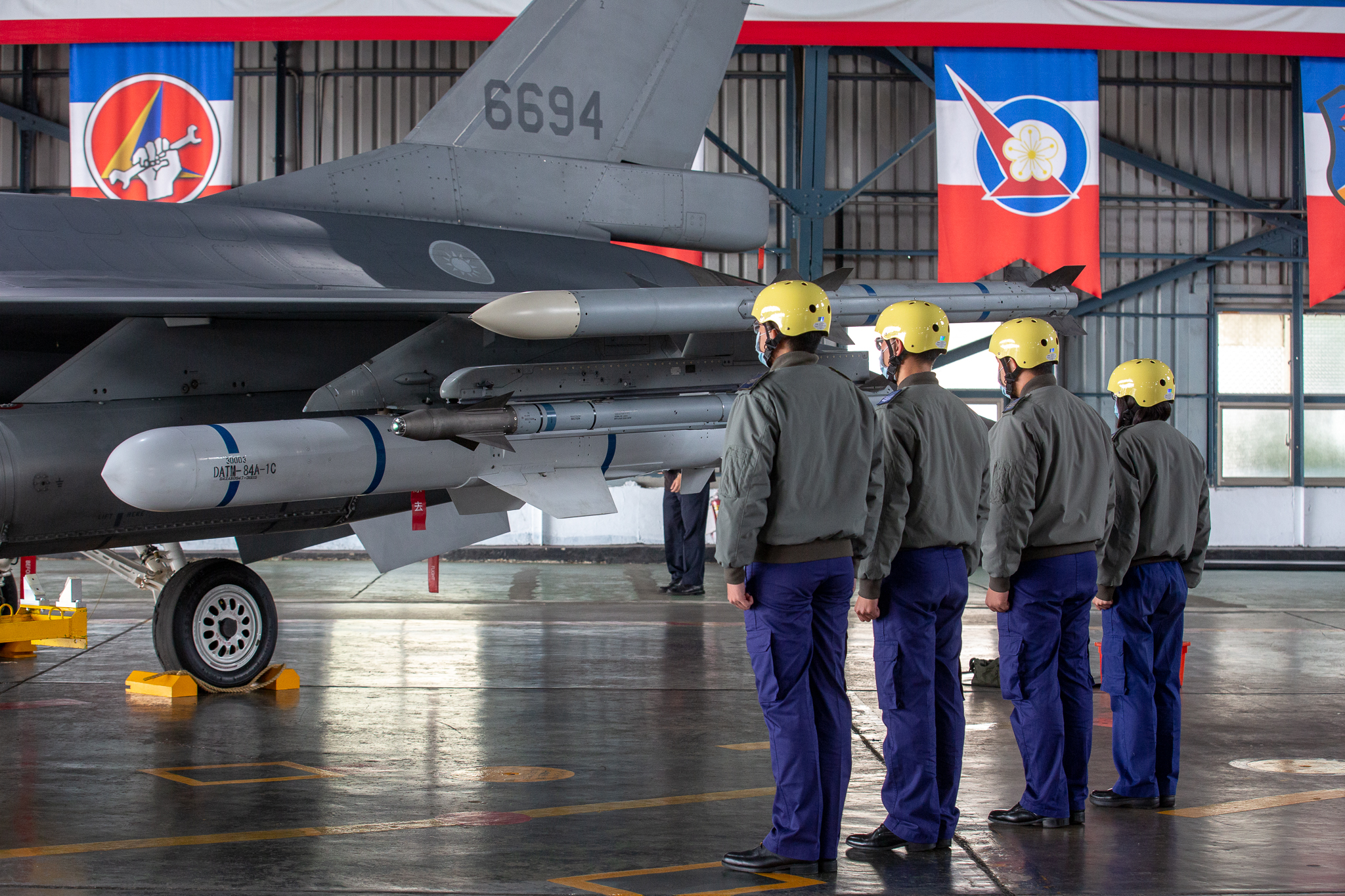
A view of an AGM-84 Harpoon air-to-surface anti-ship missile fixed under the wing of a F-16 with an AIM-120 on the wingtip

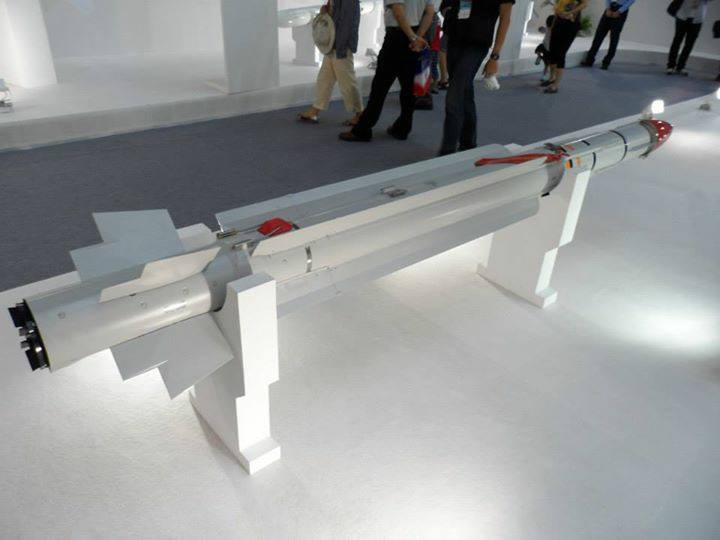
Mock-up of an MBDA MICA missile in Taiwan

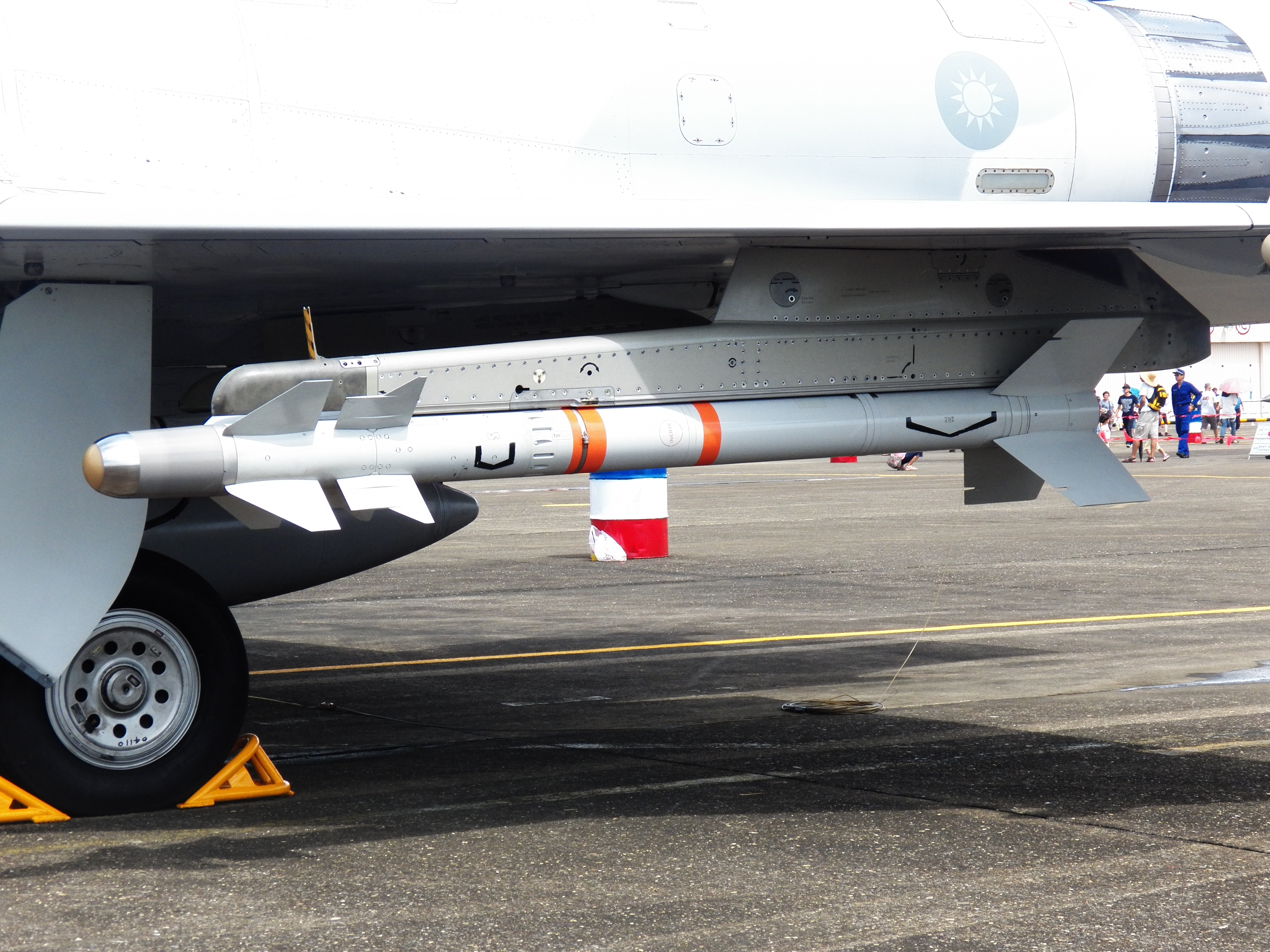
R.550 Magic on a ROCAF Mirage 2000

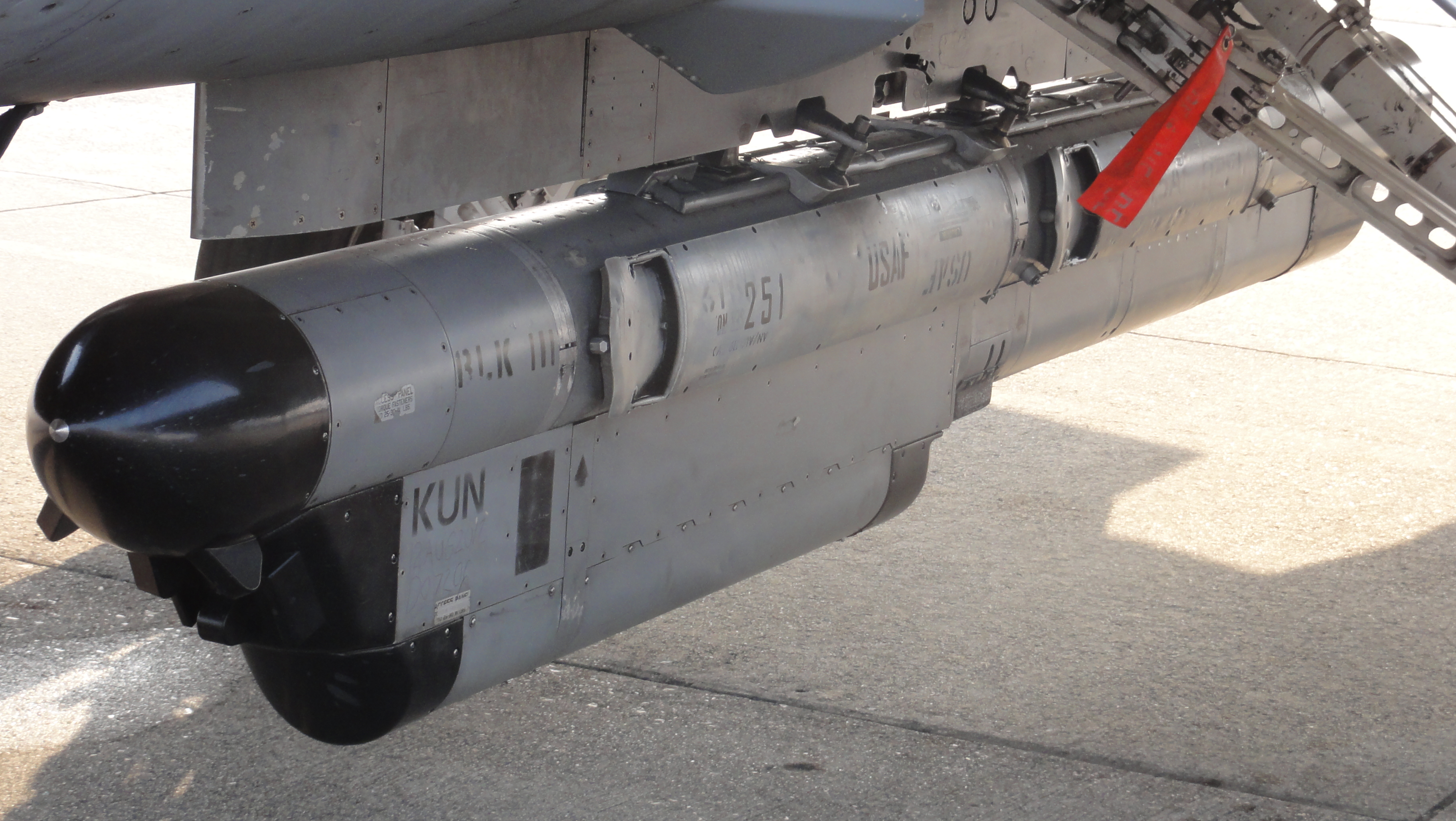
ANALQ-184(V)

== Ground based strike ==
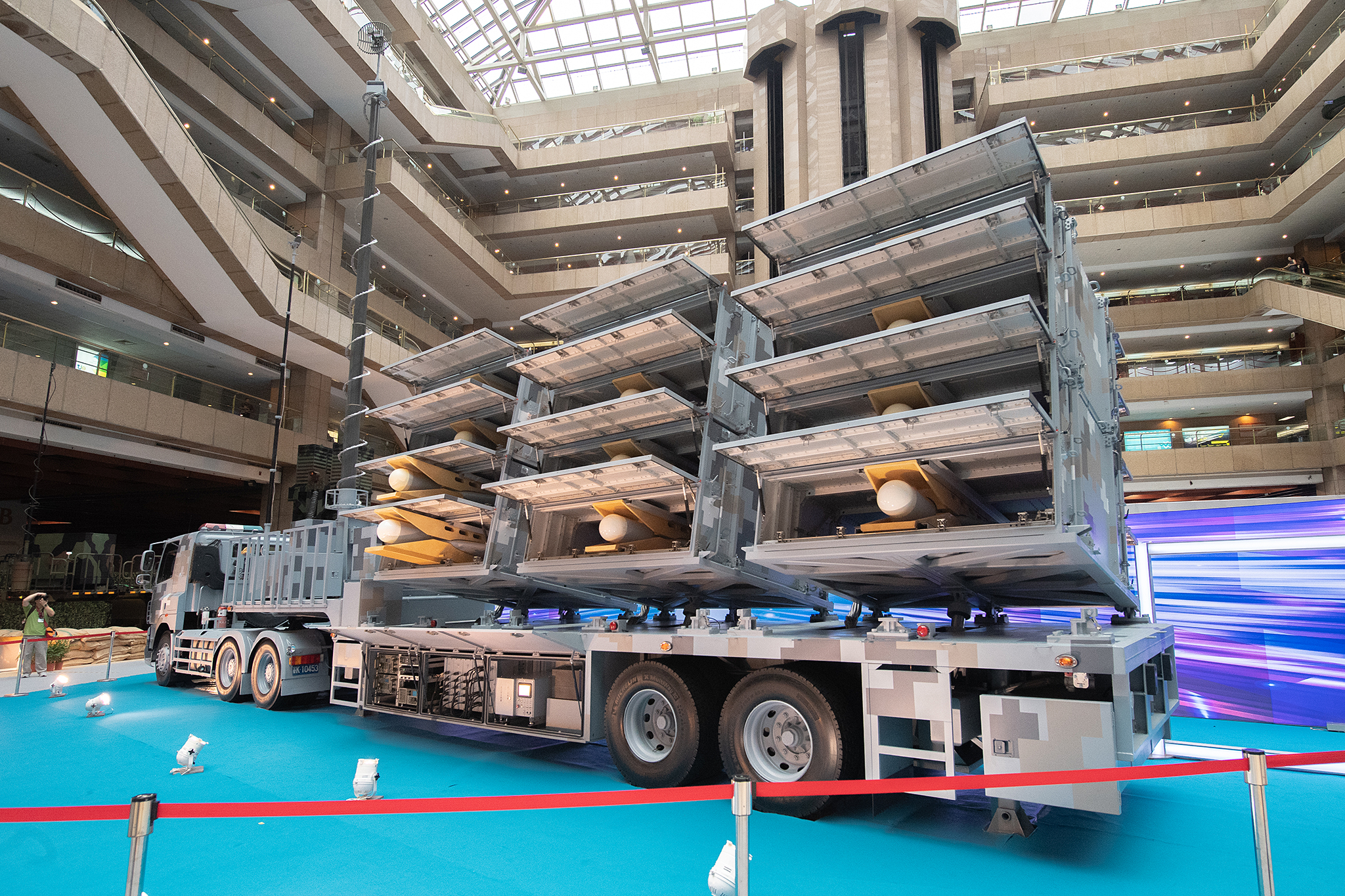
NCSIST Chien Hsiang system displayed at the 2019 Taipei Aerospace & Defense Technology Exhibition

Name	Origin	Type	Notes
Loitering munitions and cruise missiles
NCSIST Chien Hsiang	Taiwan	Loitering munition	In service, 104 in initial order
Hsiung Feng IIE	Taiwan	Cruise missile	In service, ~300 (2012)
Yun Feng	Taiwan	Cruise missile	In service
Ballistic missiles
Sky Spear	Taiwan	Short range ballistic missile	In service

== Air and missile defense ==
Name	Origin	Type	In service	Notes
Anti-aircraft and anti-missile systems
MIM-104 Patriot	United States	SAM system	9	received upgrade to PAC-3 264 additional PAC-3 interceptors delivered in 2011, 122 PAC-3 interceptors delivered in 2015. PAC-3 MSE ordered in 2021.
Sky Bow II	Taiwan	SAM system	6	These batteries are currently being phased out for Sky Bow IIIs
Sky Bow III	Taiwan	SAM system	12+	Twelve batteries were ordered in the initial mass-production batch. Another twelve are on order to replace HAWK and Sky Bow II batteries, with deliveries beginning in 2022.
Sky Bow IV	Taiwan	SAM system	2+	Mass production to begin in 2025
Skyguard	Switzerland	towed twin-barreled anti-aircraft autocannon	24	twin gun, 35mm rounds
AIM-7 Sparrow/RIM-7 Sea Sparrow	United States	SAM system	500+	used on towed launcher as part of the Skyguard System
Radars
AN/FPS-117	United States	Long-Range Search Radar System	11	4 units are mobile
PAVE PAWS	United States	Early warning radar system	1	
AN/TPS-75	United States	Long-Range Search Radar		Upgraded from AN/TPS-43F

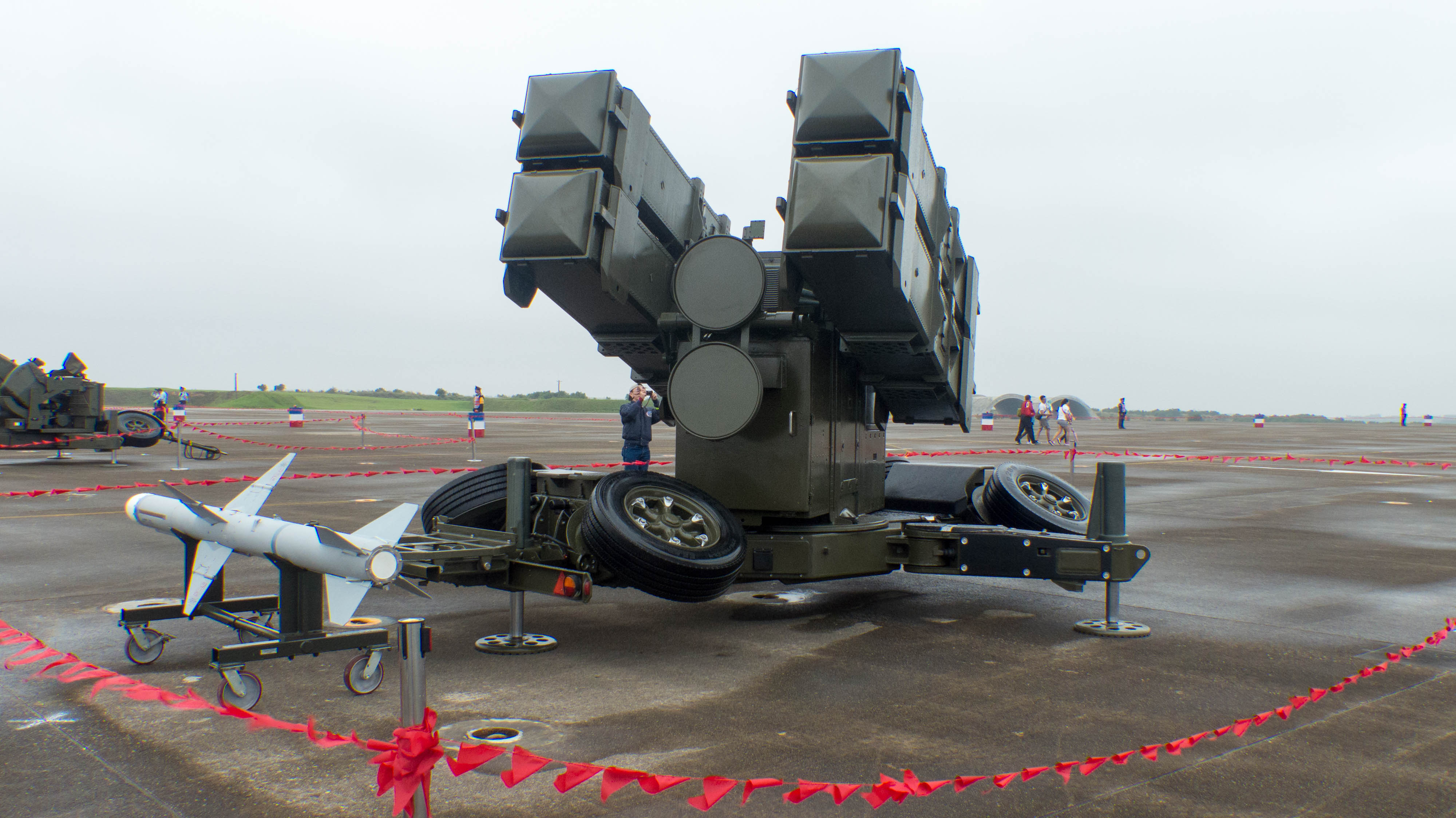
Skyguard Sparrow Missile Launcher

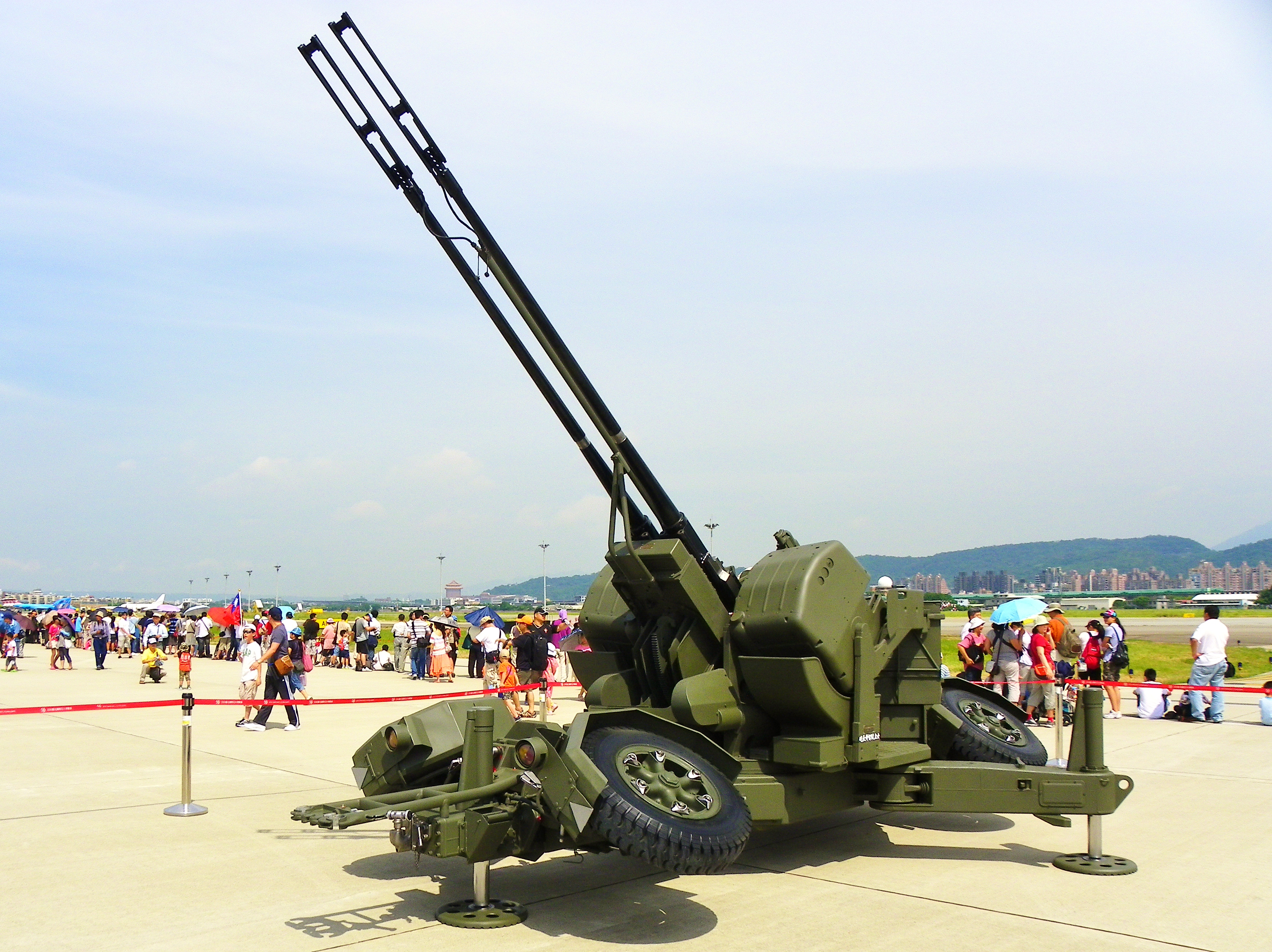
Oerlikon GDF-003 35mm Twin Cannon at Songshan Air Force Base

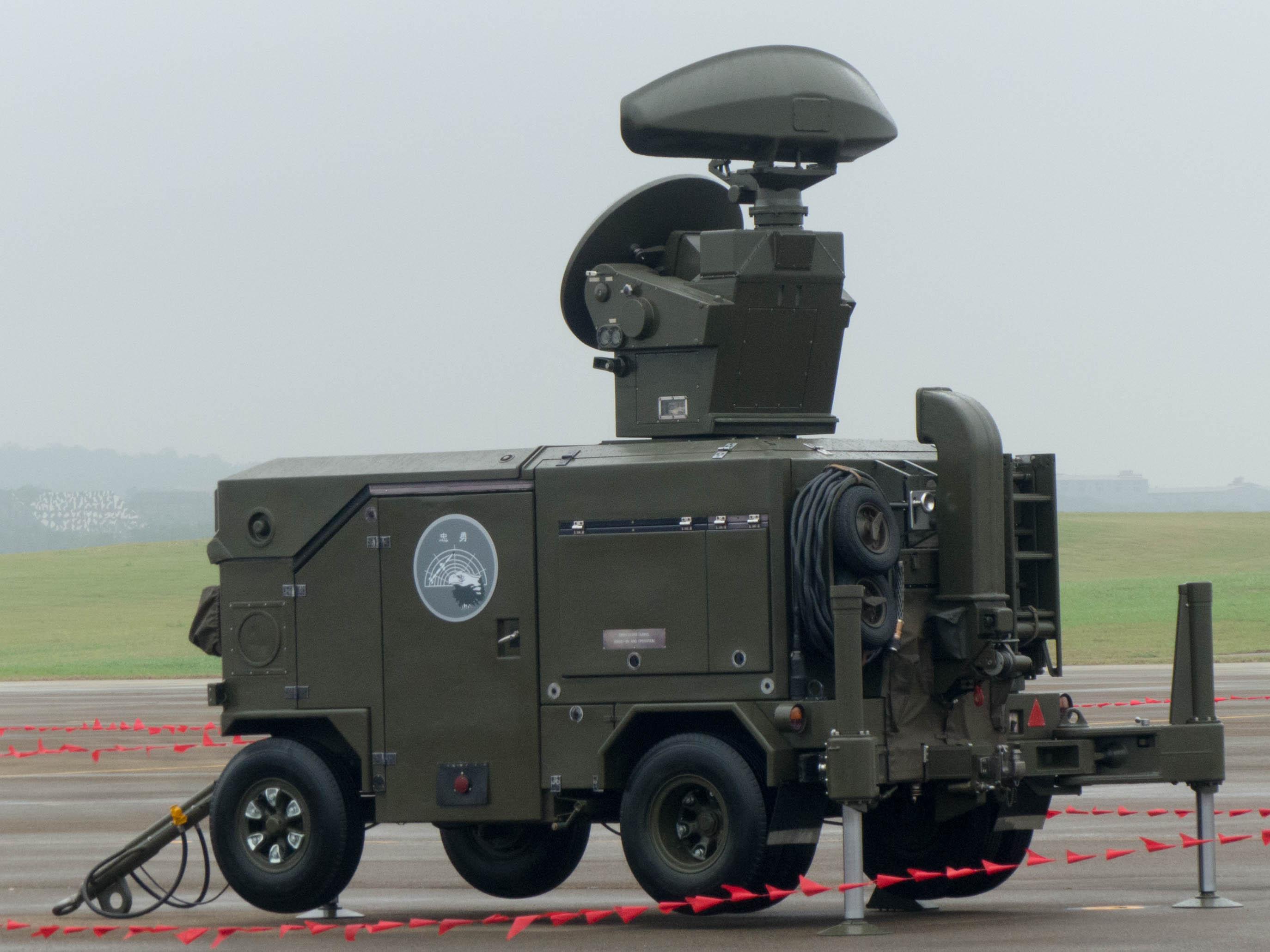
Skyguard Radar Display at Ching Chuang Kang AFB

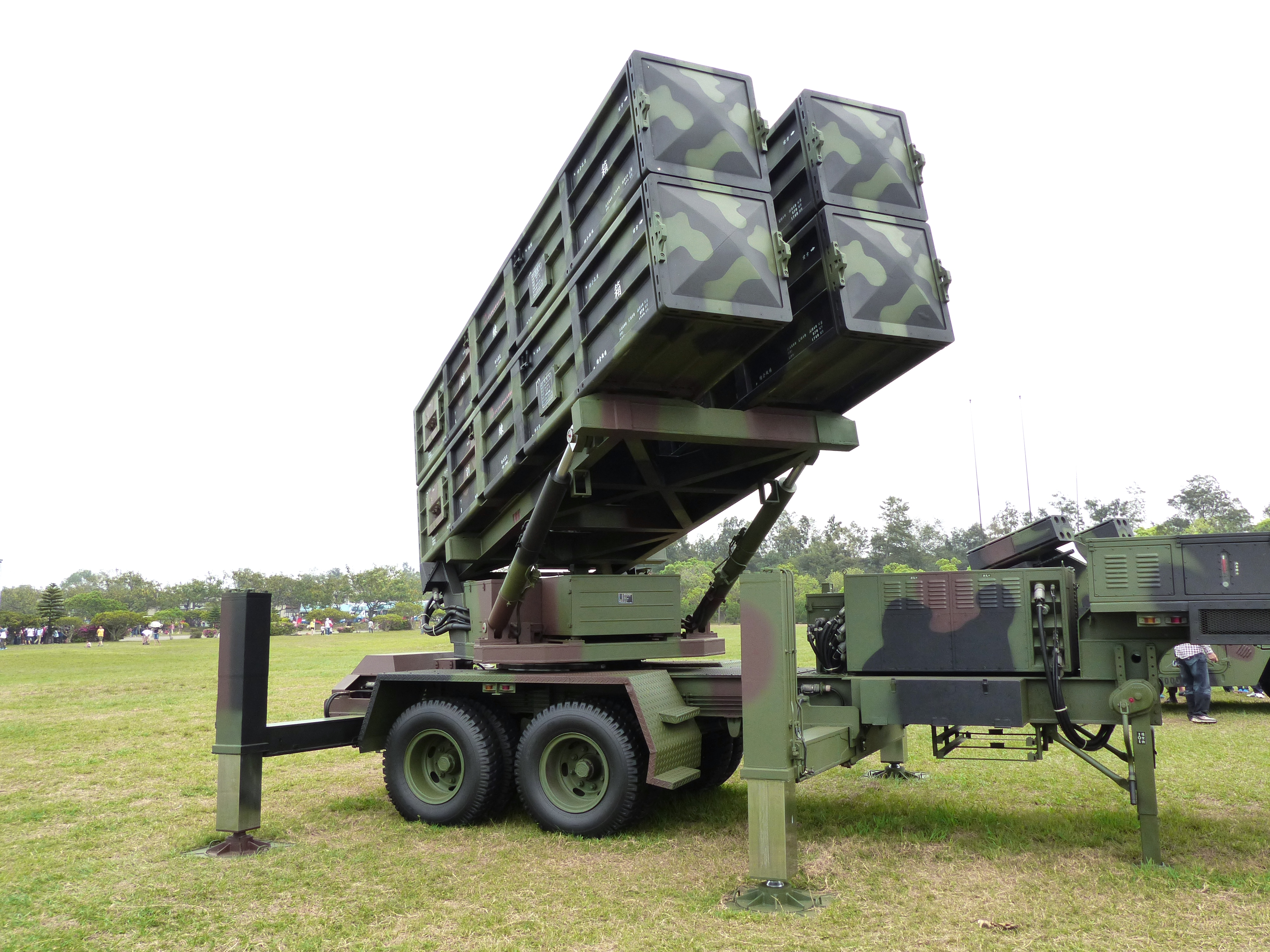
Sky Bow (Tien Kung) II Missile Launcher Display at Hukou Camp Ground

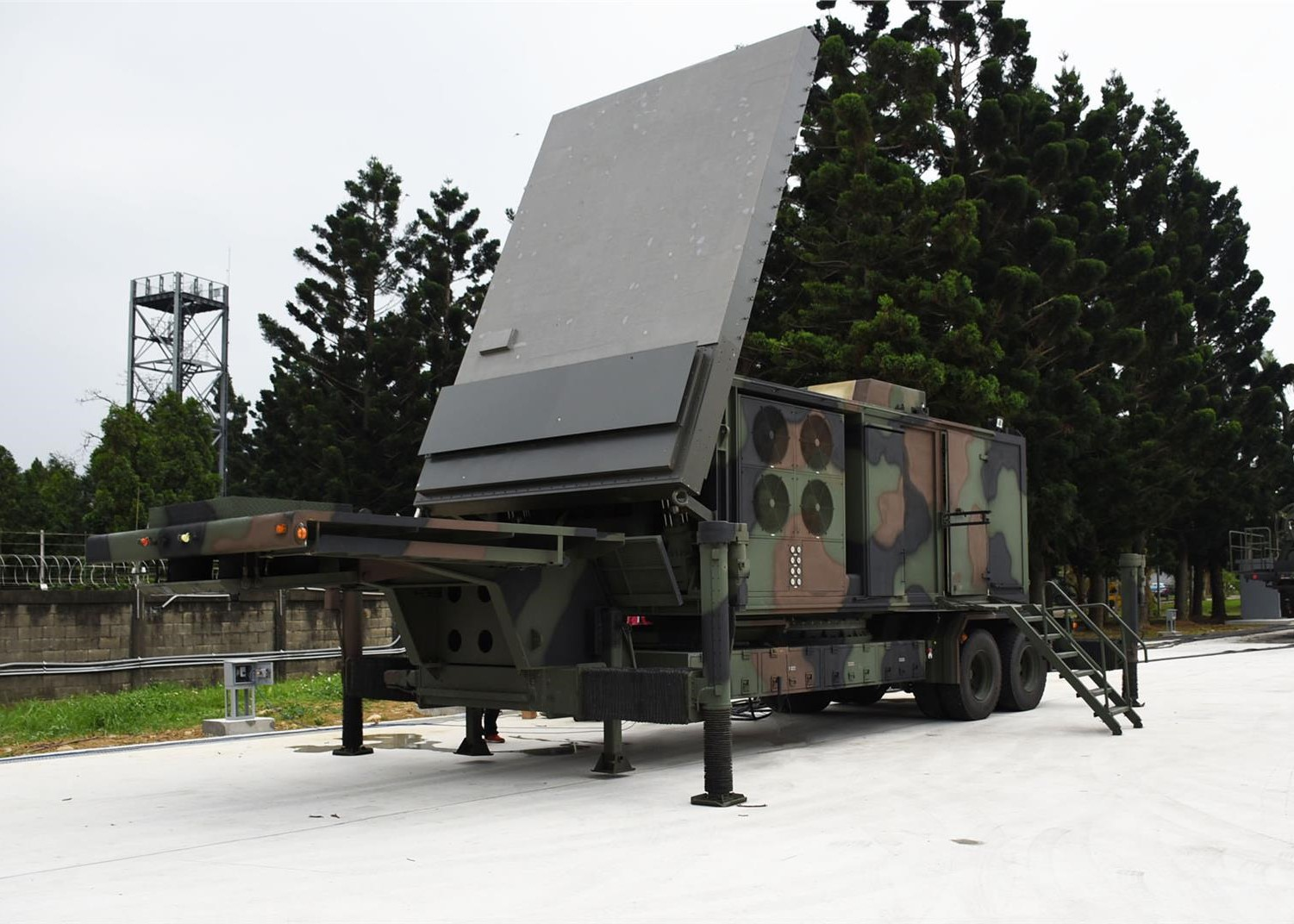
TK-3 radar

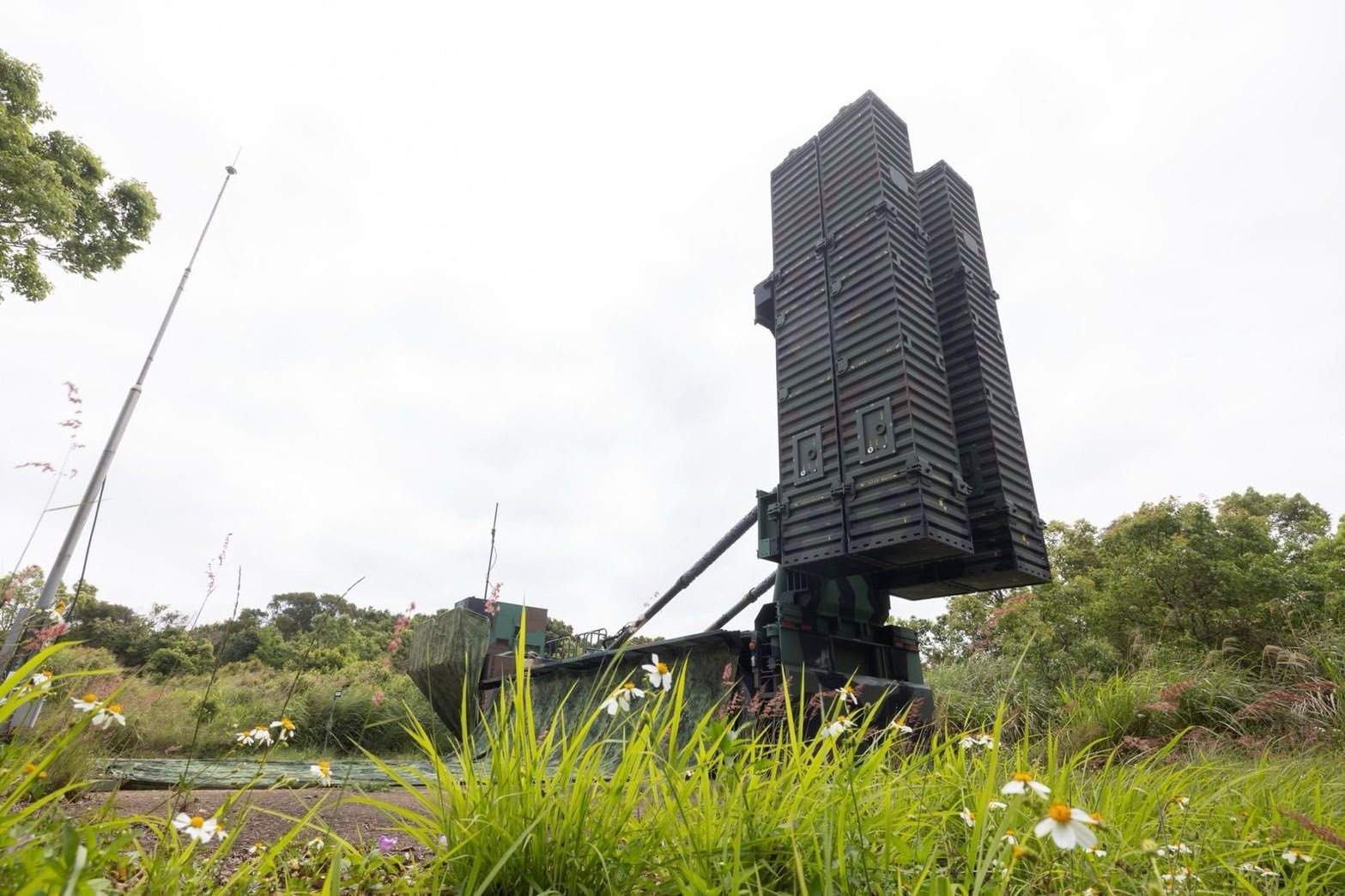
TK-3 missile launcher

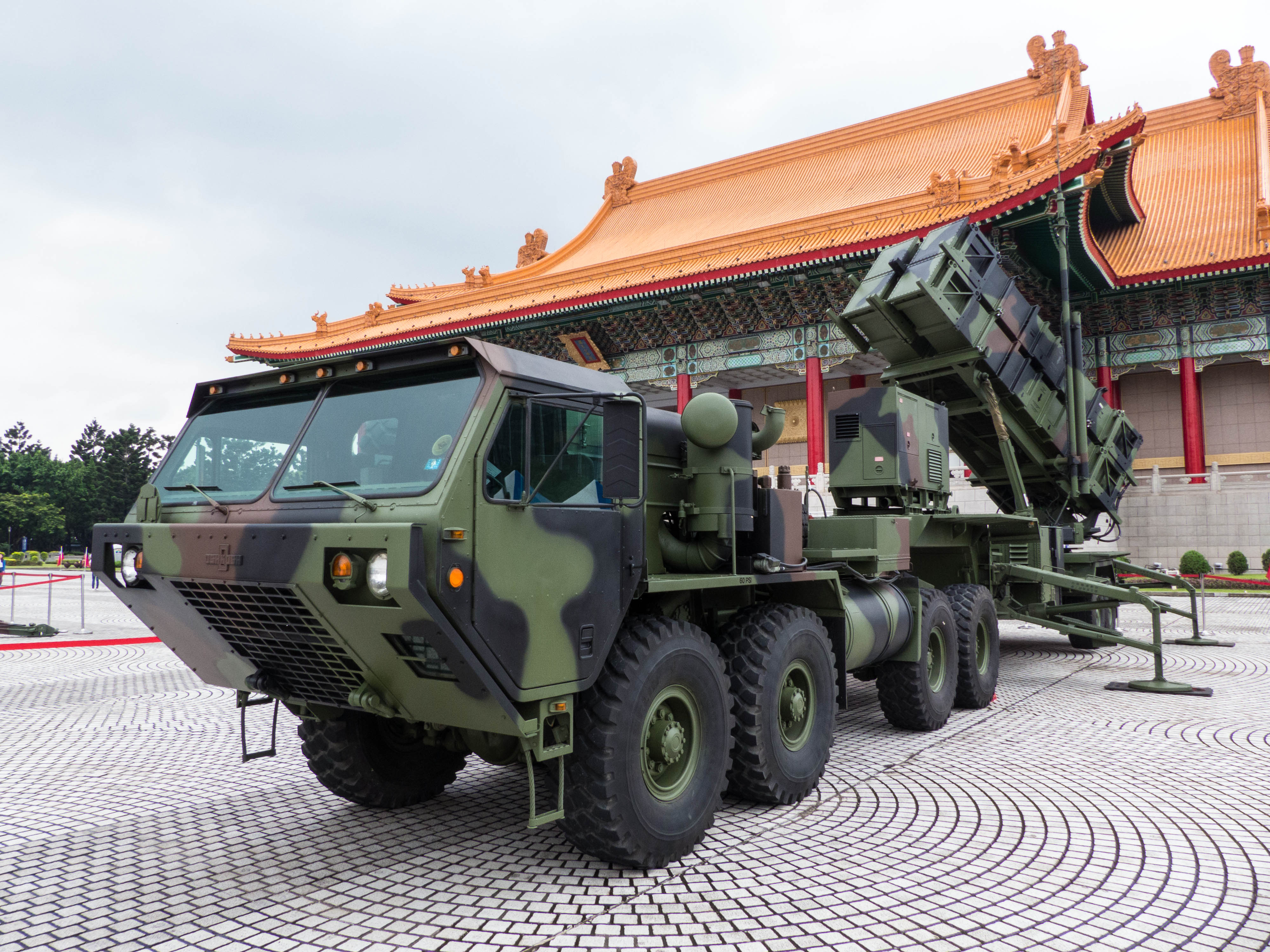
MIM-104 Patriot (PAC-2) launcher on display at the Chiang Kai-shek Memorial Hall in 2014

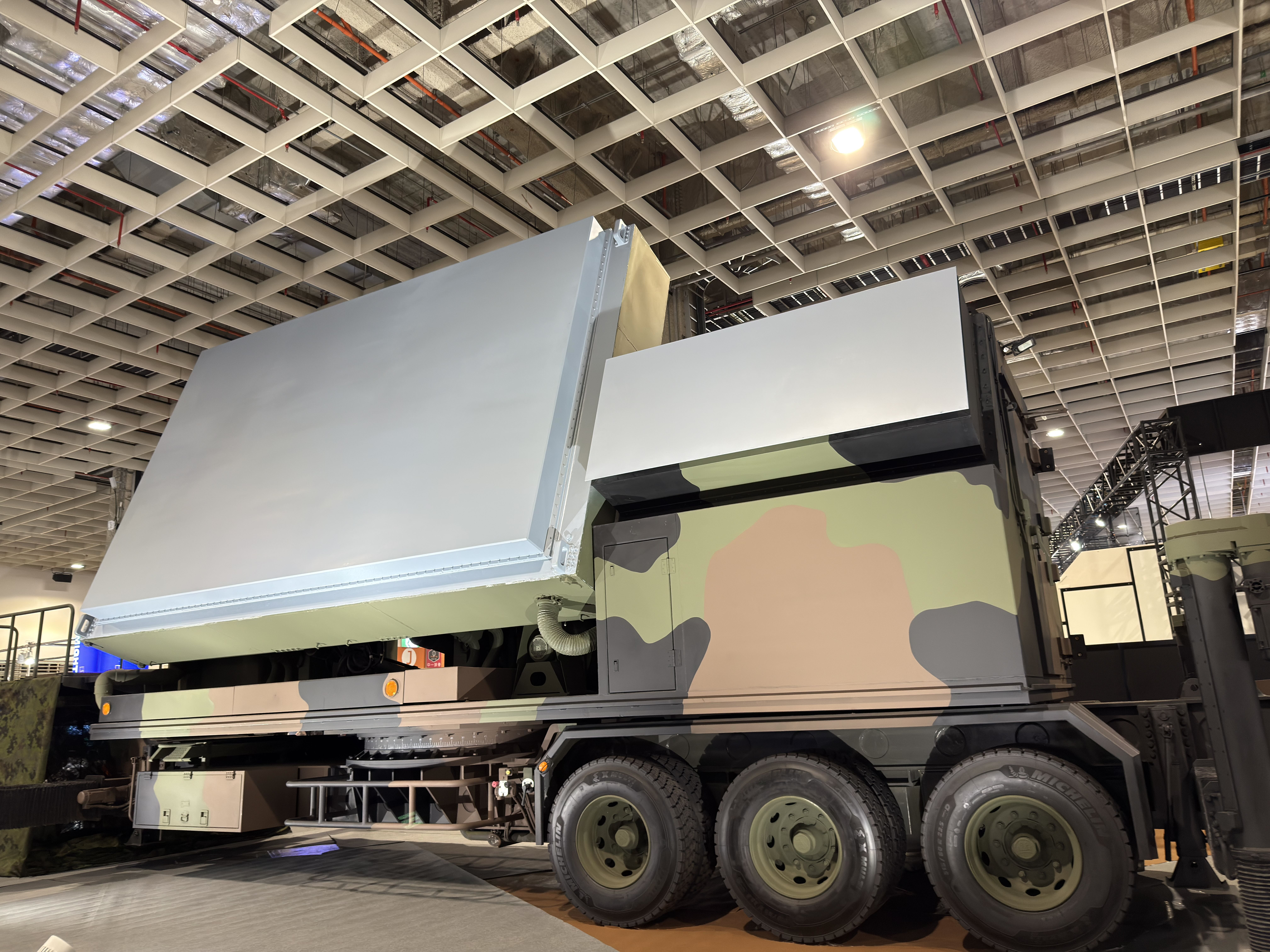
Sky Bow IV radar

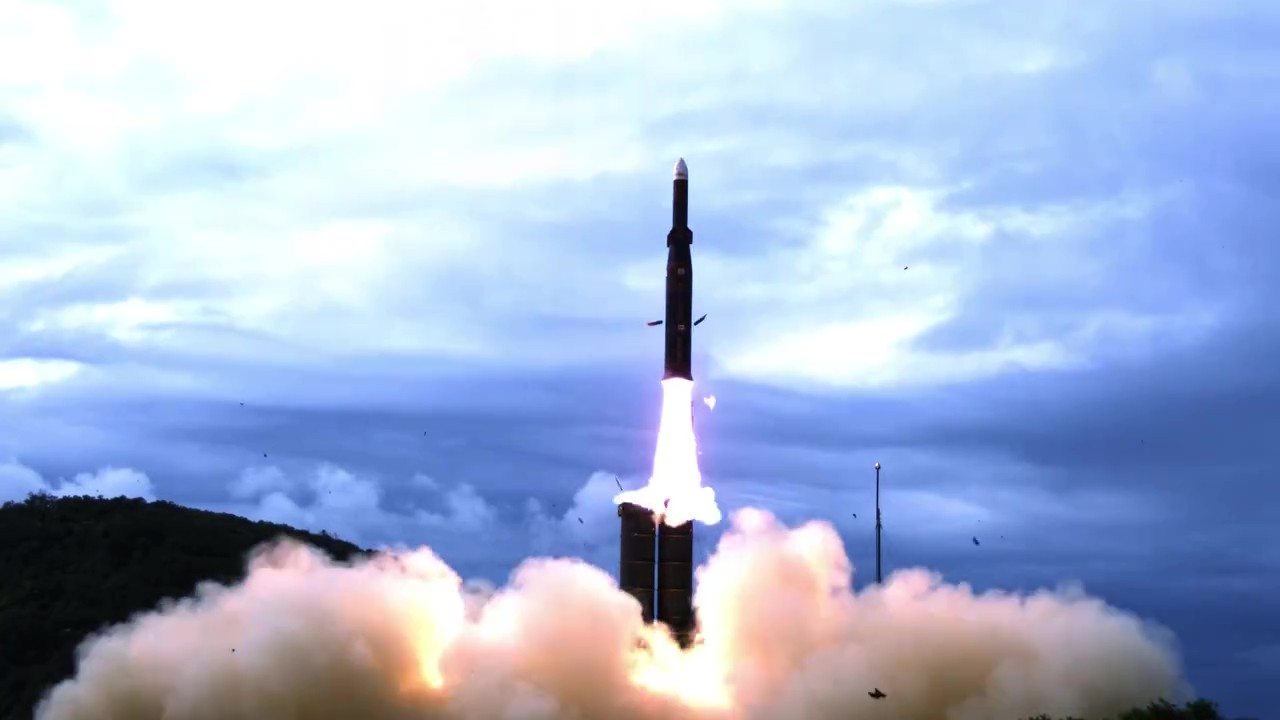
Sky Bow IV missile and launcher unit

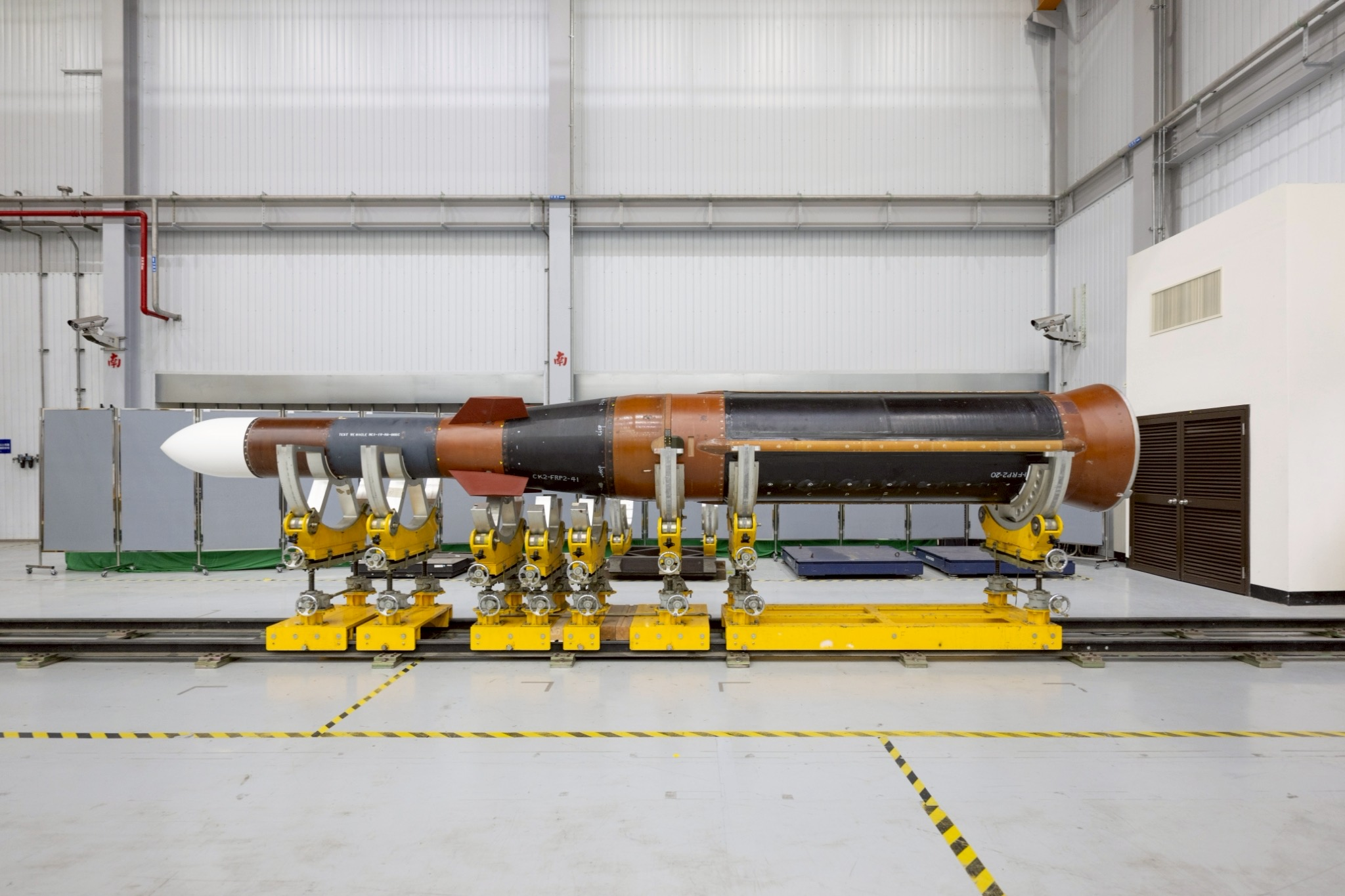
Sky Bow IV missile

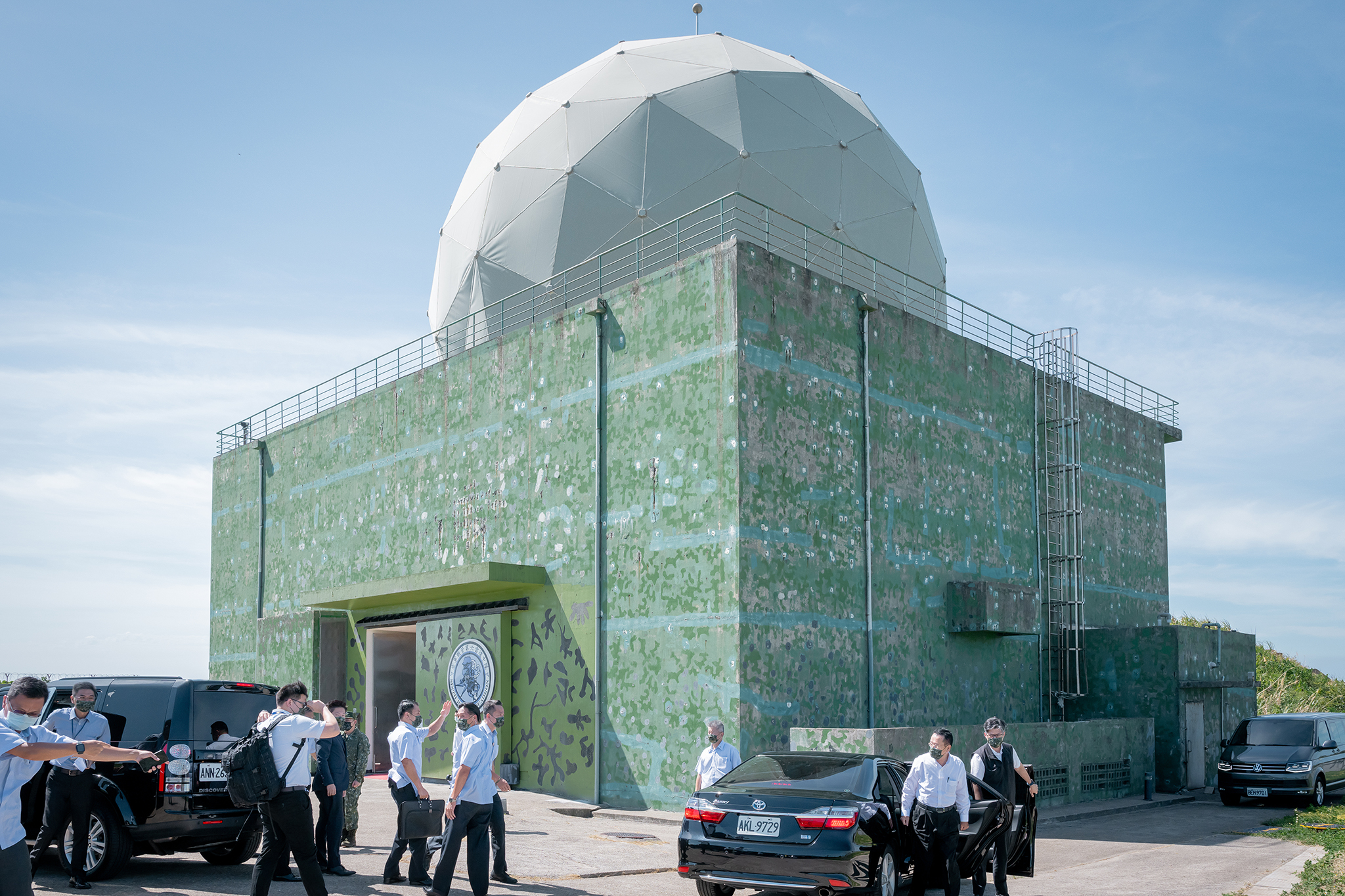
ROCAF fixed radar site

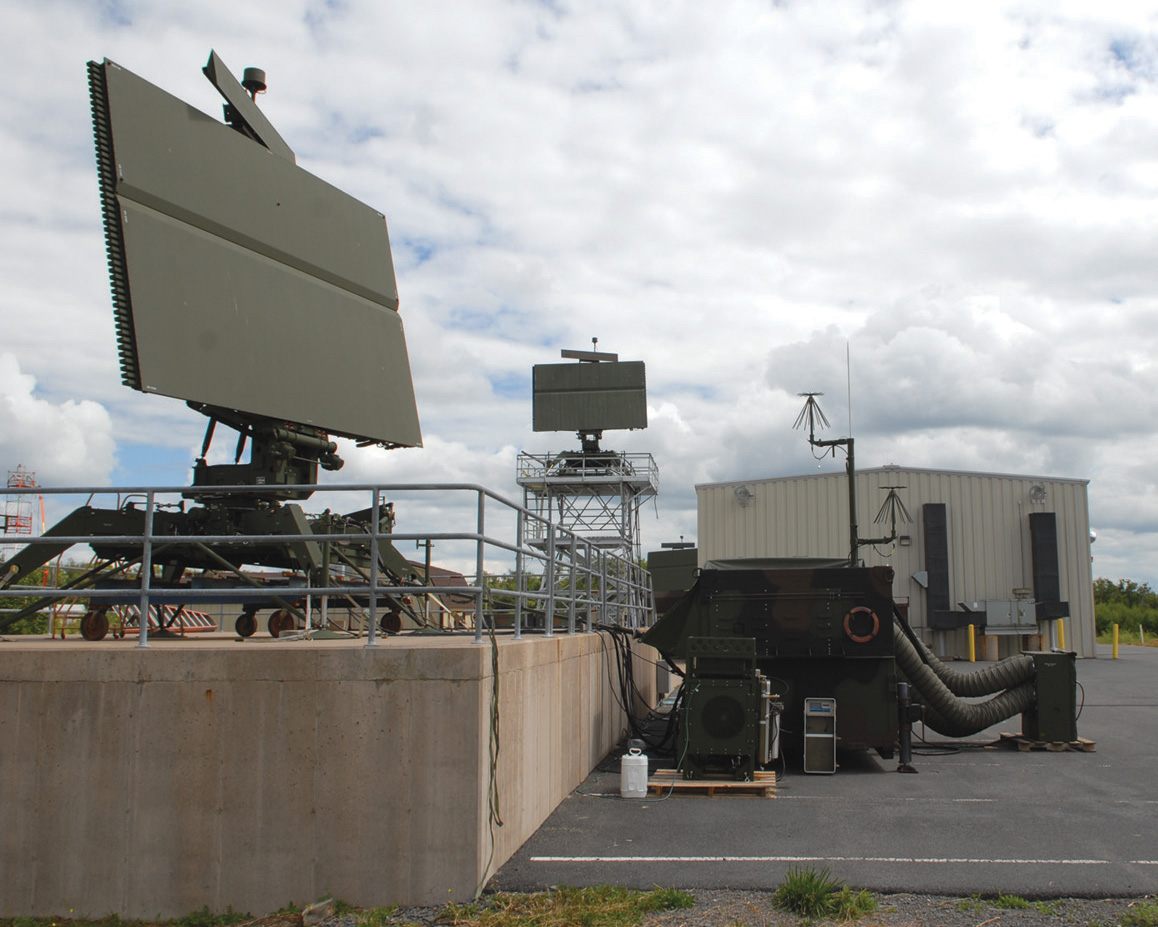
AN/TPS-75 radar

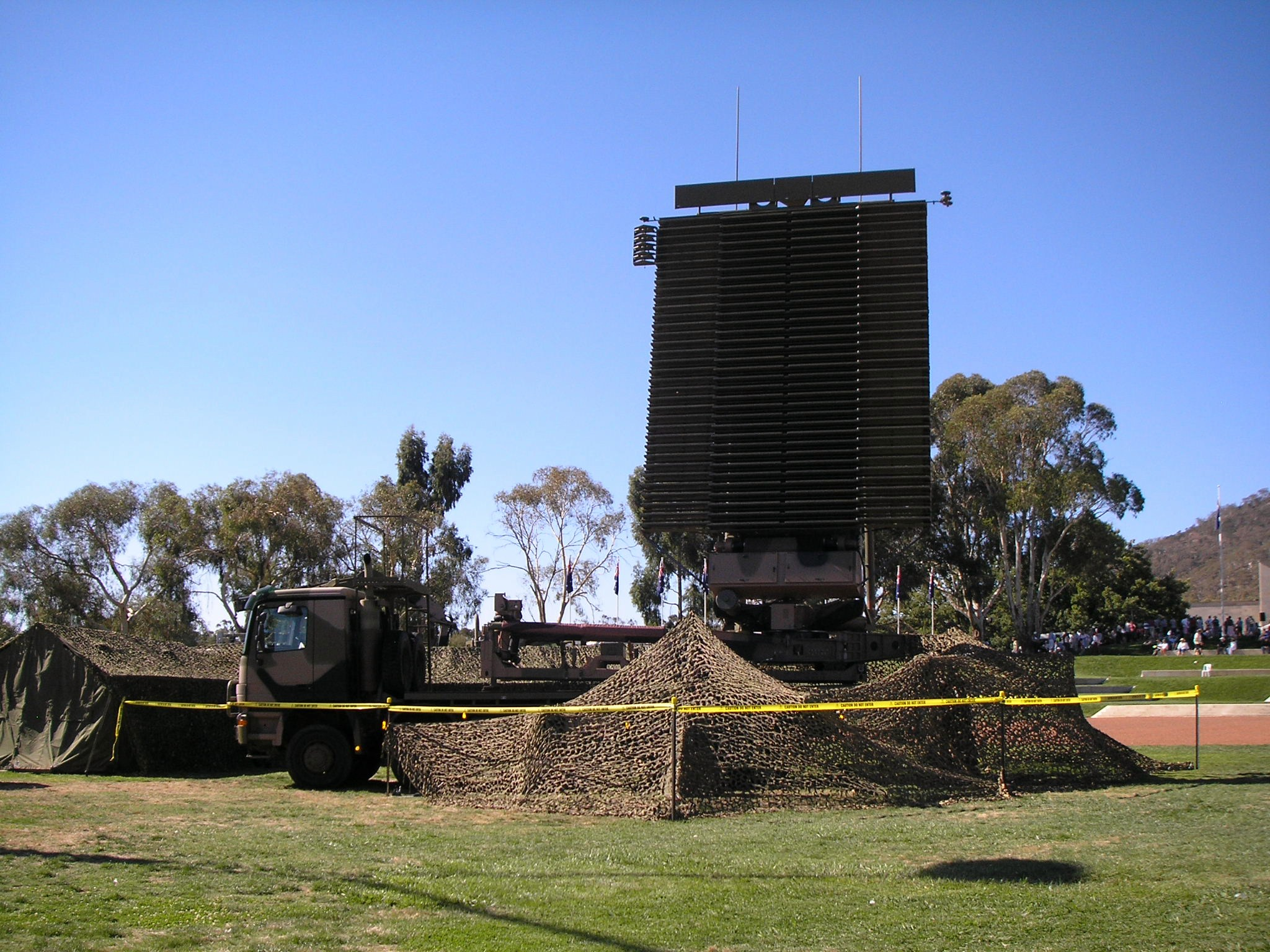
AN/FPS-117 radar

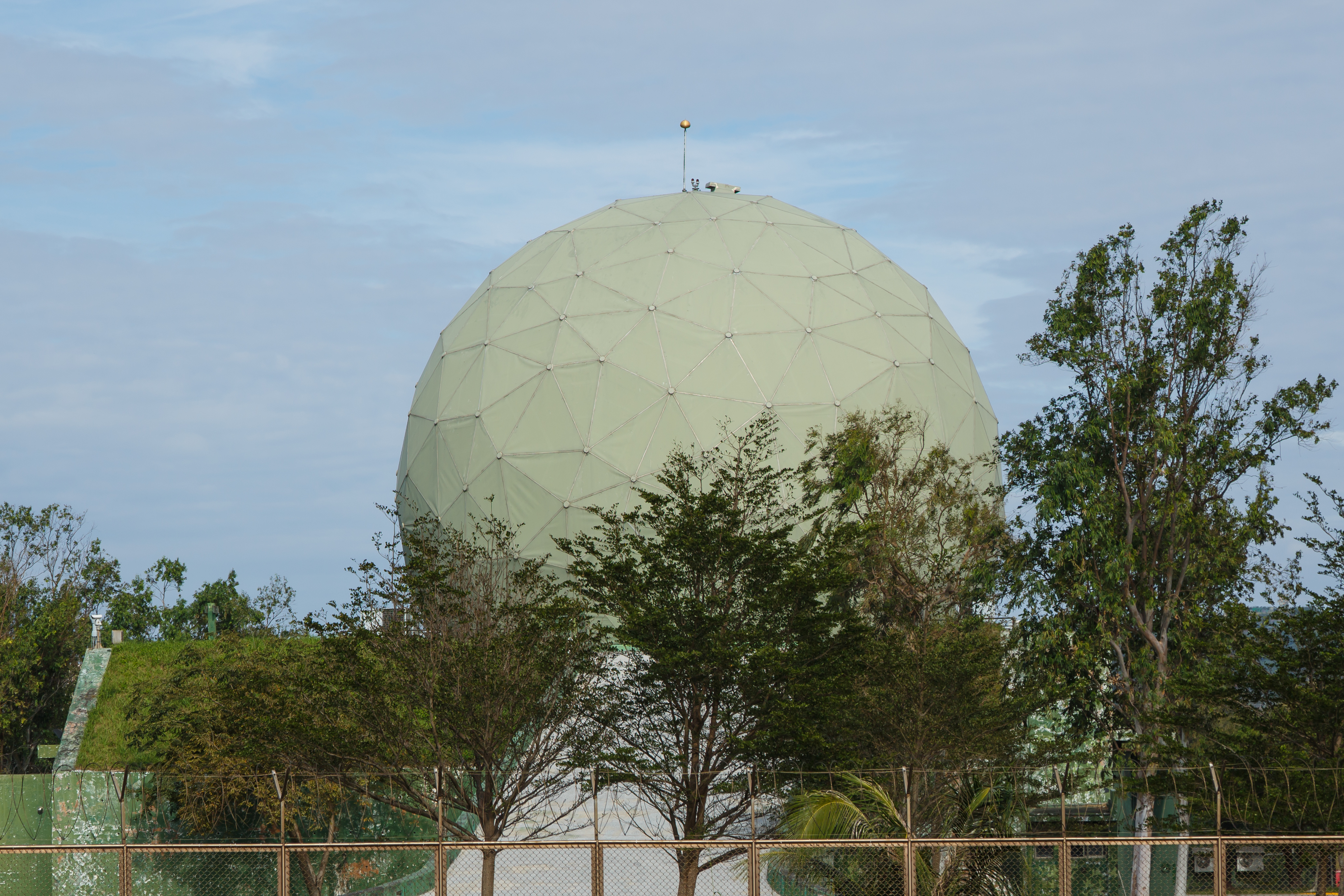
Radar Station at Chihhang Air Base

== Retired ==
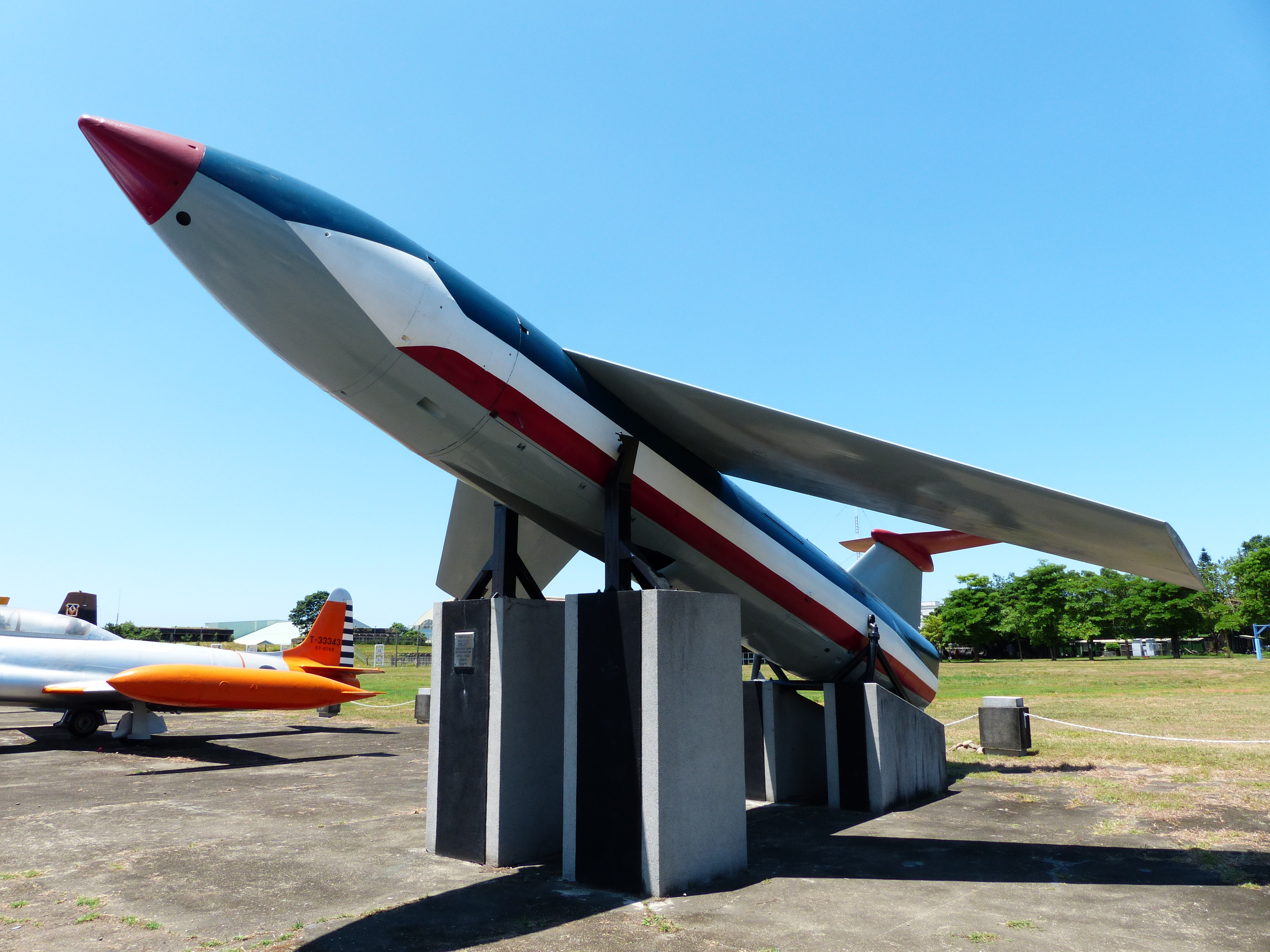
MGM-1C Matador Display at Tainan Air Force Base

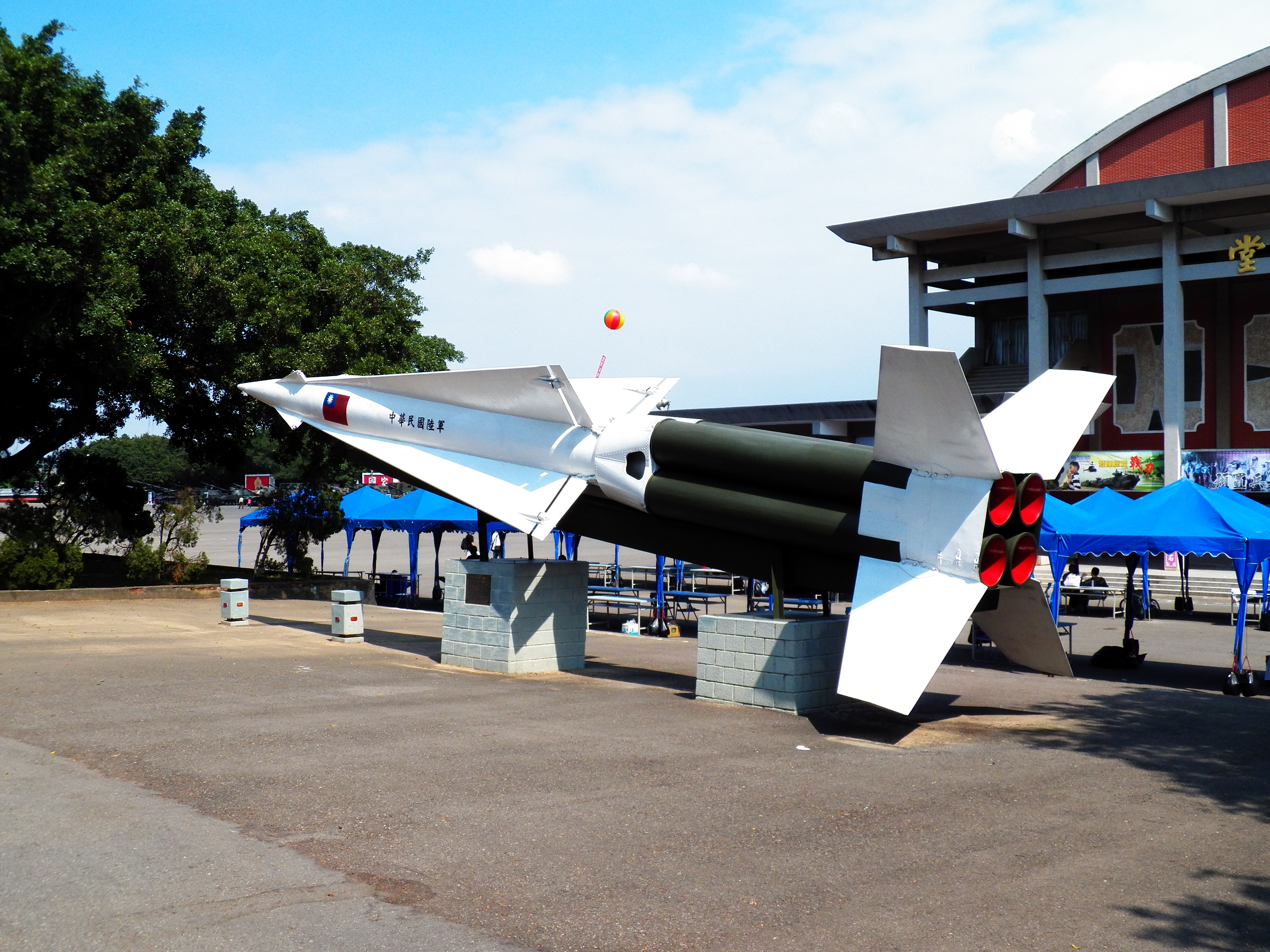
Nike Hercules on display at Chengkungling

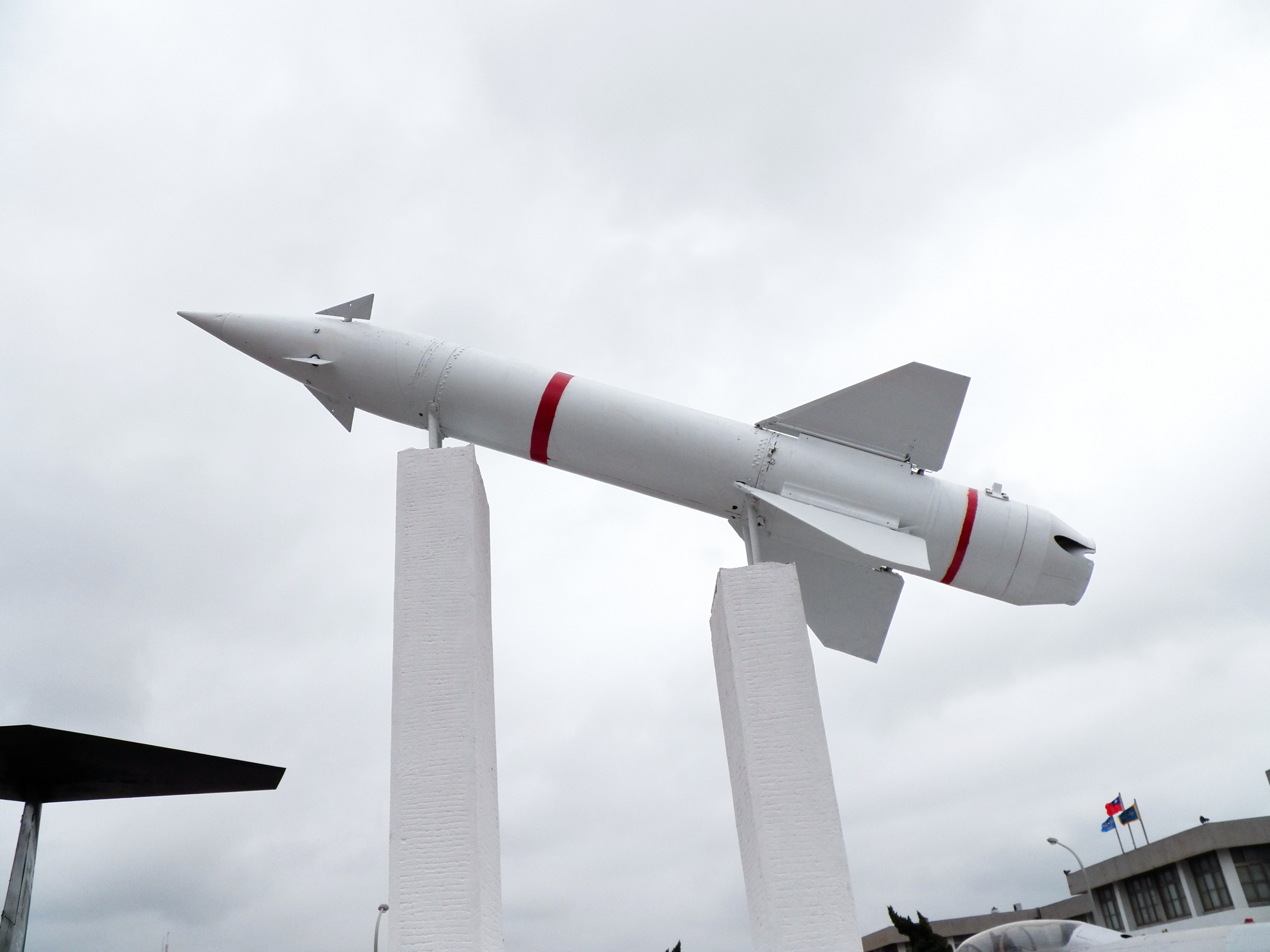
AGM-12 Bullpup Missile Display at Hsinchu AFB

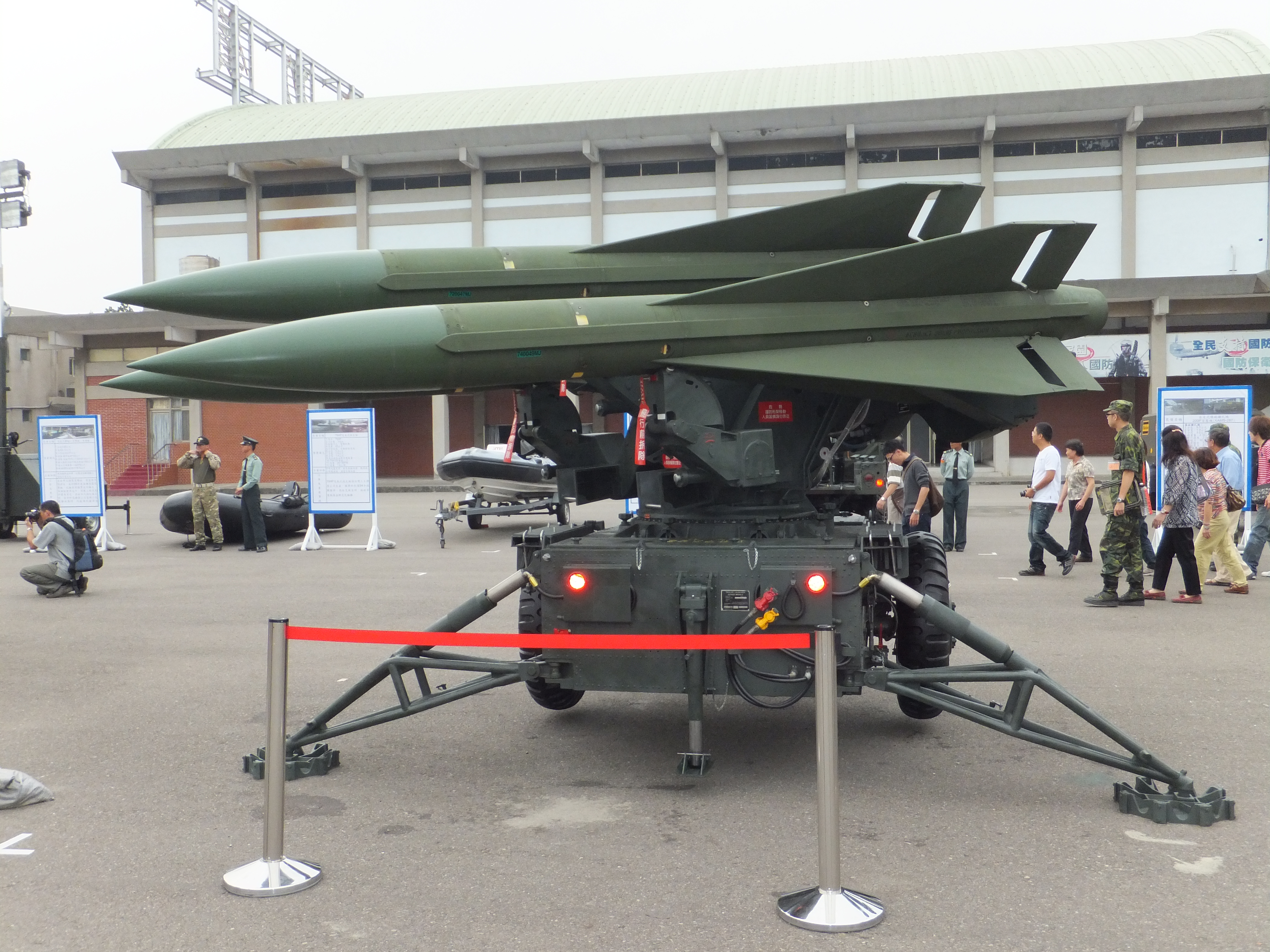
MIM-23 Hawk launcher

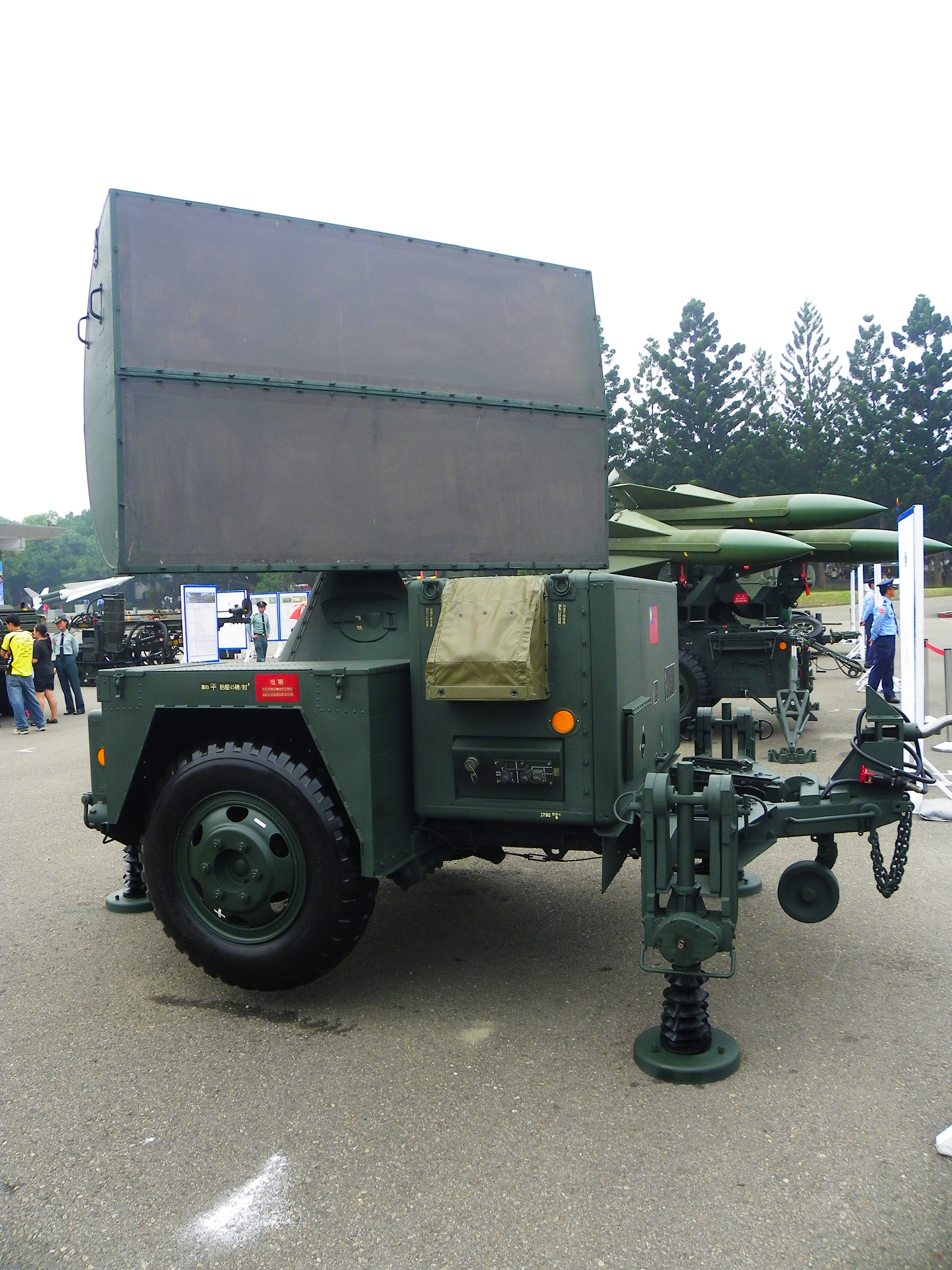
Hawk Missile CWAR Radar

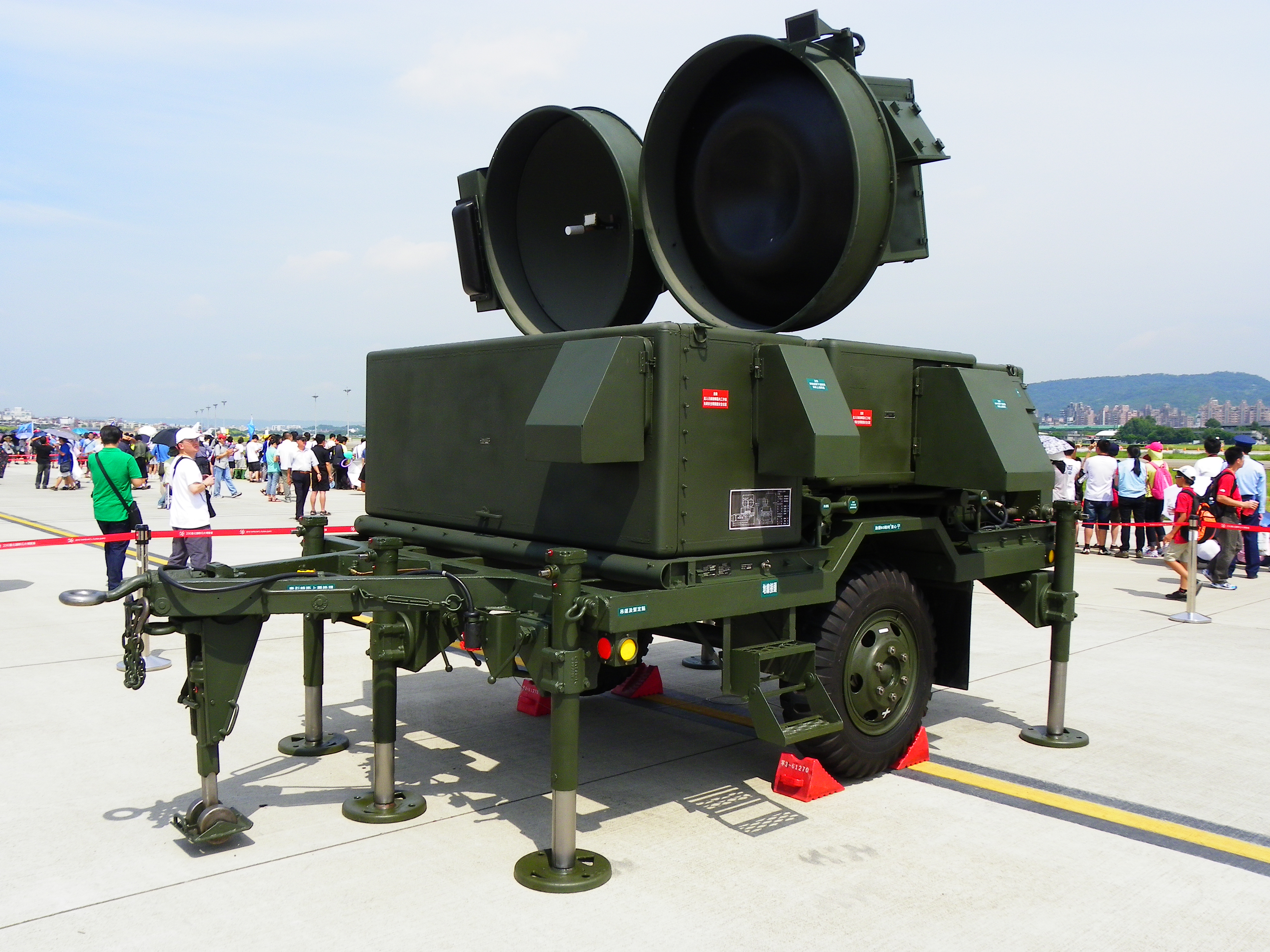
Hawk missile illumination radar

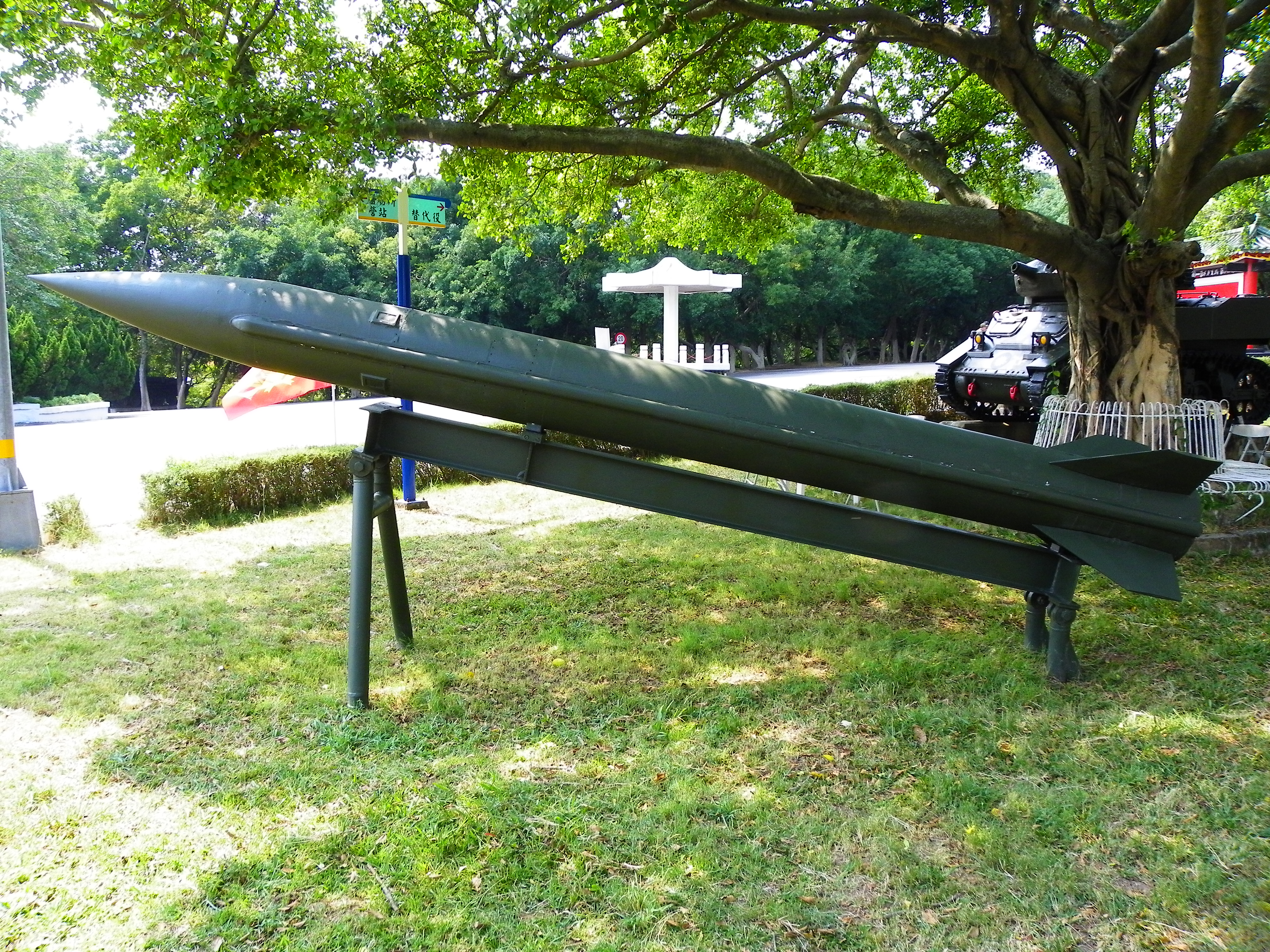
TK-1 surface-to-air missile

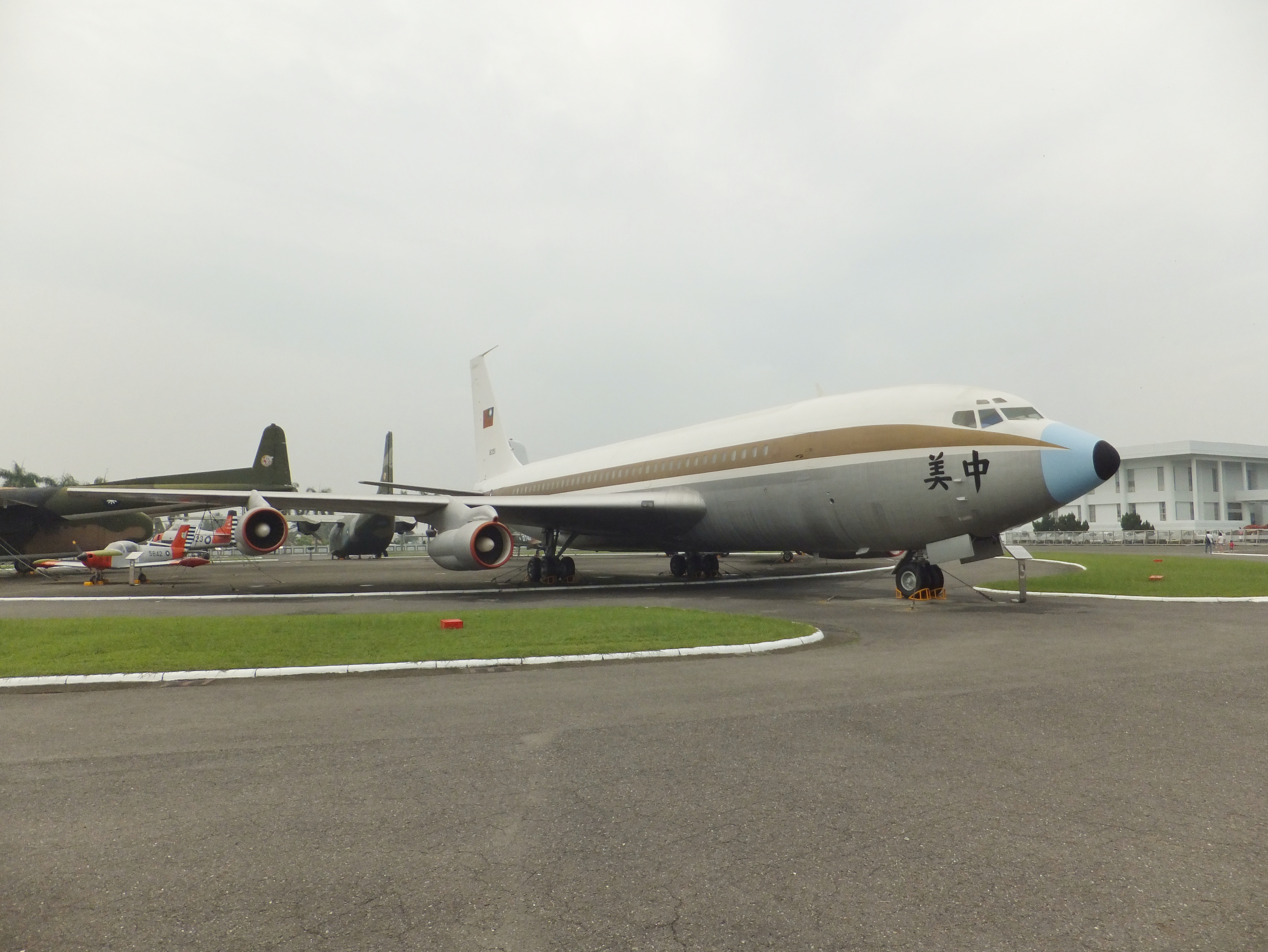
ROCAF B-720 Chung-Mei Special Mission Plane

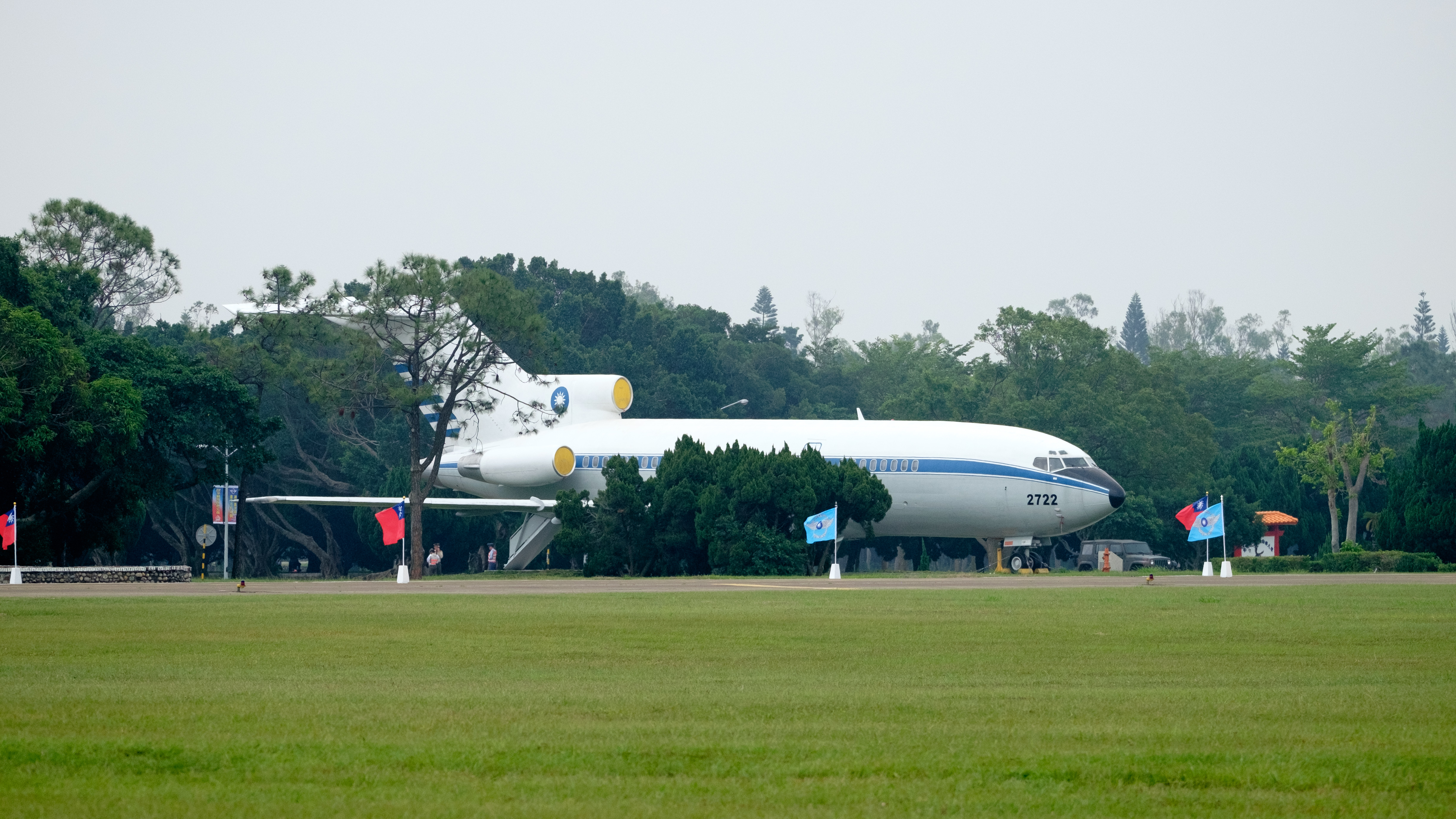
ROCAF Boeing 727-100 2722 at Ching Chuan Kang Air Base

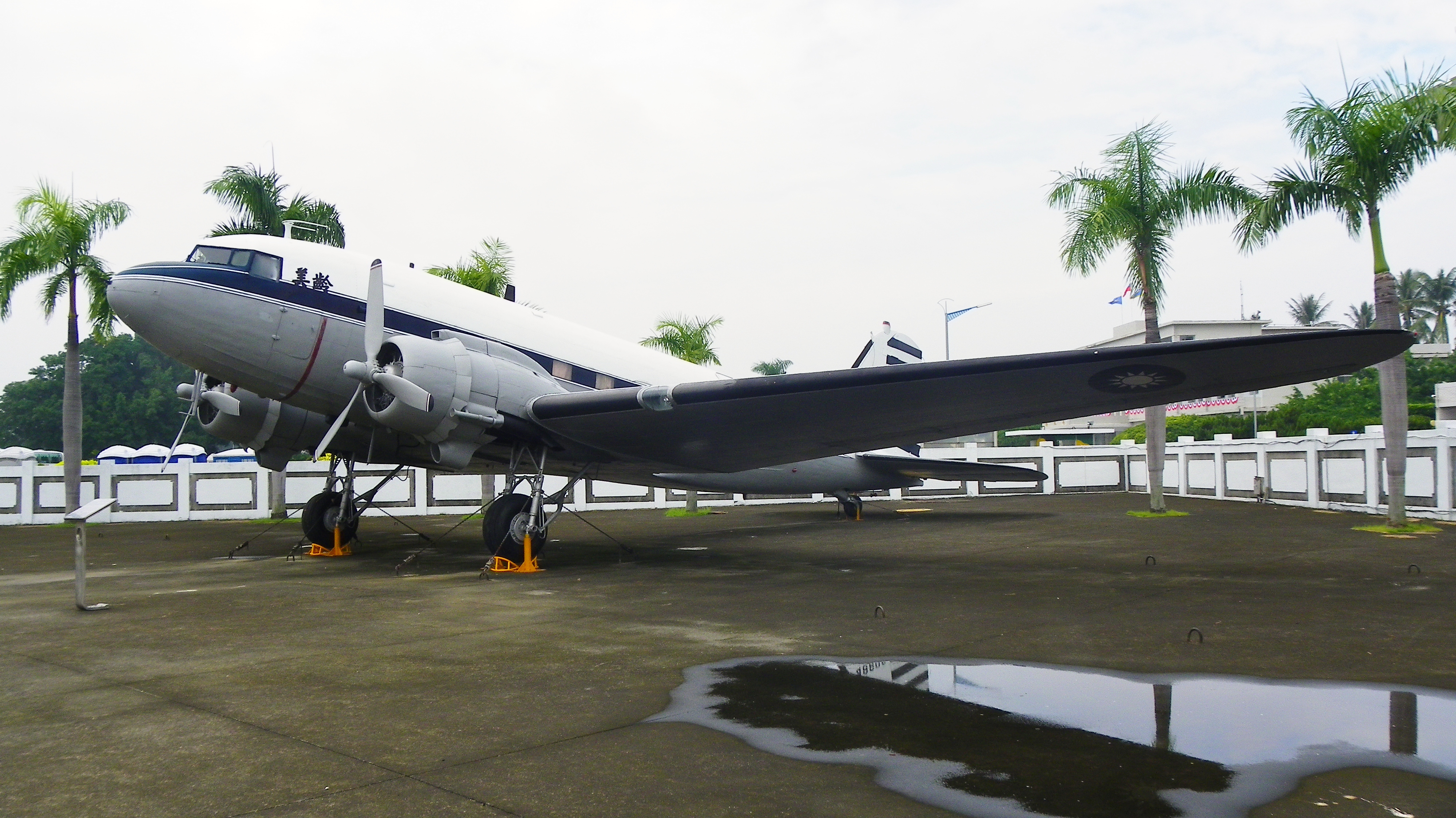
ROCAF C-47 Mei-Lin Special Mission Plane

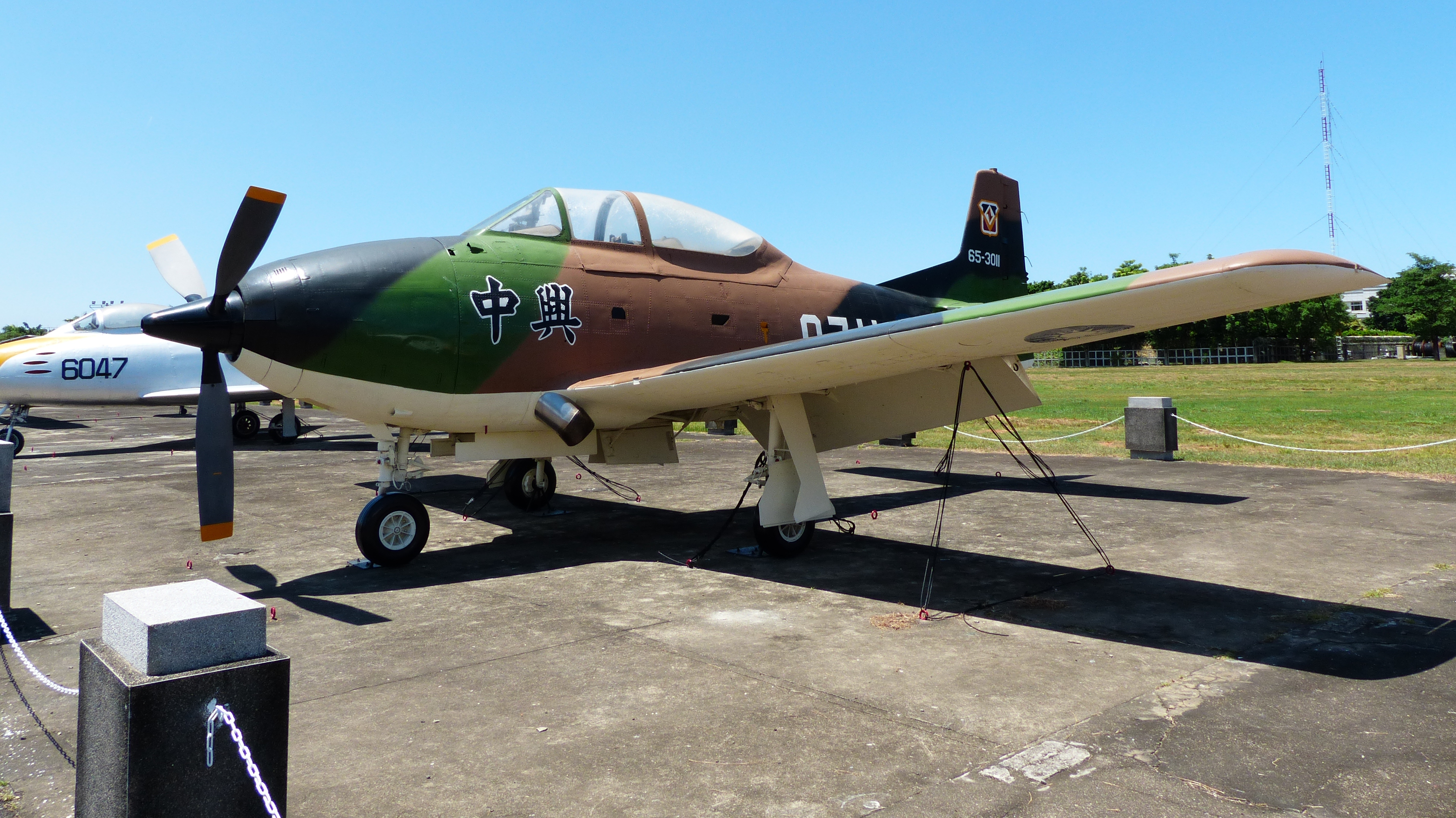
AIDC T-CH-1 at Tainan Air Force Base

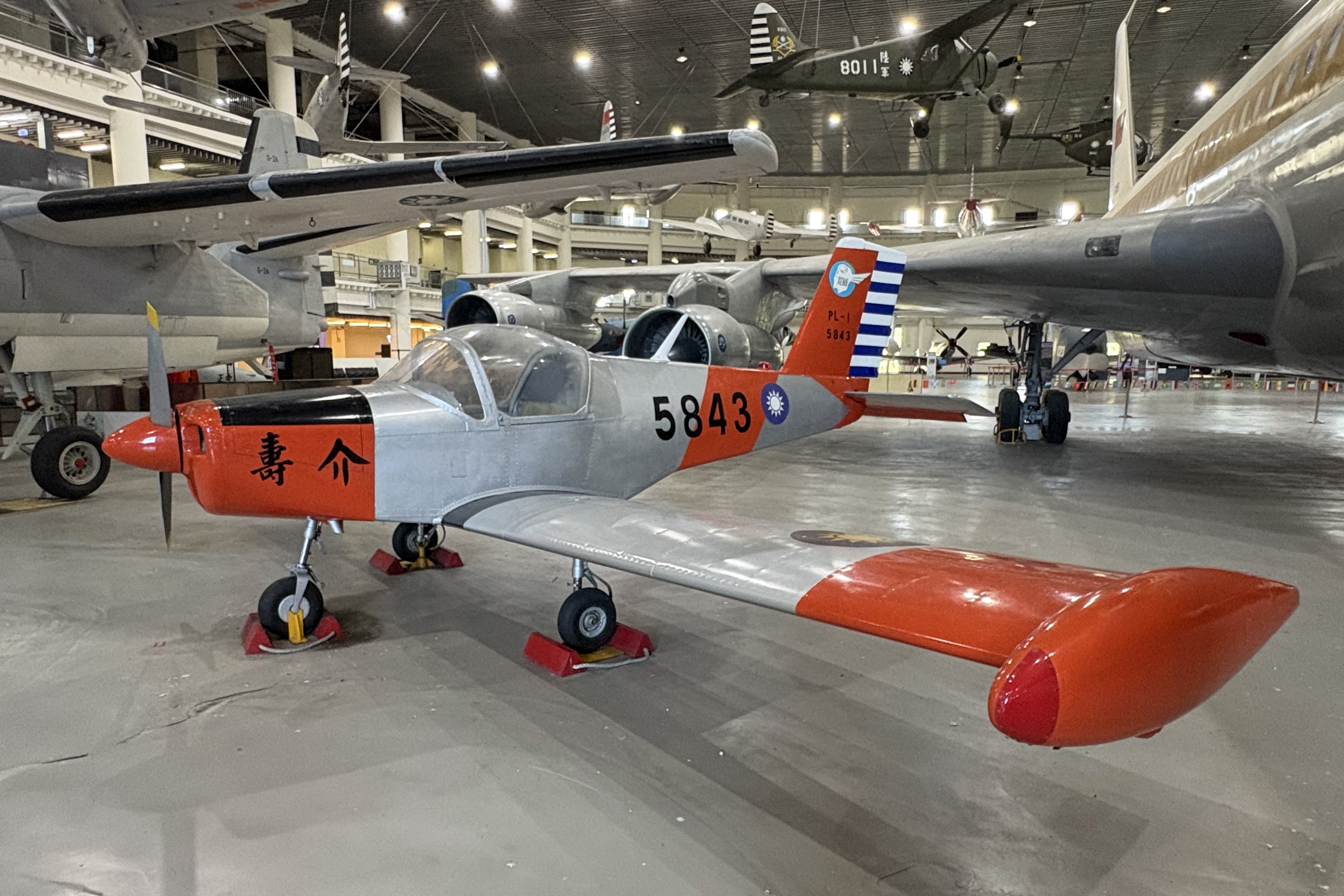
ROCAF PL-1B (5843)

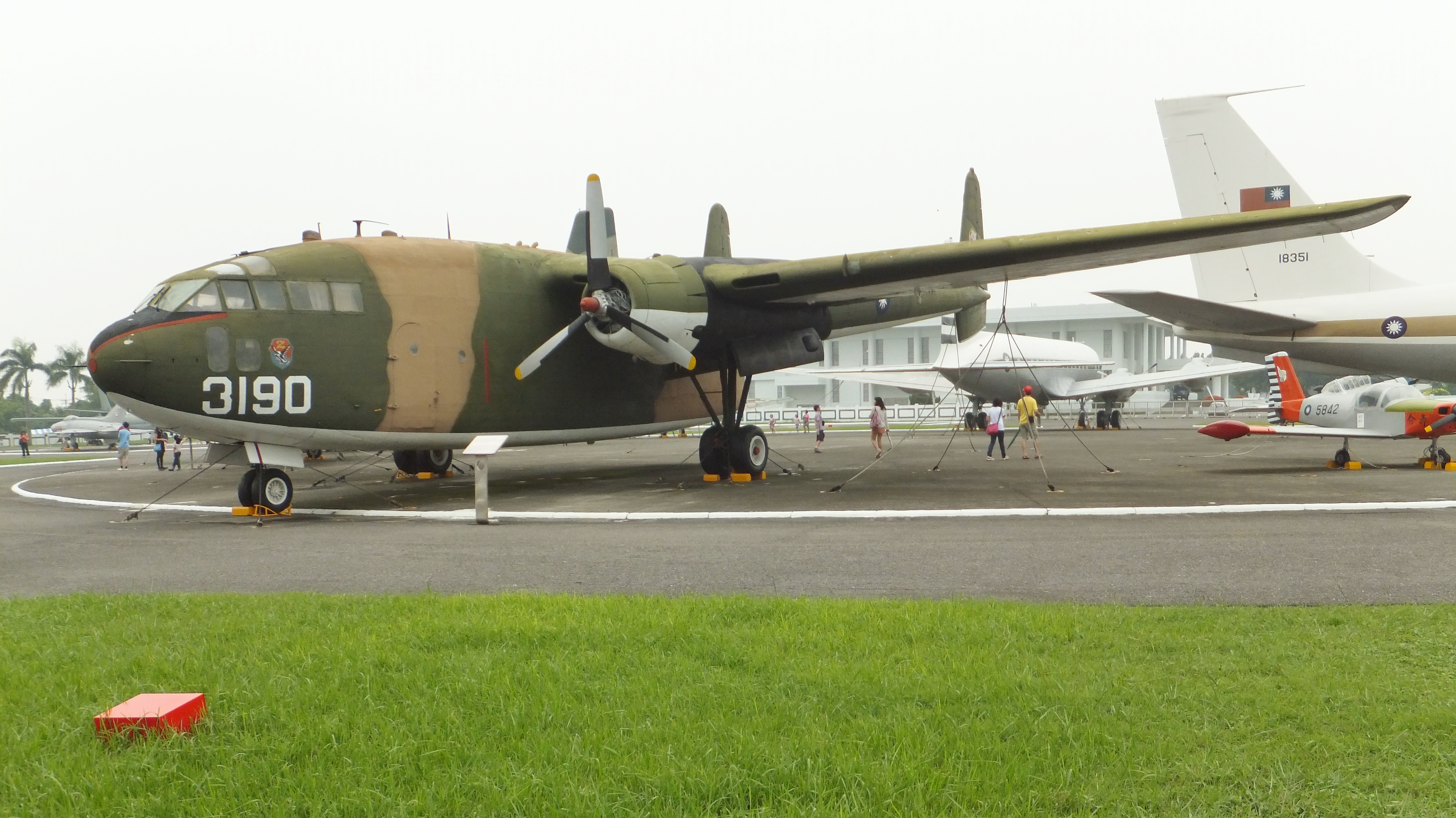
ROCAF C-119

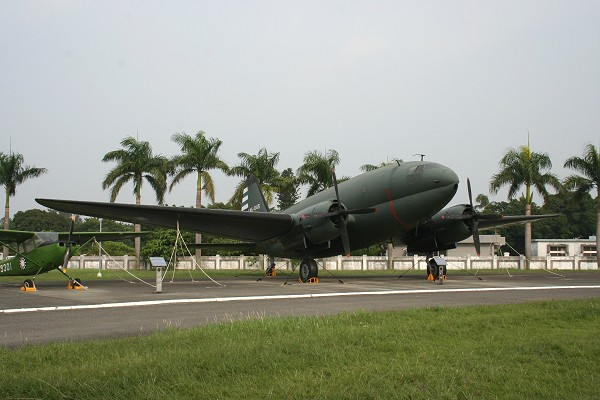
ROCAF C-46

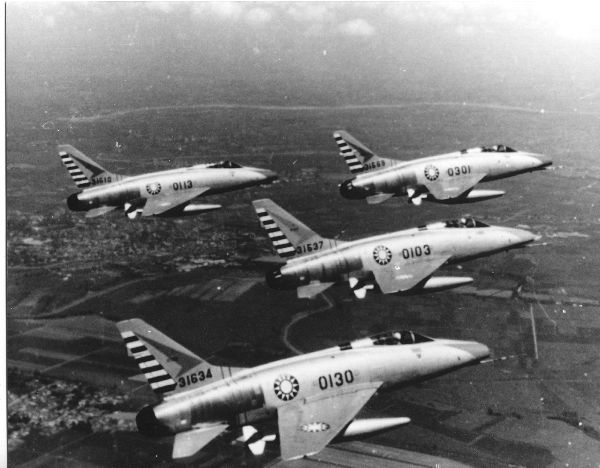
North American F-100 Super Sabres in Taiwanese service

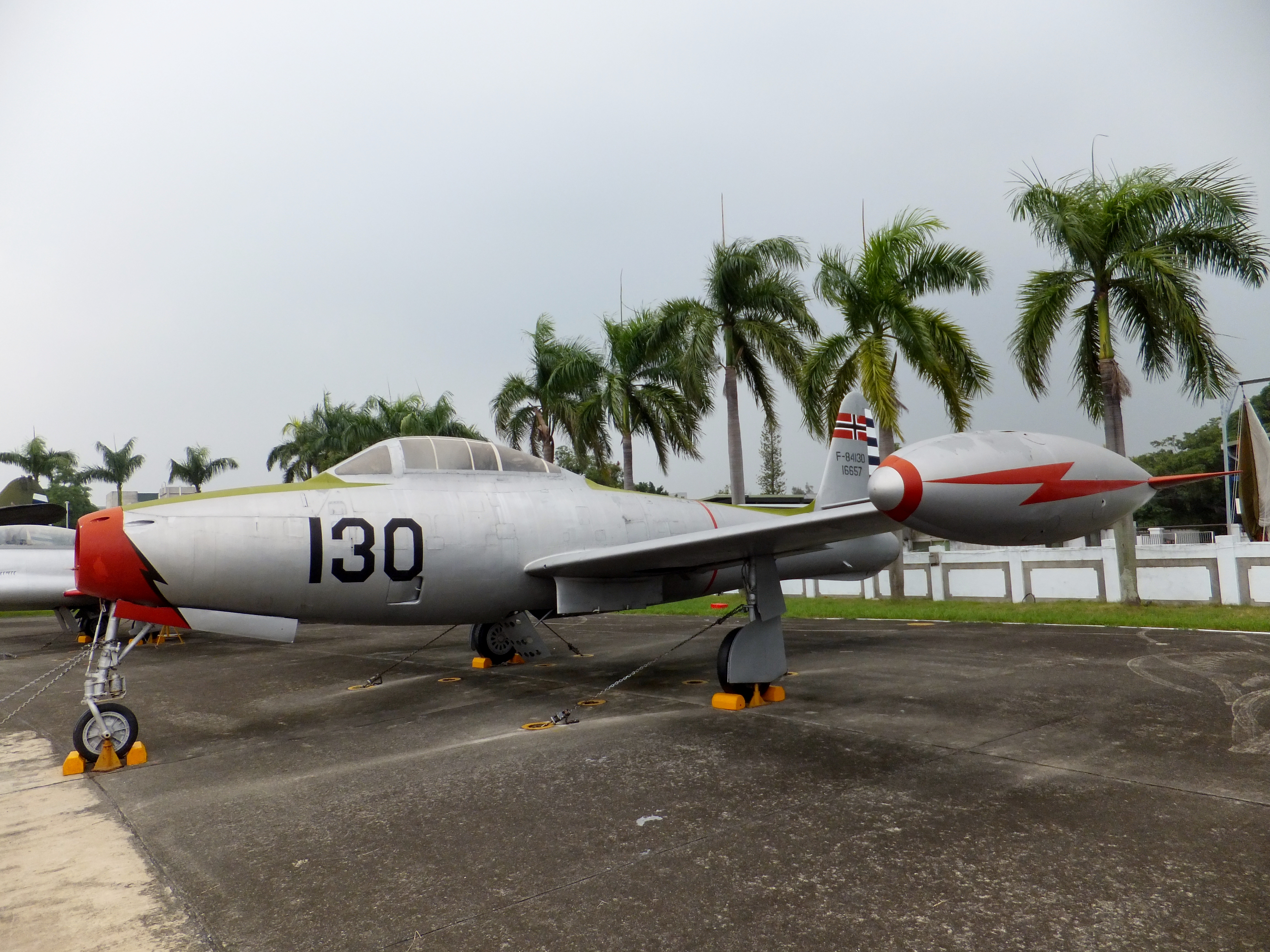
ROCAF Republic F-84 Thunderjet

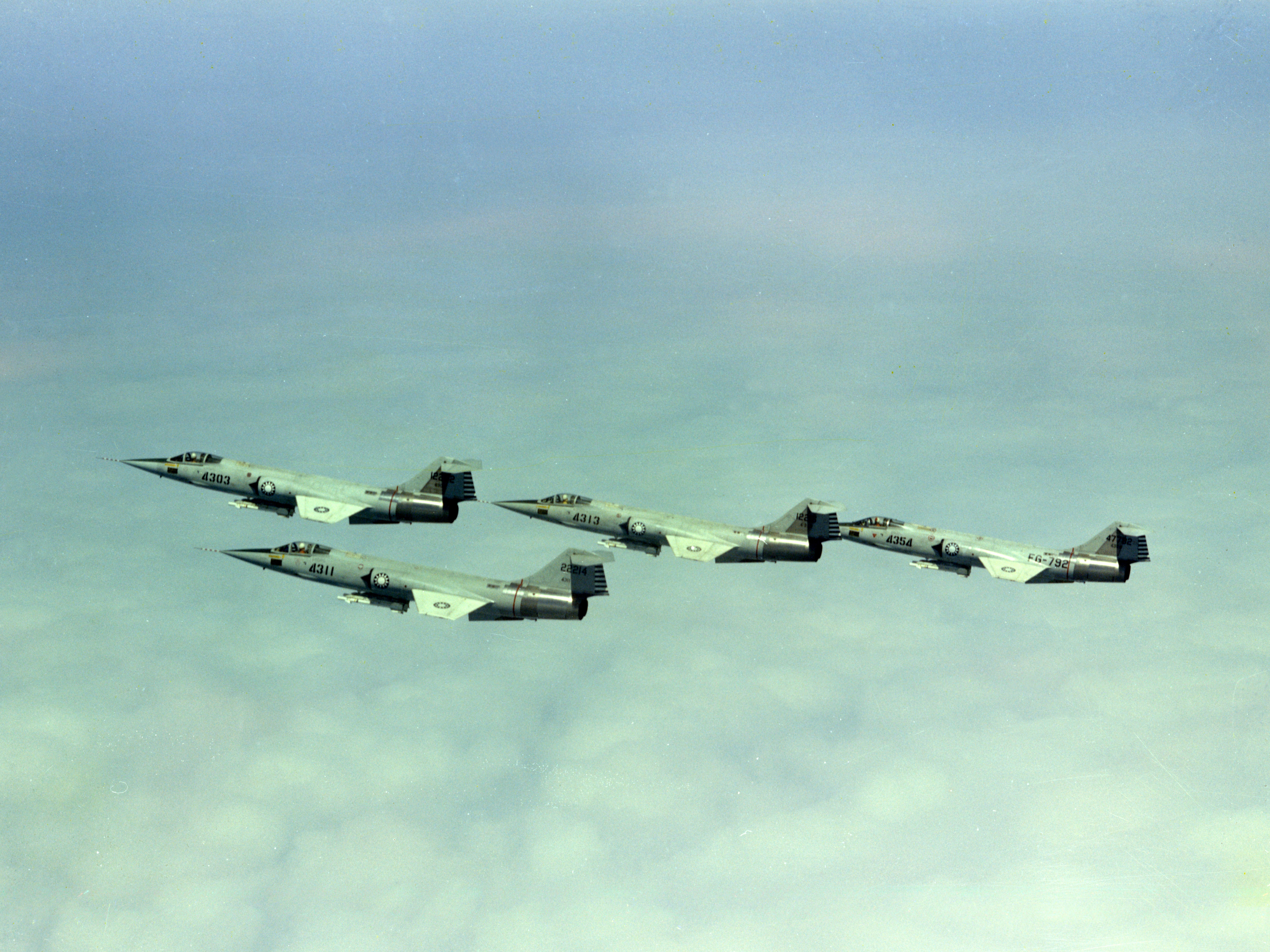
Lockheed F-104G Starfighters in Taiwanese service

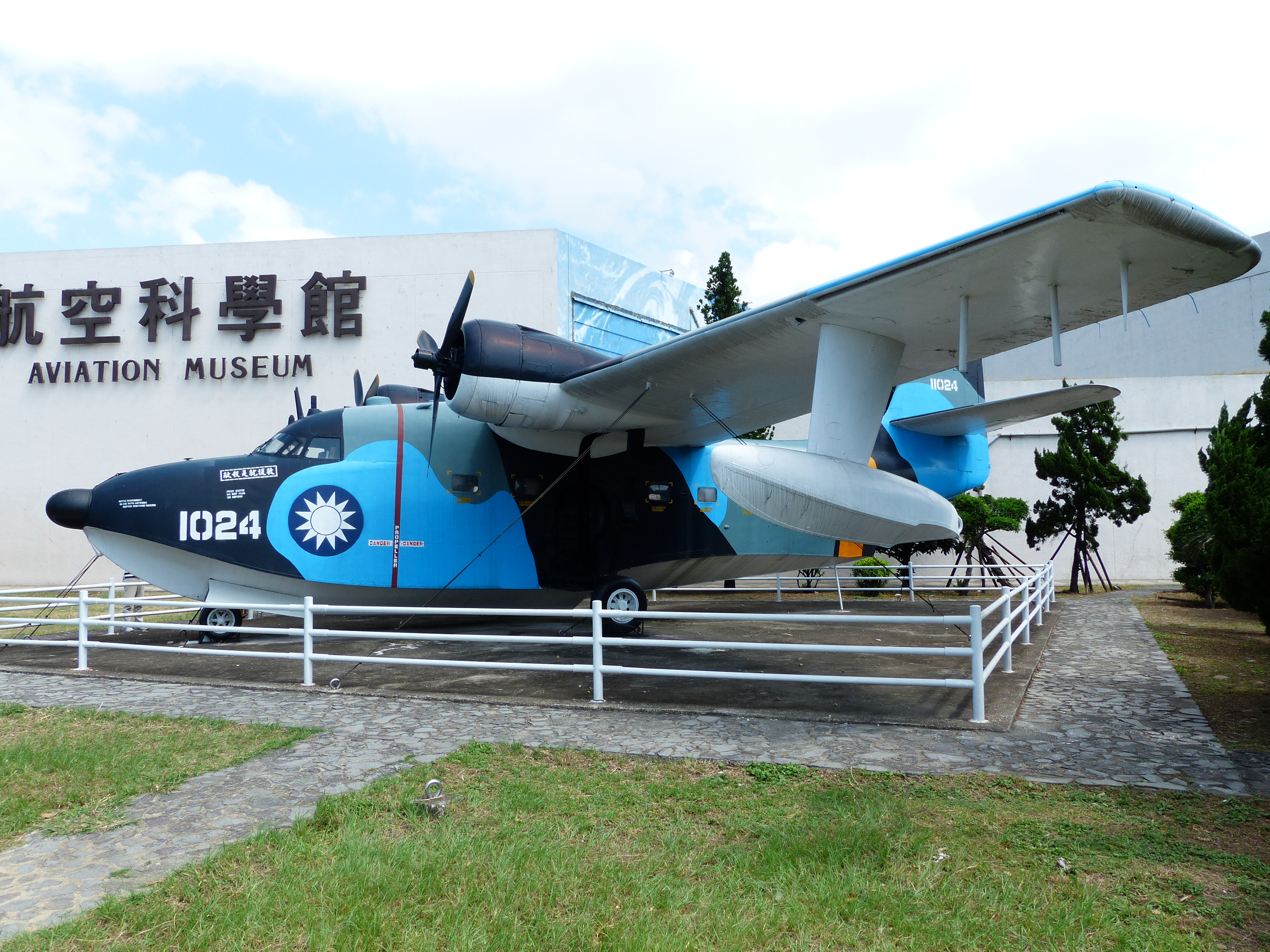
ROCAF Grumman HU-16 Albatross

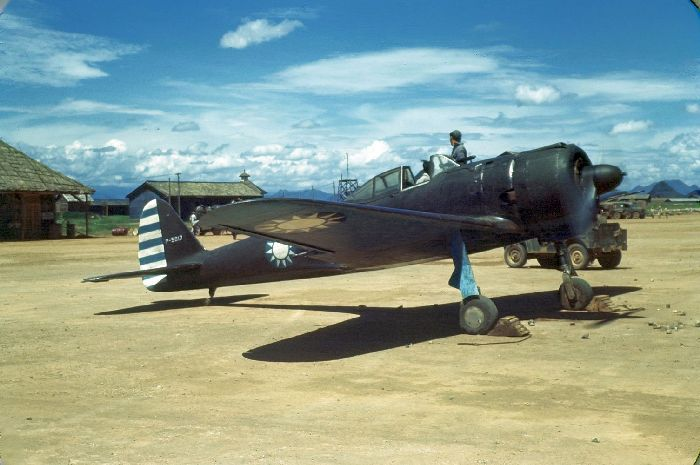
ROCAF Nakajima Ki-43-II

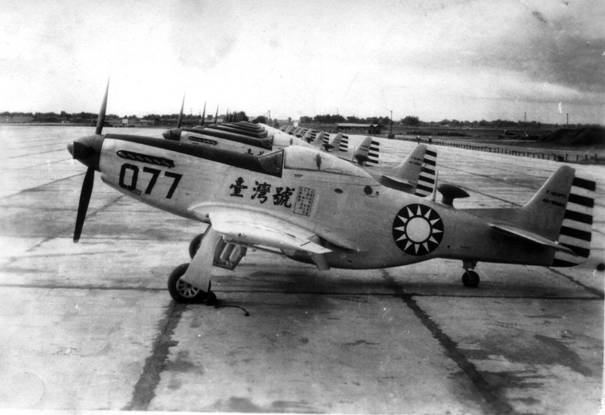
North American P-51 Mustangs in Taiwanese service

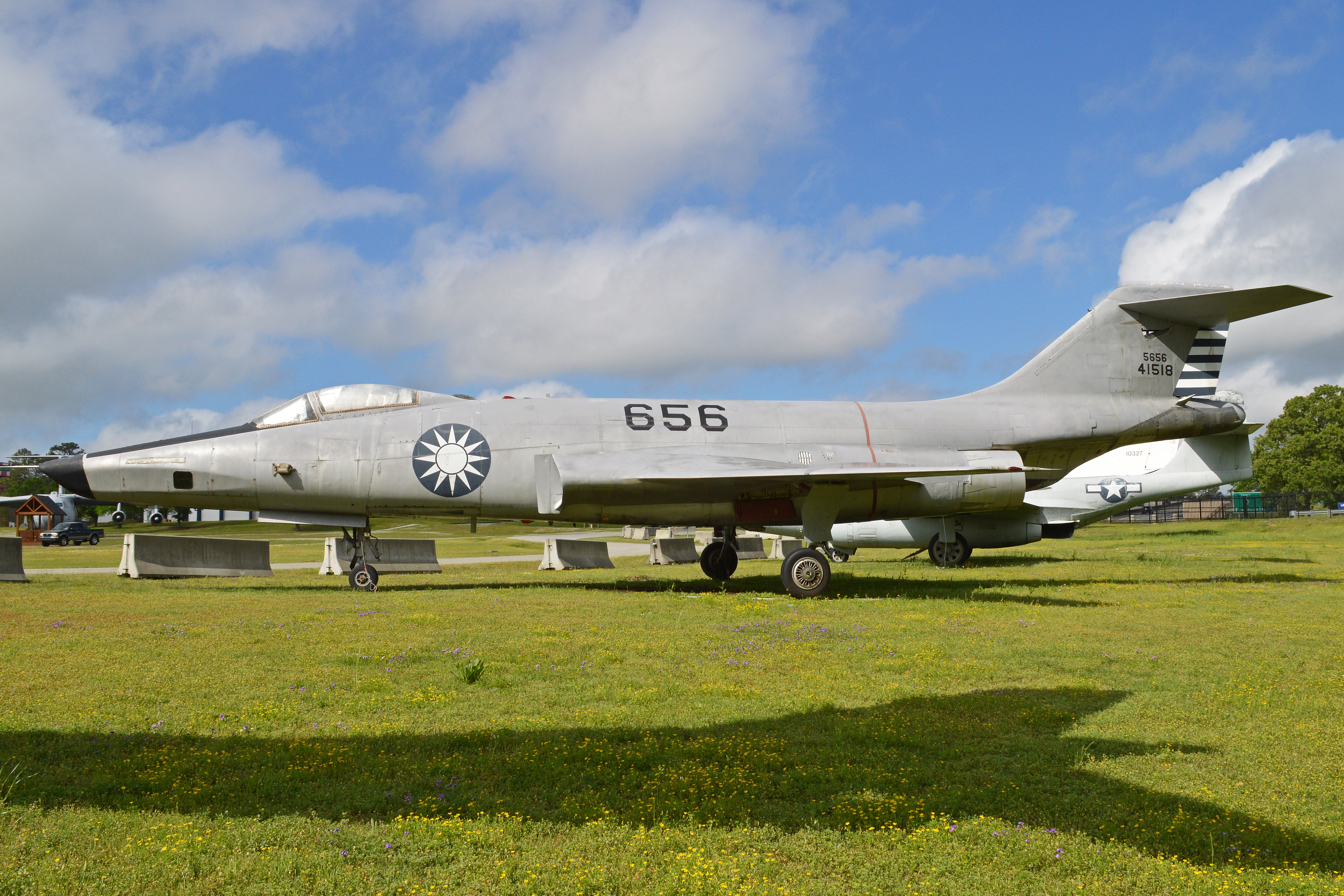
ROCAF McDonnell RF-101C Voodoo

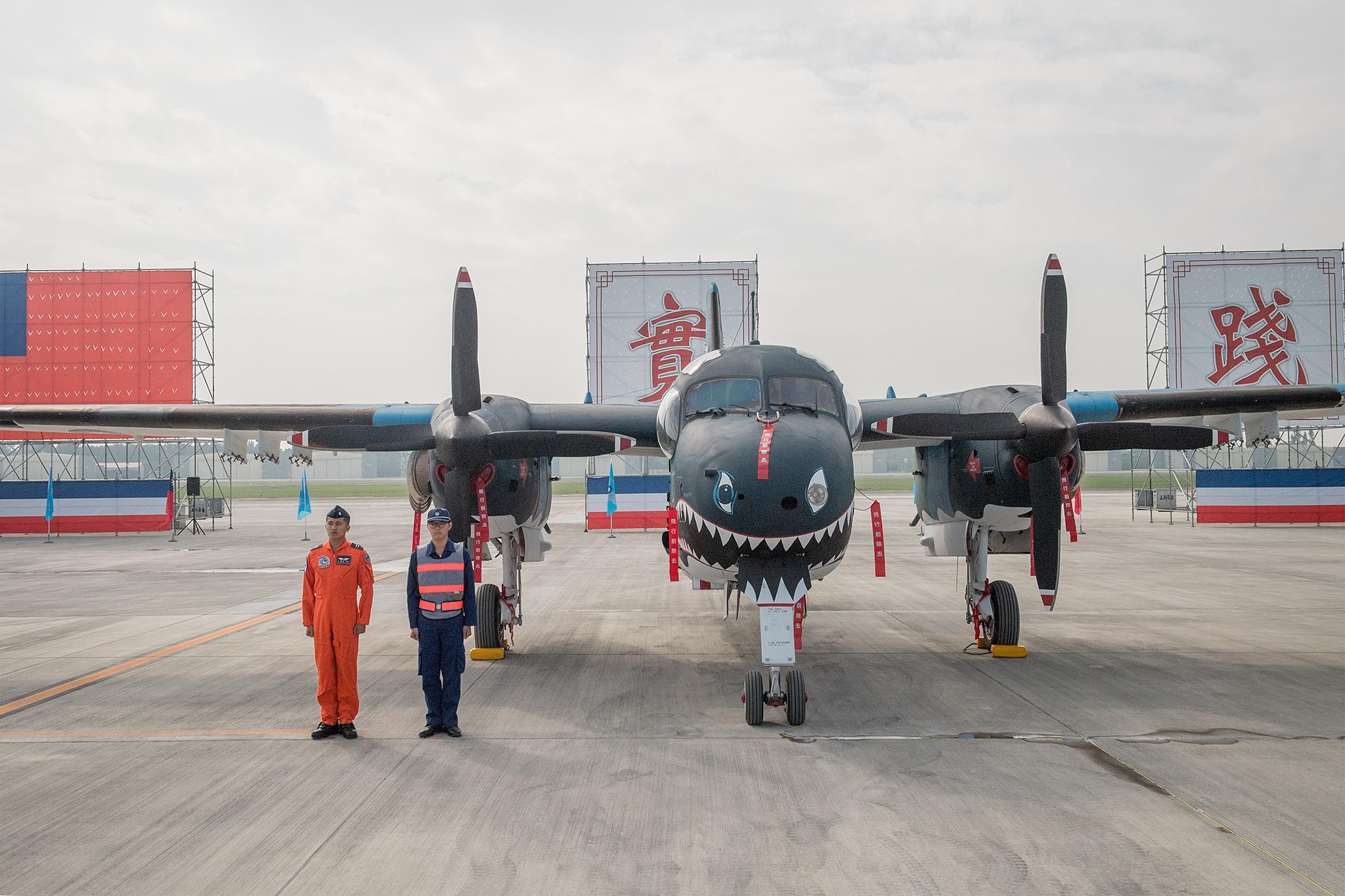
ROCAF Grumman S-2 Tracker

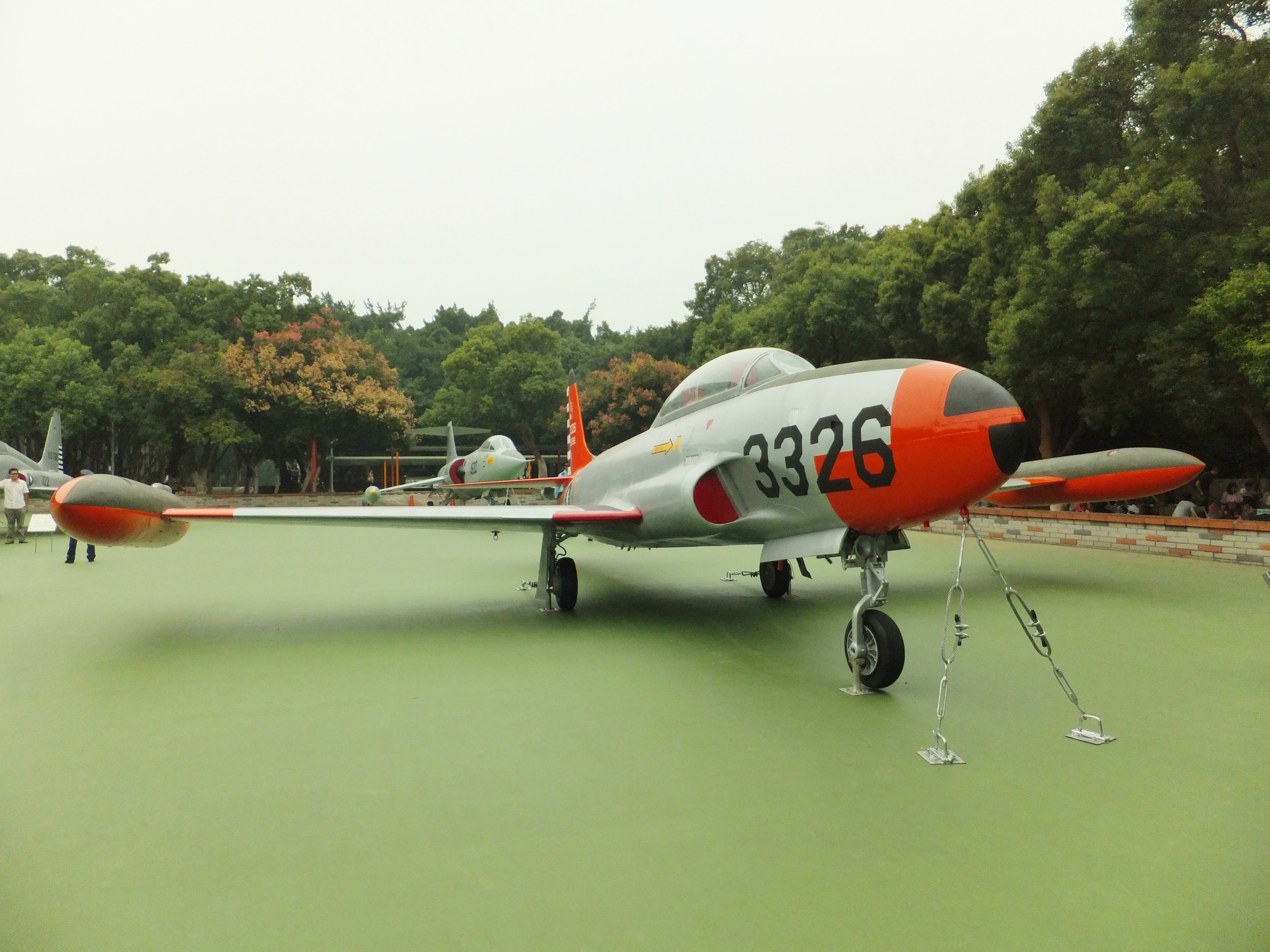
ROCAF Lockheed T-33

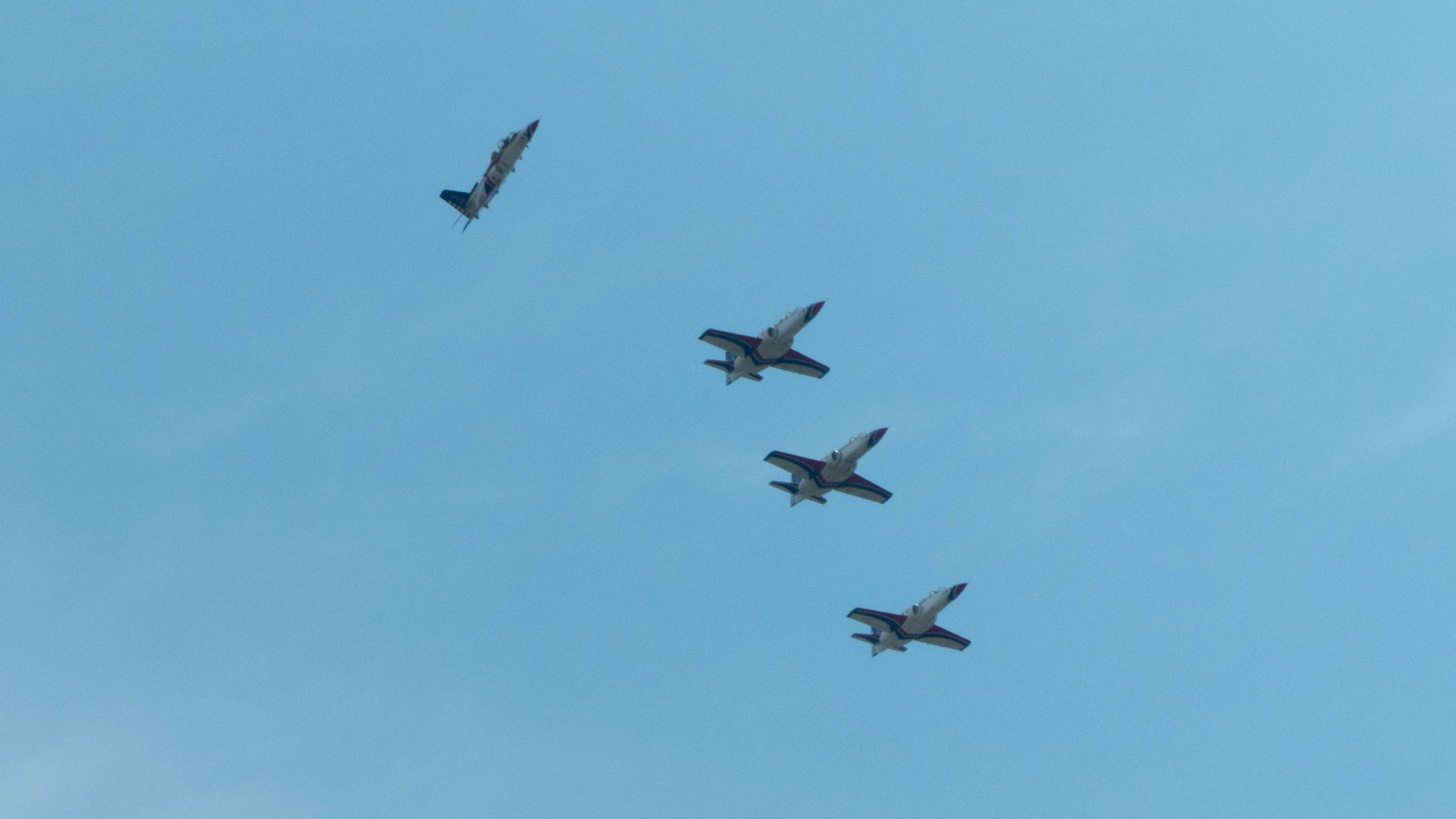
ROCAF AIDC AT-3s in 2017

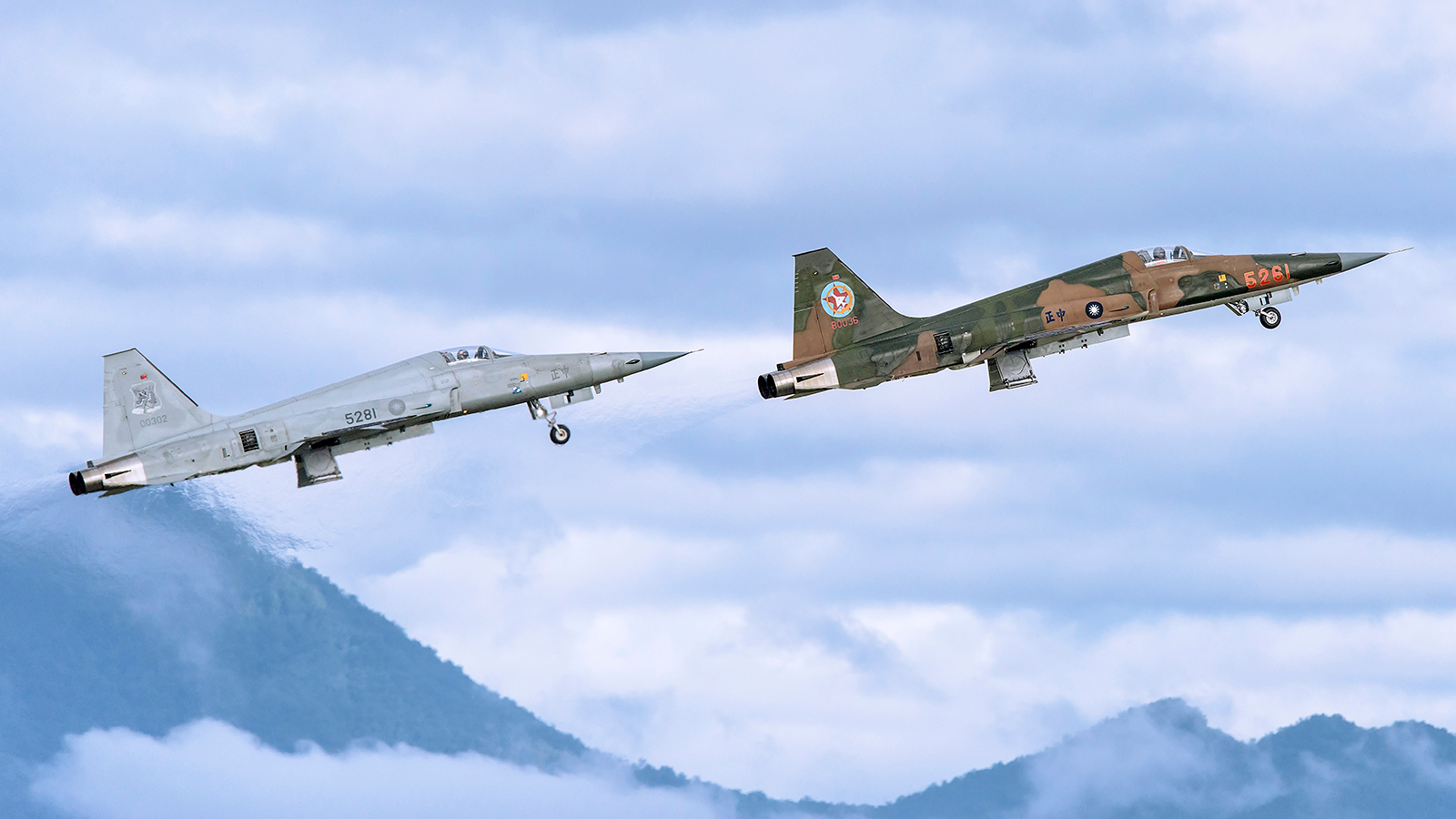
Two ROCAF Northrop F-5E

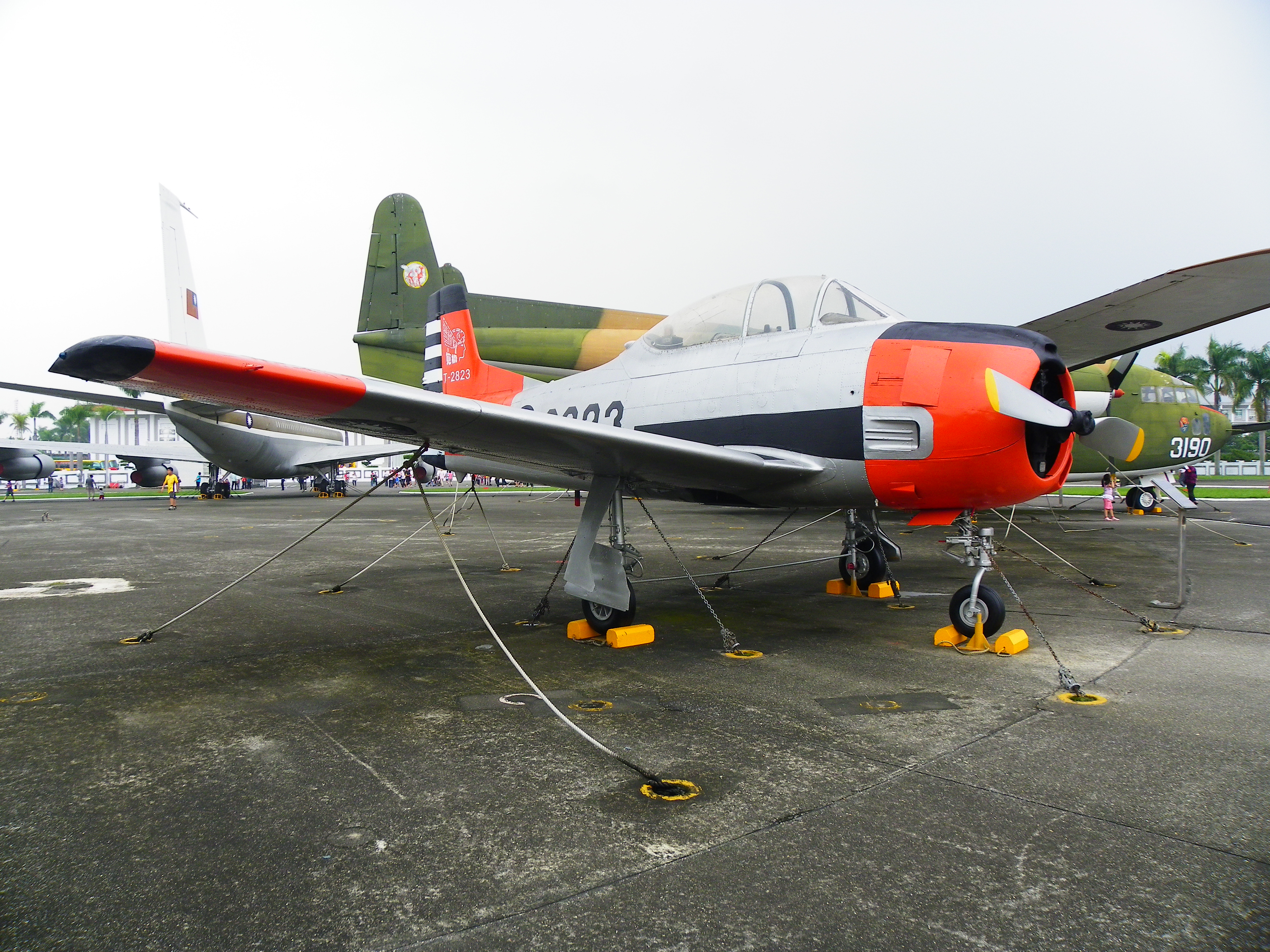
Retired North American T-28 Trojan on display

== See also ==
- Defense industry of Taiwan
- List of equipment of the Republic of China Army
- List of Republic of China Navy ships
- List of equipment of the Republic of China Navy
