= Aerospace industry in Taiwan =

Overview of the aerospace industry of Taiwan

The aerospace industry in Taiwan is a growing sector of civil aviation, defense, and space-related research and development.

As of 2023, Taiwan's aerospace industry employs over 10,000 people and generates over US$4 billion in annual revenue. Major players include Aerospace Industrial Development Corporation, Aero Industry Development Center, and National Chung-Shan Institute of Science and Technology (NCSIST), the latter of which focuses primarily on defense systems. Taiwan also is a significant supplier of aircraft components, particularly for international companies like Boeing, Airbus, Bombardier, and Lockheed Martin. Exports include engine casings, landing gear components, avionics, and flight control systems. According to the Taiwan Aerospace Industry Association (TAIA), approximately 70% of Taiwan’s aerospace output is destined for export markets.

== History ==
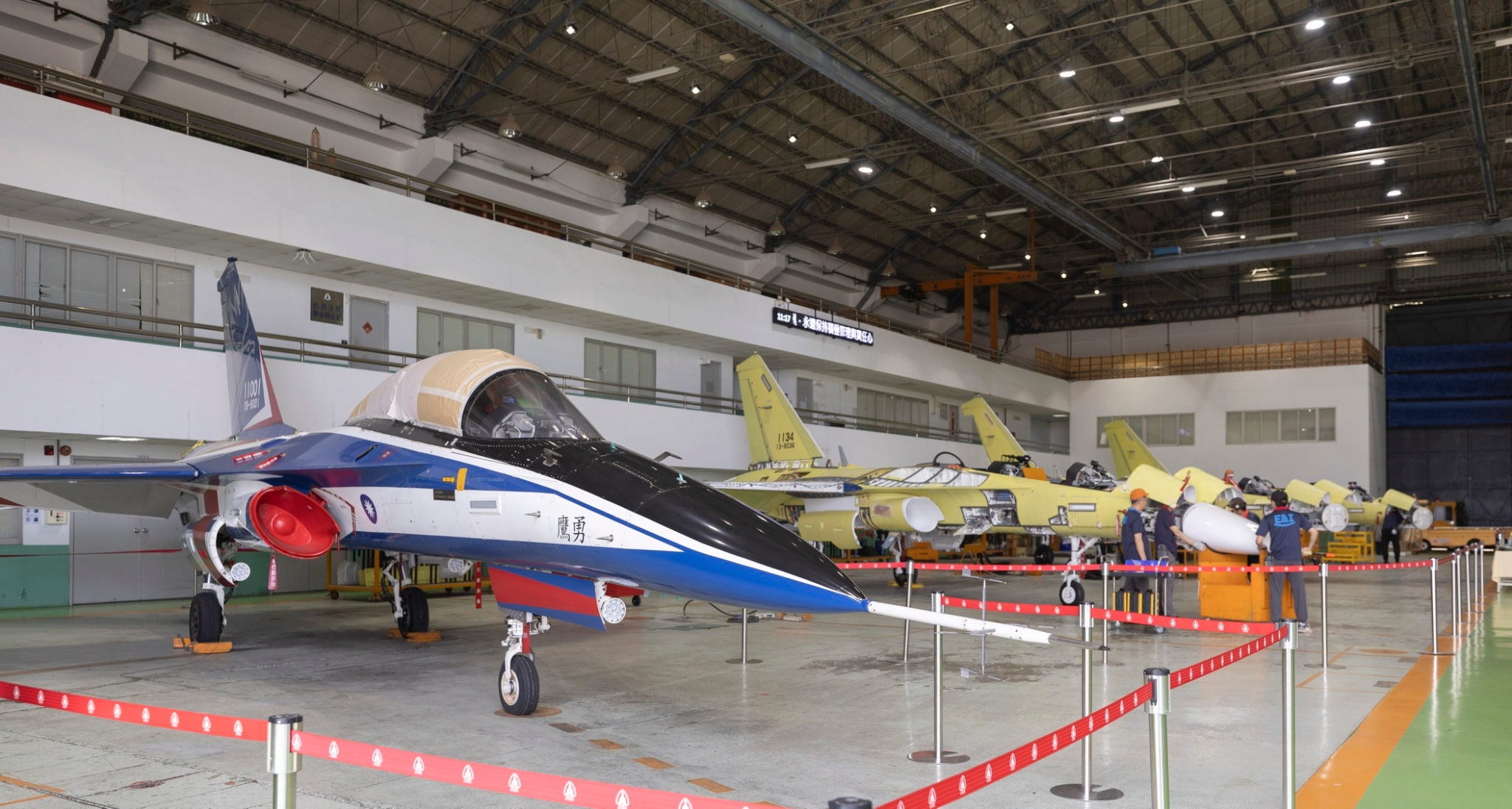
AIDC T-5 Brave Eagle production

Initially, aerospace development was established by the Aerospace Industrial Development Corporation, which firstly starte as a way to support the nation’s defense capabilities. Early activities focused on military aircraft maintenance and modification under the Ministry of National Defense.

In the 1980s and 1990s, Taiwan began producing the AIDC F-CK-1 Ching-kuo Indigenous Defense Fighter. Taiwan also started supplying commercial aircraft for the global supply chain.

== Defense Aerospace ==
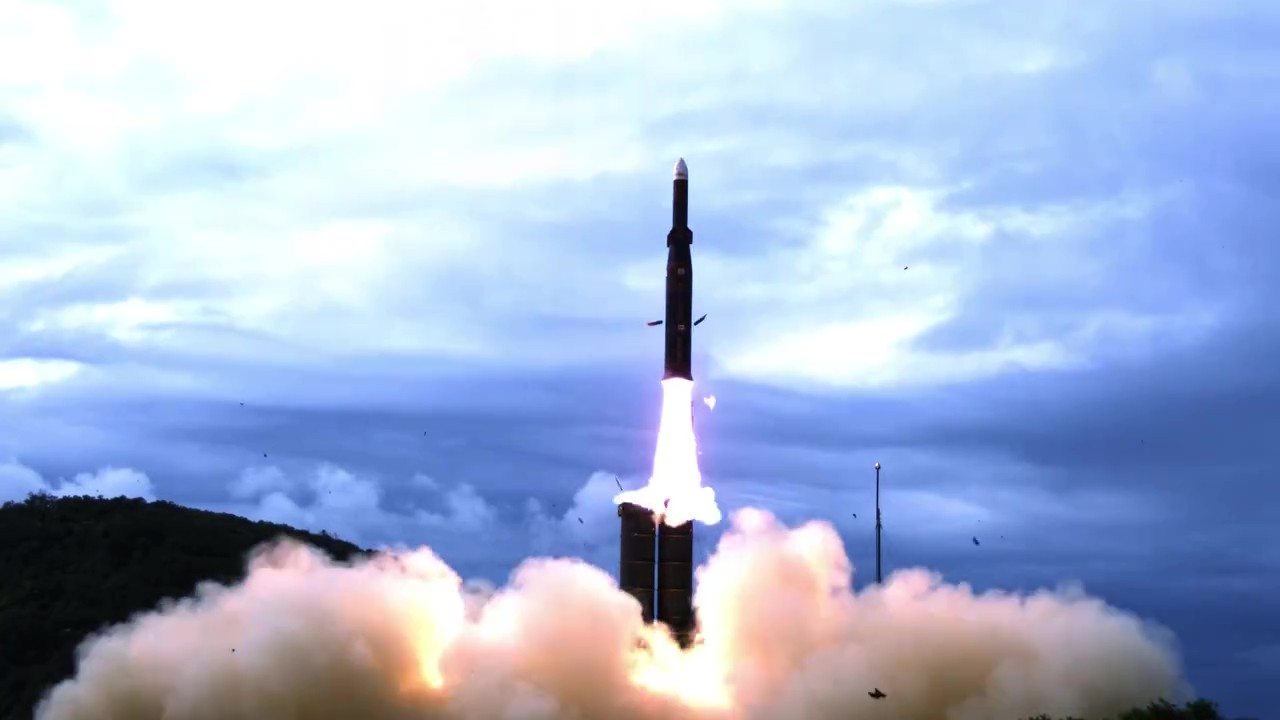
Launch of a TK-4 anti-ballistic missile

The DPP government has invested in indigenous defense programmes, including the development of the Indigenous Defense Fighter and the Teng Yun Unmanned aerial vehicle.

== Space and Satellite Technology ==
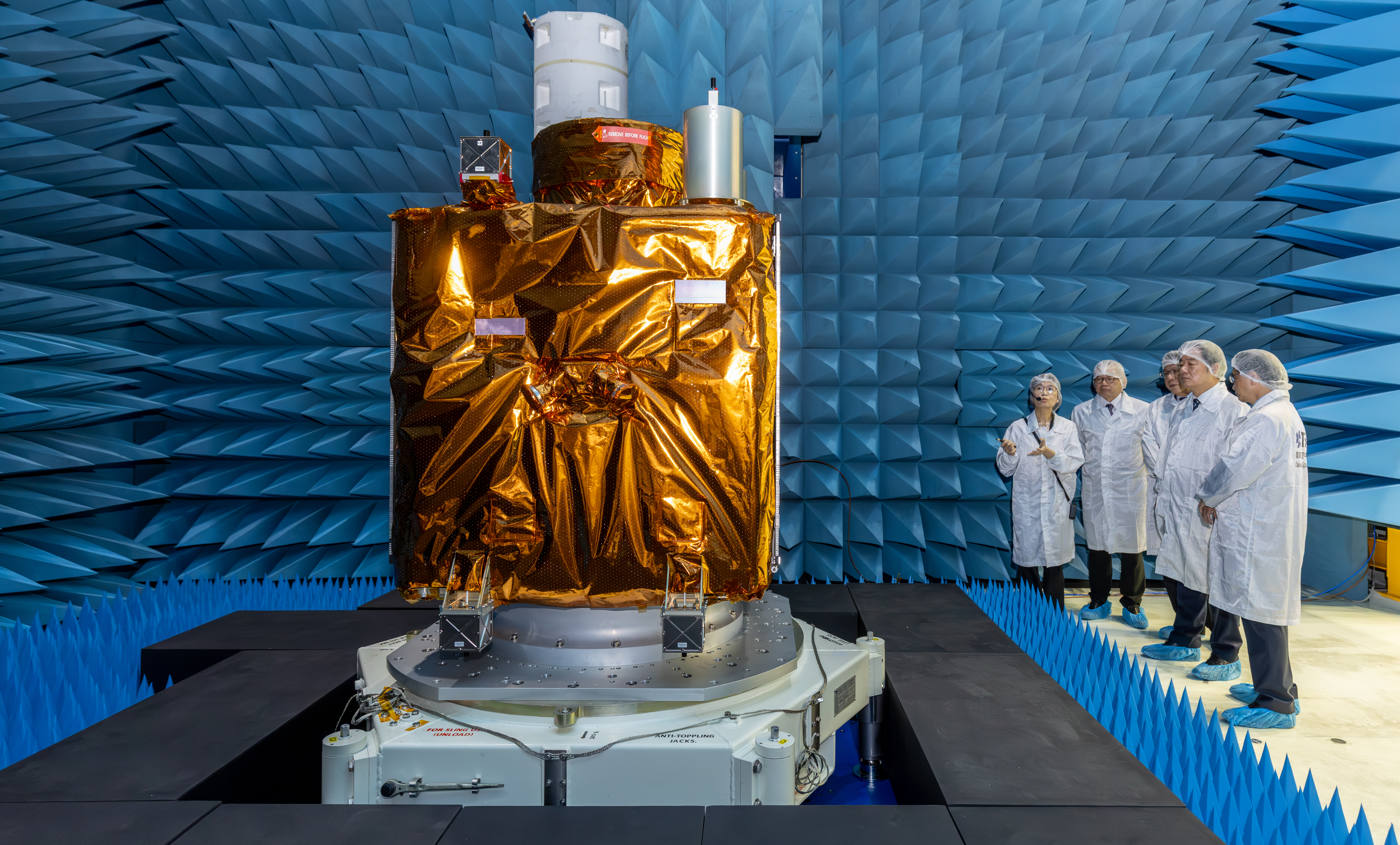
A Formosat-8 satellite

The Taiwan Space Agency oversees satellite development and launch programs. Notable achievements include the launch of the Formosat satellite series.

The government launched the Third Phase National Space Program (2020–2028), committing over NT$25 billion (US$800 million) to bolster satellite and launch capabilities, and to foster a domestic space supply chain.

== Market and exports ==
Taiwan also participates in major exhibitions, such as Xponential in Houston, where TEDIBOA signed a memorandum of understanding with the Association for Uncrewed Vehicle Systems International (AUVSI) and the Oklahoma Defense Industry Association in May 2025.

TEDIBOA and Taiwan’s delegation signed two MOUs with the Estonian Defence and Aerospace Industry Association and the Estonia Aviation Cluster on drone, aerospace, and defense cooperation. These collaborations are part of Taiwan’s broader strategy to build democratically-aligned aerospace supply chains and reduce reliance on China.

In 2025 Poland became Taiwan's biggest international market for drones and drone components as Poland looked to move away from Chinese drones and components as a result of the Russo-Ukrainian War. The government rolled out a new series of rules and regulations for drone importers and exporters to meet the needs of the growing sector.

== Future Prospects ==
Taiwan’s Ministry of Economic Affairs has identified aerospace as a strategic industry for technological upgrading and export growth. Policies promote clustering of aerospace companies in technology parks such as the Taichung Precision Machinery Park and the Southern Taiwan Science Park. New investments aim to integrate advanced manufacturing techniques such as additive manufacturing, AI-based diagnostics for MRO, and sustainable aviation technology. The development of next-generation drones, electric aircraft systems, and nano-satellites are also areas of focus.

=== Incentives ===
In 2025 the National Taipei University of Technology partnered with the Taiwan Space Agency, Institute for Information Industry, and Industrial Technology Research Institute to offer a three year intensive program in satellite communications technology.

== See also ==
- Aerospace Industrial Development Corporation
- Economy of Taiwan
- Civil Aviation Administration (Taiwan)
- Defense industry of Taiwan
- Taiwan Space Agency
- AIDC F-CK-1 Ching-kuo
- Tensor Tech
- Thunder Tiger
- DronesVision
