= Formosat-1 =

Taiwanese Earth observation satellite

Formosat-1 ROCSAT-1 福爾摩沙衛星一號
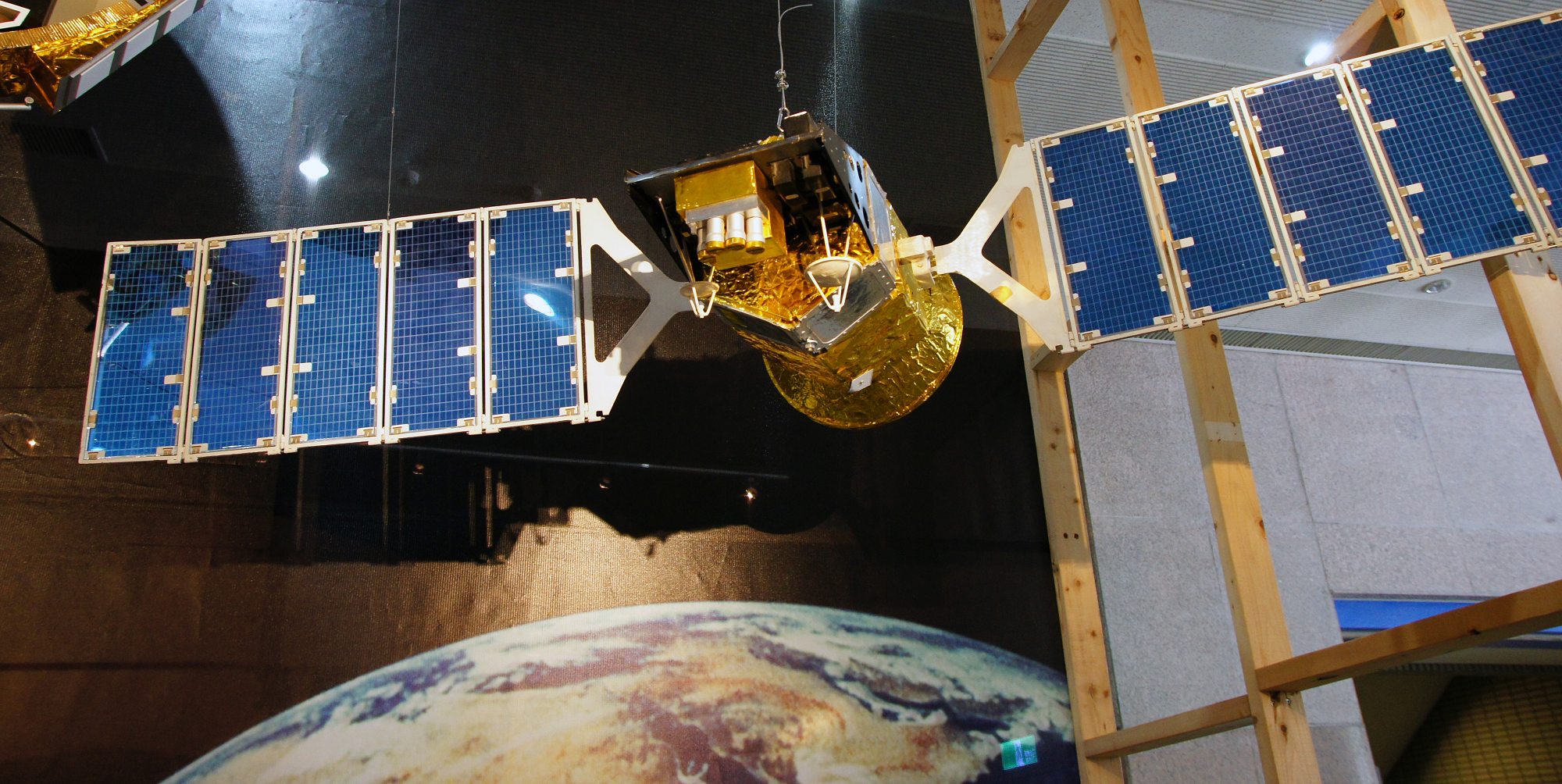
- Mission type: Science
- Operator: National Space Organization
- COSPAR ID: 1999-002A
- SATCAT no.: 25616
- Website: Formosat-1
- Mission duration: 5.5 years

Spacecraft properties
- BOL mass: 401 kg

Start of mission
- Launch date: Jan 27, 1999
- Rocket: ATHENA-1/LMLV1

End of mission
- Decay date: 22 May 2023

Orbital parameters
- Reference system: Geocentric
- Inclination: 35°
- Period: 96.7 mins

Formosat-1 (Chinese: 福爾摩沙衛星一號; pinyin: Fúěrmóshā wèixīng yīhào, formerly known as ROCSAT-1) was an Earth observation satellite operated by the National Space Program Office (NSPO; now the Taiwan Space Agency) of the Republic of China (Taiwan) to conduct observations of the ionosphere and oceans. The spacecraft and its instrumentation were developed jointly by NSPO and TRW using TRW's Lightsat bus, and was launched from Cape Canaveral Air Force Station, US, by Lockheed Martin on January 27, 1999. Formosat-1 provided 5½ years of operational service. The spacecraft ended its mission on June 17, 2004 and was decommissioned on July 16, 2004.

== Technical details ==
=== Spacecraft ===
- Weight: 401 kg
- Shape: Hexagonal
- Dimensions
  - Height: 2.1 m
  - Diameter: 1.1 m
- Solar arrays: Two, 1.16 x 2.46 m
- Electrical power: 450 watts

=== Instrumentation ===
- Experimental Communication Payload (ECP)
- Ionosphere Plasma Electrodynamics Instrument (IPEI)
- Ocean Color Imager (OCI)

=== Orbit ===
- Altitude: 600 km
- Type: Circular
- Inclination: 35 degrees

== See also ==
- FORMOSAT-2
- FORMOSAT-3/COSMIC
