= ONGLAISAT =

Taiwanese satellite

ONGLAISAT (an acronym for "ONboard Globe-Looking And Imaging Satellite") is a CubeSat developed by the Taiwan Space Agency (TASA) in partnership with the University of Tokyo's Intelligent Space Systems Laboratory. It features an experimental off-axis optical system, imaging sensor, and data compression system.

== Name ==
ONGLAISAT stands for ONboard Globe-Looking And Imaging Satellite. The combined name also draws from Hokkien to render a meaning of "pineapple" 王梨; ông-lâi and "prosperous" 旺來; ông lâi as a reference to Freedom pineapples which was a contemporary cultural reference when the satellite was being named in 2021.

== History ==
ONGLAISAT was developed by the Taiwan Space Agency (TASA) in partnership with the University of Tokyo's Intelligent Space Systems Laboratory.

ONGLAISAT was launched in November 2024 aboard a SpaceX Falcon 9. By summer 2025 it had accomplished its technical and research goals.

== Technical specifications ==
ONGLAISAT orbits at 400 km.

=== Payloads ===
ONGLAISAT features an experimental off-axis optical system, experimental imaging sensor, and an experimental data compression system. It has a main sensor resolution of 2.5m.

== See also ==
- COSMIC-2
- Formosat-2
- Formosat-8
- PARUS (Taiwanese satellite family)
