= PARUS (Taiwanese satellite family) =

Satellite of Taiwan

PARUS is a family of CubeSats developed and used by the Taiwan Space Agency.

== Naming ==
The family is named after the Chestnut-bellied tit (Sittiparus castaneoventris) which is endemic to Taiwan.

== PARUS-T1 ==
PARUS-T1A was launched in 2024 but failed to achieve orbit due to rocket failure. PARUS-T1 achieved orbit following a January 2025 launch as part of SpaceX's Transporter-12 mission. PARUS-T1 orbits at 515-kilometers, within low Earth orbit. It is a 3U class cubesat and carries experimental telecommunications and Automatic identification system payloads.

== PARUS-T2 ==
PARUS-T2 was launched to orbit in June 2025. It has a primary communications payload. It has a domestic Automatic Packet Reporting System (APRS) and a domestic altitude determination and control system (ADCS). The ADCS is made by Tensor Tech. PARUS-T2 has a planned mission life of 12 months and orbits at 621 kilometers.

== PARUS-6U1 ==
PARUS-6U1 is scheduled for launch in October 2025 as part of SpaceX's Transporter-15 mission.

== See also ==
- COSMIC-2
- Formosat-8
- ONGLAISAT
