= Tensor Tech =

Tensor Tech is a Taiwanese space technology company.

== History ==
Tensor Tech founder Thomas Yen claims that the initial motor design was inspired by a futuristic car tire he saw in the movie I, Robot. As a teenager Yen was able to get access to the electrical engineering lab at National Cheng Kung University which does much work with the Taiwan Space Agency. At the lab Yen and a friend were introduced to Spacecraft attitude determination and control and the associated single-axis motors. From there Yen began thinking about how the single axis motors could be improved. His movie inspiration led him to design a multi-axis motor. Yen attended National Taiwan University studying electrical engineering program before dropping out to found Tensor Tech in 2019. Yen was not the first to conceive of multi-axis motors, the first literature on them appeared more than 20 years earlier, however Tensor Tech was the first to commercialize a design. Multi-axis motors are lighter than single axis ones which allows customers to save money because launch weight is a prime cost component for satellites. The startup company received funding from angel investors including Pua Khein-Seng.

In 2022 Tensor Tech launched a test payload as part of the Polish SatRevolution's Stork-1 project. The satellite was launched into orbit on SpaceX's Transporter-3 mission.

The PARUS-T2, launched in 2025, uses a Tensor Tech attitude determination and control system.

In 2025 the company claimed that its client base included companies in "Europe, the United States, Japan, South Korea and India" with new satellites flying quarterly. Tensor Tech broke even for the first time in 2025.

== Awards and recognition ==
In 2025 Tensor Tech's three-axis spherical motor for space applications won an award at the SelectUSA Investment Summit.

== See also ==
- Taiwan Aerospace Industry Association
