= Tiny Ionospheric Photometer =

Device for measuring the Earth's ionosphere

The tiny ionospheric photometer (TIP) is a small space-based photometer that observes the Earth's ionosphere at 135.6 nm. The TIP instruments were designed and built by the US Naval Research Laboratory (NRL) and are a part of the COSMIC program.

== Operation ==
Although each TIP instrument is fairly simple in design and operation, the value of this instrument is that six of them were launched at once, and they observe the Earth simultaneously from three orbital planes spaced equally apart around the Earth. The data of this instrument when combined with the data from the other COSMIC payloads allows a 3D tomographic analysis of the Earth's ionosphere to be performed.

== See also ==
- Constellation Observing System for Meteorology, Ionosphere, and Climate (COSMIC)
