= Gamma-ray Transients Monitor =

First astronomical CubeSat funded by Taiwan Space Agency

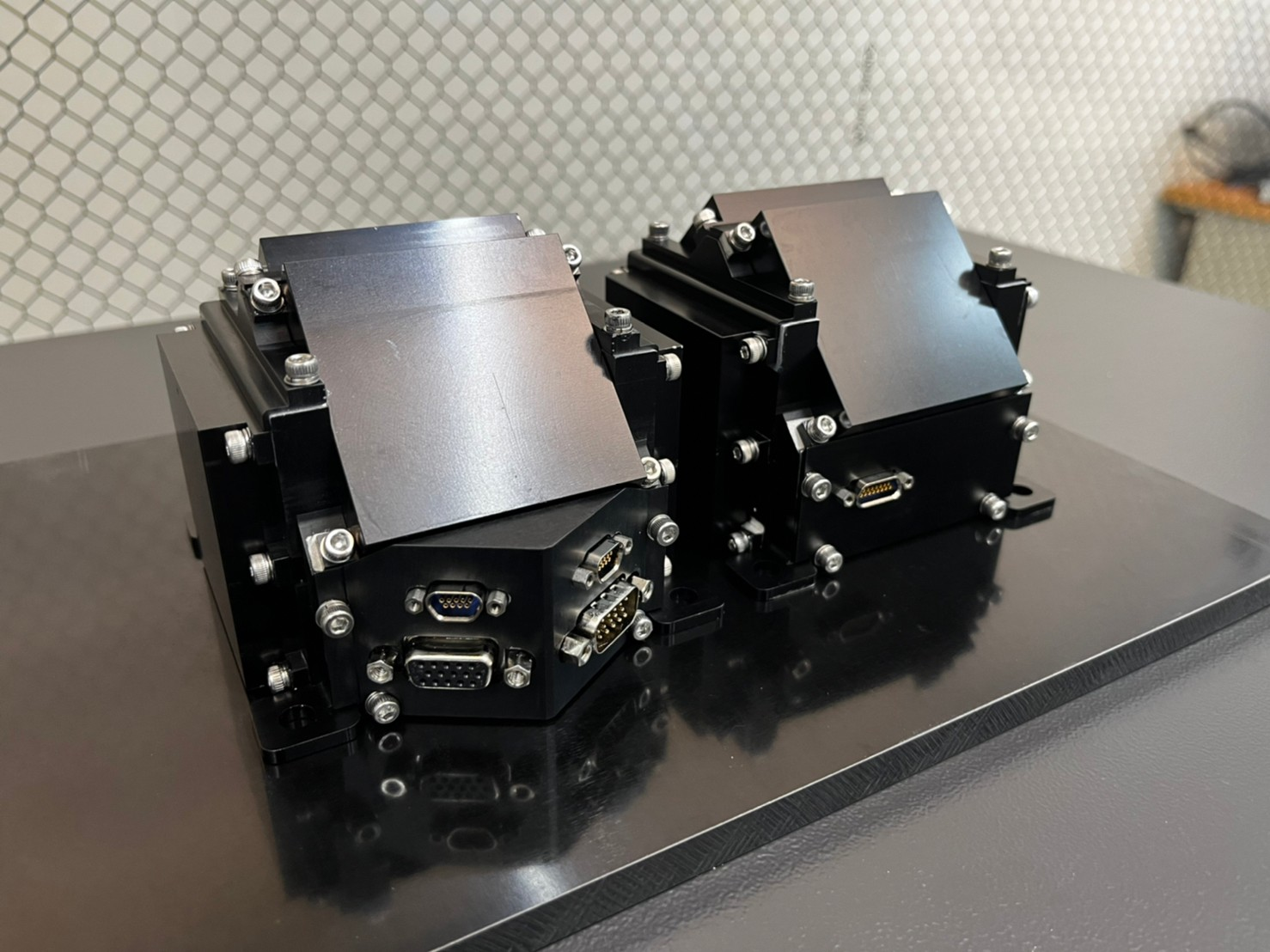
- GTM master and slave modules after assembly process.
- Mission type: Gamma-ray astronomy
- Operator: TASA
- Website: https://crab0.astr.nthu.edu.tw/#

Spacecraft properties
- Bus: Formosat-8B
- Manufacturer: TASA
- Payload mass: 1.9 kg
- Power: 2 Watts

Orbital parameters
- Altitude: 561 km
- Inclination: 97 deg.

Main telescope
- Name: Gamma-ray Transients Monitor
- Type: GAGG Semiconductor
- Collecting area: all-sky
- Wavelengths: 50 keV to 2 MeV
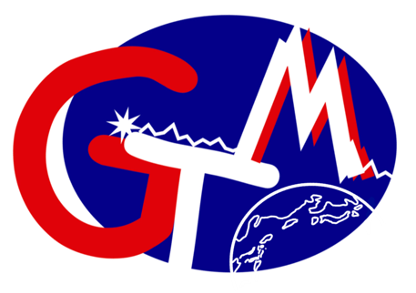
- GTM logo

The Gamma-ray Transients Monitor (GTM) is the first space astronomical telescope of Taiwan. It is a secondary payload on board Formosat-8B (FS-8B), which is a remote-sensing satellite developed by TASA.

The goal of GTM is to track Gamma Ray Bursts (GRBs) and other bright gamma-ray transients with energies ranging from 50 keV to 2 MeV. GTM is made up of two identical modules on opposite sides of the FS-8B. Each module has four sensor units facing different directions, covering half of the sky. The two modules will then cover the entire sky, including the direction obscured by the Earth. The sensor units consist of a Gadolinium Aluminum Gallium Garnet (GAGG) (a semiconductor) scintillator array (50 mm x 50 mm x 8 mm) that is readout by SiPM with 16 pixel channels. GTM is expected to detect approximately 50 GRBs per year. It is expected to launch in 2026.

It is a collaboration between National Tsing Hua University, Academia Sinica and Taiwan Space Agency (TASA). The PI of the project is Prof. Hsiang-Kuang Chang from NTHU. The repository that stores the code for Science Data Center (SDC) of Gamma-ray Transients Monitor is on GitHub.

== Science ==
GRBs are the universe's most energetic explosions. However, there is significant overlap in the duration comparison of SGRBs and LGRBs, complicating a clear distinction between the two types of GRBs. Actually, many other classification methods, such as hardness ratio, time and lag, encounter overlapping issues. To advance our understanding of GRB classification based on their true progenitor mechanisms, more GRB monitors, such as GTM, can increase the number of GRB databases, which is very useful.

Using the above relationships, GRBs can be viewed as a type of standard candle for measuring distances that supernovae of type Ia cannot probe. The large redshifts make it possible to use these correlations to constrain cosmological parameters. As a result, more GRB monitors, such as GTM, can provide greater sky coverage and location capability, allowing for the discovery of more GRB afterglows, host galaxies, and redshifts, all of which are highly desirable.
