= Formosat-8 =

Taiwanese earth observation satellites

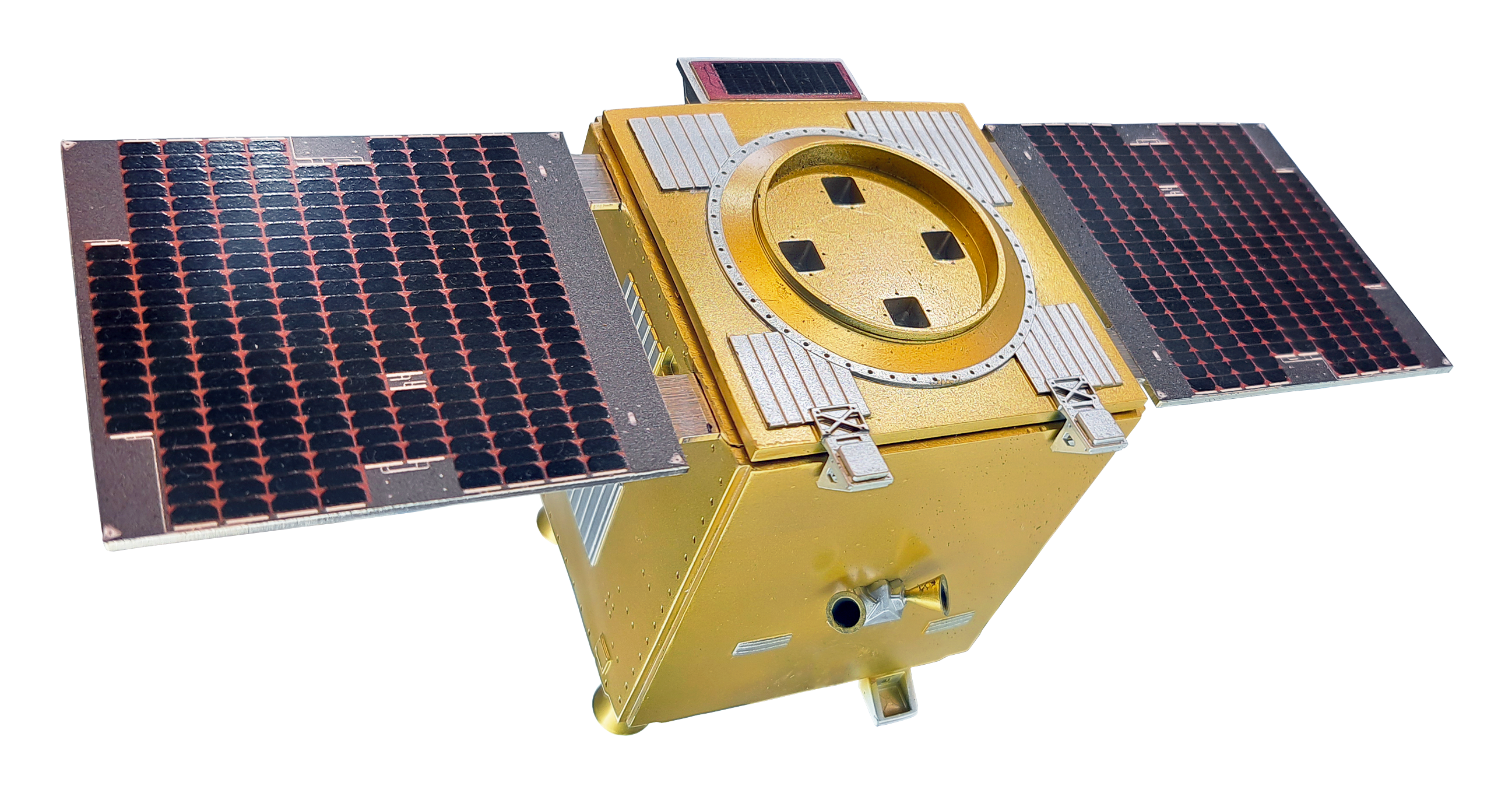
- Country of origin: Taiwan
- Operator: Taiwan Space Agency

Production
- Planned: 8
- Launched: 1
- Operational: 1
- Maiden launch: 28 November 2025

Formosat-8 is a constellation of Taiwanese earth observation satellites under development by Taiwan Space Agency.

== History ==
The program builds off of Formosat-5, a remote imaging satellite which was launched in 2017. In 2024 it was announced that the domestic parts would make up 80% of the satellites. The Formosat-8 program was praised by Taiwanese President Lai Ching-te during a May 2025 visit to the program office.

The first launch was initially planned for October, 2025 via SpaceX. In early October the first satellite was flown to the United States with a new expected launch date in November. The launch was delayed by the 2025 United States federal government shutdown to 28 November 2025.

== Payloads ==
Six of eight satellites are planned to fly high resolution optical payloads with less than 1m resolution and two satellites are planned to fly with 1m resolution payloads.

== Team ==
As of 2025 Cynthia Liu was the project manager.

== Satellites ==
Launches began in 2025 and are expected to end in 2031. FORMOSAT-8C and 8D will be launched by Avio's Vega C rockets from the Guiana Space Centre.

=== Formosat-8A ===
The first satellite in the constellation is Formosat-8A (FS-8A). It was launched on 28 November 2025 on the Falcon 9 mission Transporter-15 from Vandenberg Space Force Base. The satellite is named after Chi Po-lin in honor of the Taiwanese photographer and filmmaker who died in a tragic helicopter accident in 2017.

=== Formosat-8B ===
FS-8B is expected to be launched in December 2026.

== Gallery ==
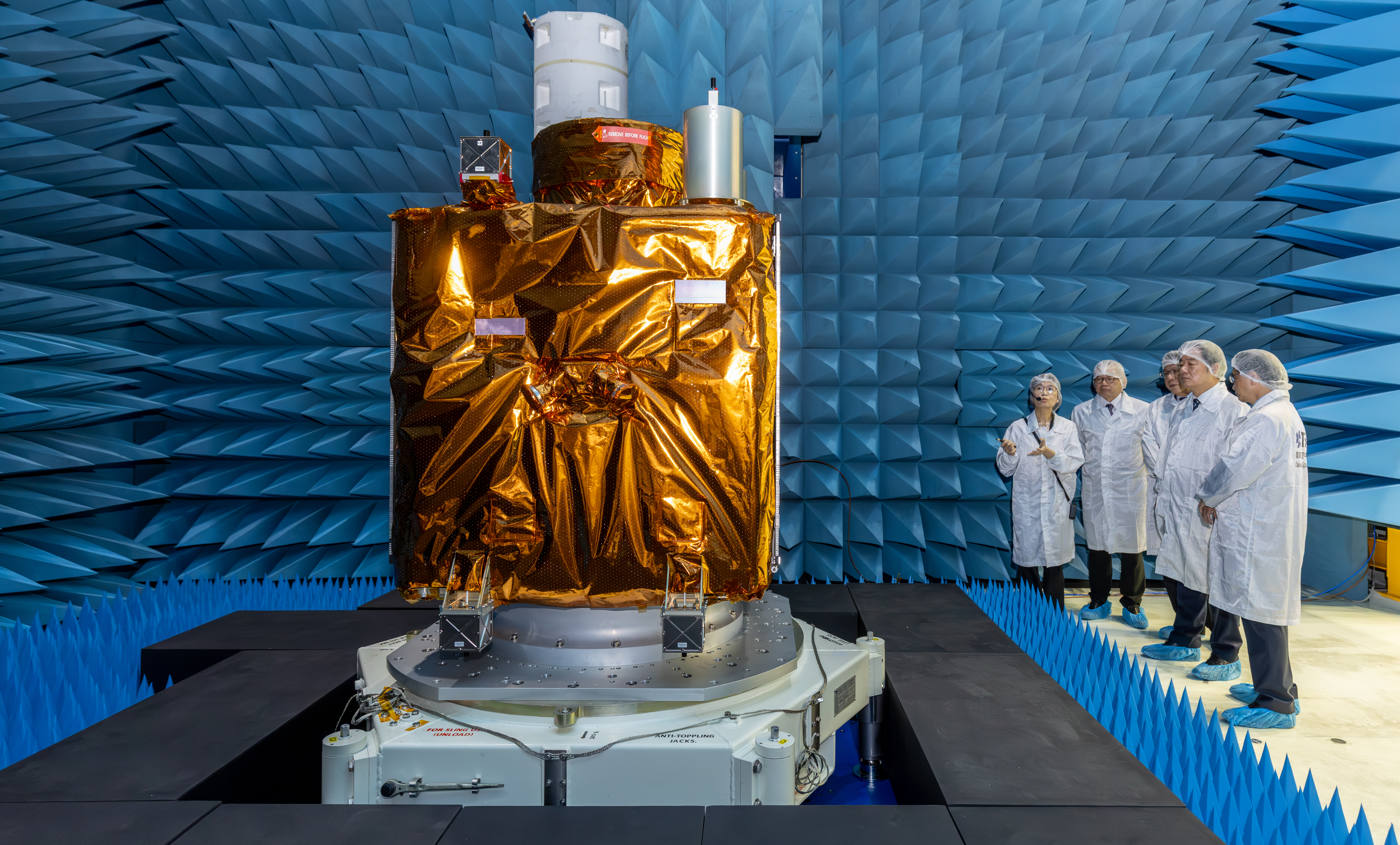

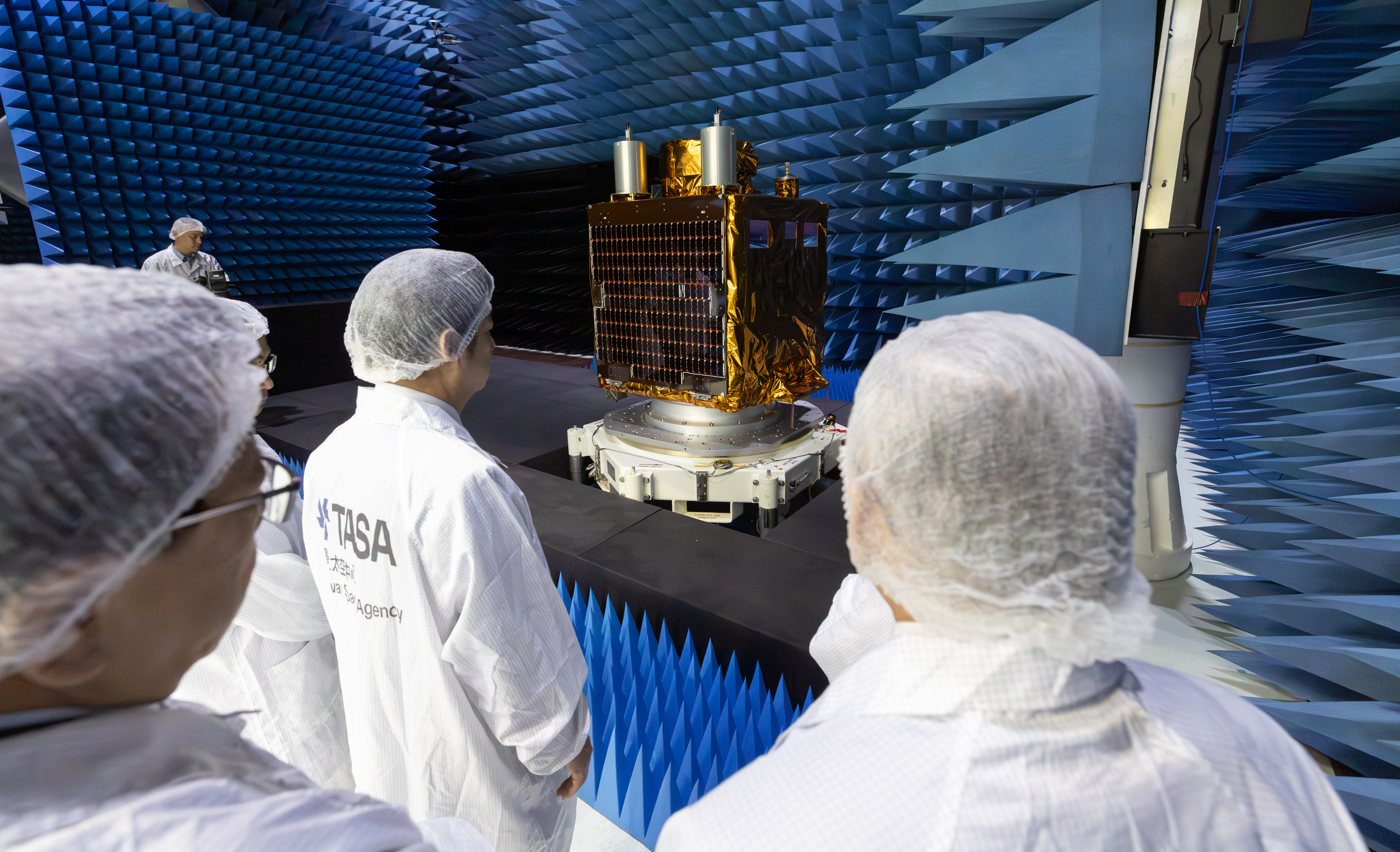

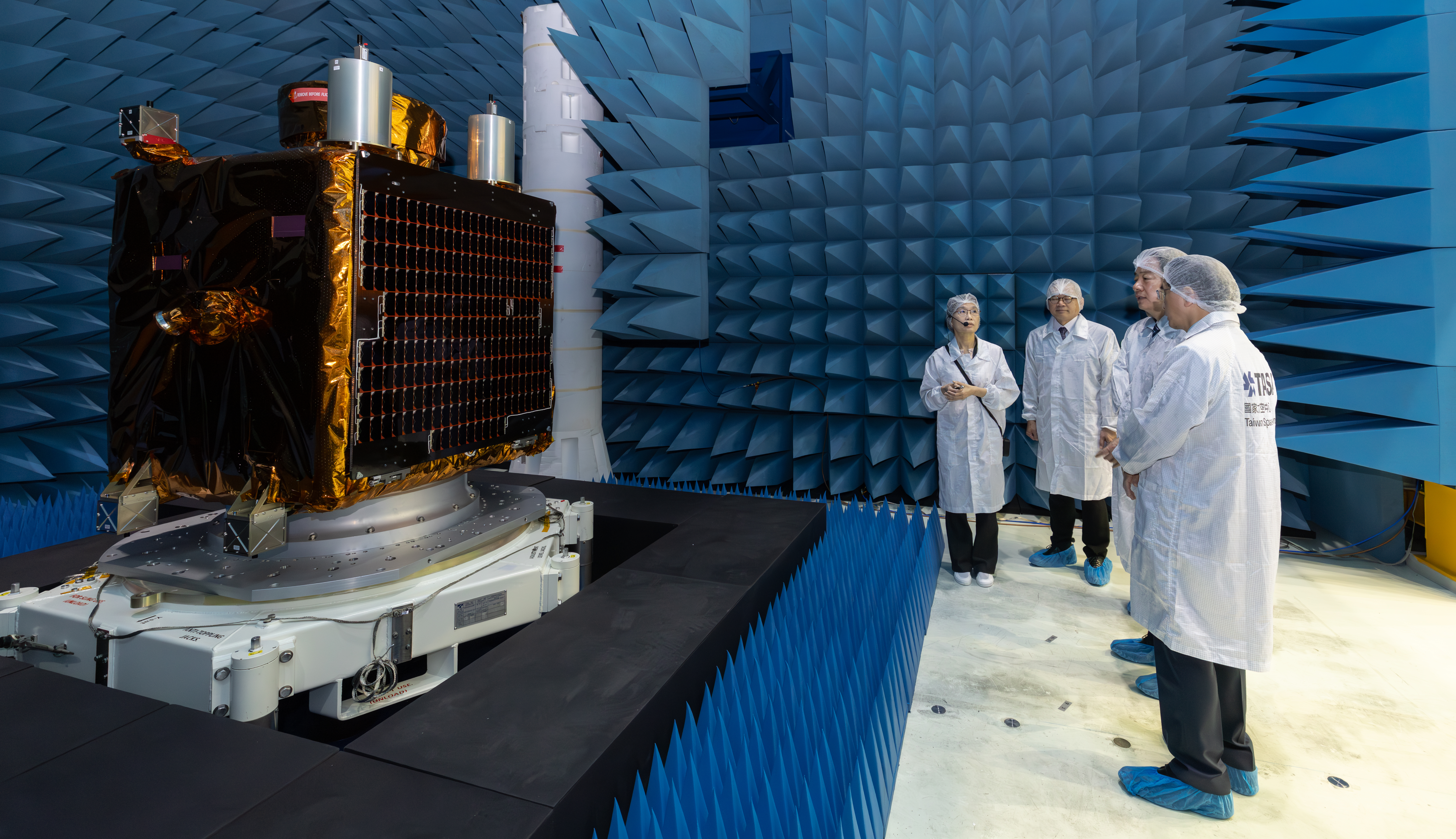

== See also ==
- COSMIC-2
- Formosat-2
- PARUS (Taiwanese satellite family)
- ONGLAISAT
