= Formosat-5 =

Taiwanese Earth observation satellite

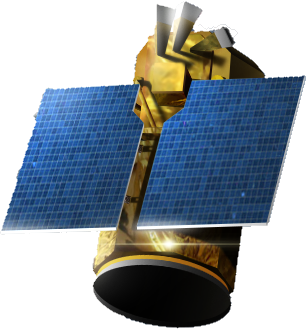
- Artist's concept of Formosat-5
- Mission type: Earth observation
- Operator: NSPO
- COSPAR ID: 2017-049A
- SATCAT no.: 42920
- Website: Formosat-5
- Mission duration: Planned: 5 years Elapsed: 9 years, 1 month, 21 days

Spacecraft properties
- Manufacturer: NSPO
- Launch mass: 475 kg (1,047 lb)
- Dimensions: 1.6 × 2.8 m (5.2 × 9.2 ft)

Start of mission
- Launch date: 24 August 2017, 18:51 UTC
- Rocket: Falcon 9 FT
- Launch site: Vandenberg SLC-4E
- Contractor: SpaceX

Orbital parameters
- Reference system: Geocentric
- Regime: Sun-synchronous
- Semi-major axis: 7,101.4 km (4,412.6 mi)
- Eccentricity: 0.0009348
- Perigee altitude: 716.6 km (445.3 mi)
- Apogee altitude: 729.9 km (453.5 mi)
- Inclination: 98.2892°
- Period: 99.25 minutes
- Epoch: 25 August 2017, 12:30:14 UTC

Formosat-5 (Formosa Satellite 5; Chinese: 福爾摩沙衛星五號) is the first Earth observation satellite manufactured and operated solely by the National Space Organization, the national civilian space agency of Taiwan. The satellite was launched from a Falcon 9 rocket on 24 August 2017, and placed into a Sun-synchronous orbit at an altitude of about 720 km. Formosat-5 can capture color and more detailed monochrome images, along with measuring the ionosphere plasma's properties.

== Spacecraft design ==
Formosat-5's primary goal is to demonstrate Taiwan's satellite manufacturing capabilities and produce data for various academic research. The satellite is 2.8 m tall, 1.6 m wide with an octagonal prism body, and weighs about 450 kg. Formosat-5 contains the Optical Telemetry Payload (Chinese: 光學遙測酬載) capturing color and monochrome images, and the Advanced Ionospheric Sounder (Chinese: 先進電離層探測儀) measuring the ionosphere.

The Optical Telemetry Payload is the primary instrument aboard the spacecraft, composed of a telescope and an electrical unit. The telescope uses a CMOS chip designed to see four light wavelengths: blue, green, red, and near infrared. The chip also has a dedicated monochrome sensor with 12-bit color depth. The Optical Telemetry Payload has a 10GB storage device, which can store panoramas that take 8 minutes to capture. Formosat-5 can capture images with a 2-meter resolution in black and white and 4 meters in color.

Formosat-5 also contains a scientific payload, called Advanced Ionospheric Probe, that studies plasma physics and properties in the ionosphere. This instrument can measure plasma composition, density, temperature, and flow rate. The Advanced Ionospheric Probe is expected to be sensitive enough to capture anomalies of the ionosphere before earthquakes.

Other components of Formosat-5 include a power control and distribution unit, heaters, batteries, and foldable solar panels. The power control and distribution unit can output a voltage of 5.2V with a maximum wattage of 50W. Formosat-5's MIPS computer can process 20 million instructions per second, with high-speed data channels.

== Operation ==
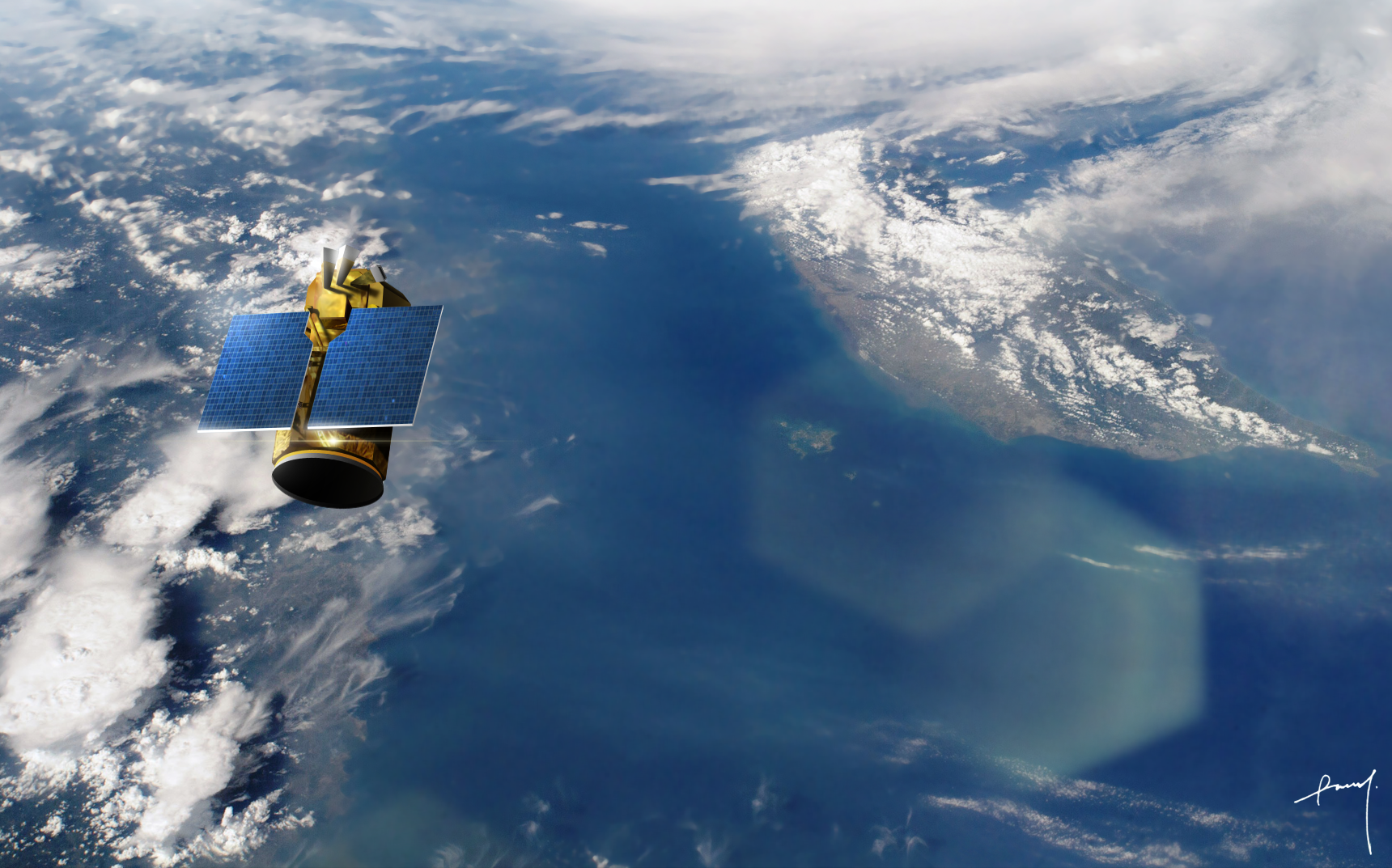
Artist's concept of Formosat-5 in orbit

Formosat-5 is the National Space Organization's first indigenously developed observation satellite, directed by Chang Ho-pen (張和本).

The satellite was flown from Taiwan to Los Angeles International Airport in the United States on 19 July 2017 via a China Airlines transport aircraft, and arrived at Vandenberg Air Force Base on 26 July. Launch took place on 24 August 2017 at 18:51 UTC from Vandenberg Space Launch Complex 4 aboard a Falcon 9 rocket.

In September 2017, Formosat-5 transmitted its first images, which were blurry. A subsequent rescue mission fixed the satellite; however, it is limited to capturing images during good weather.

== See also ==
- Formosat-8
