= The TaiWan Ionospheric Model =

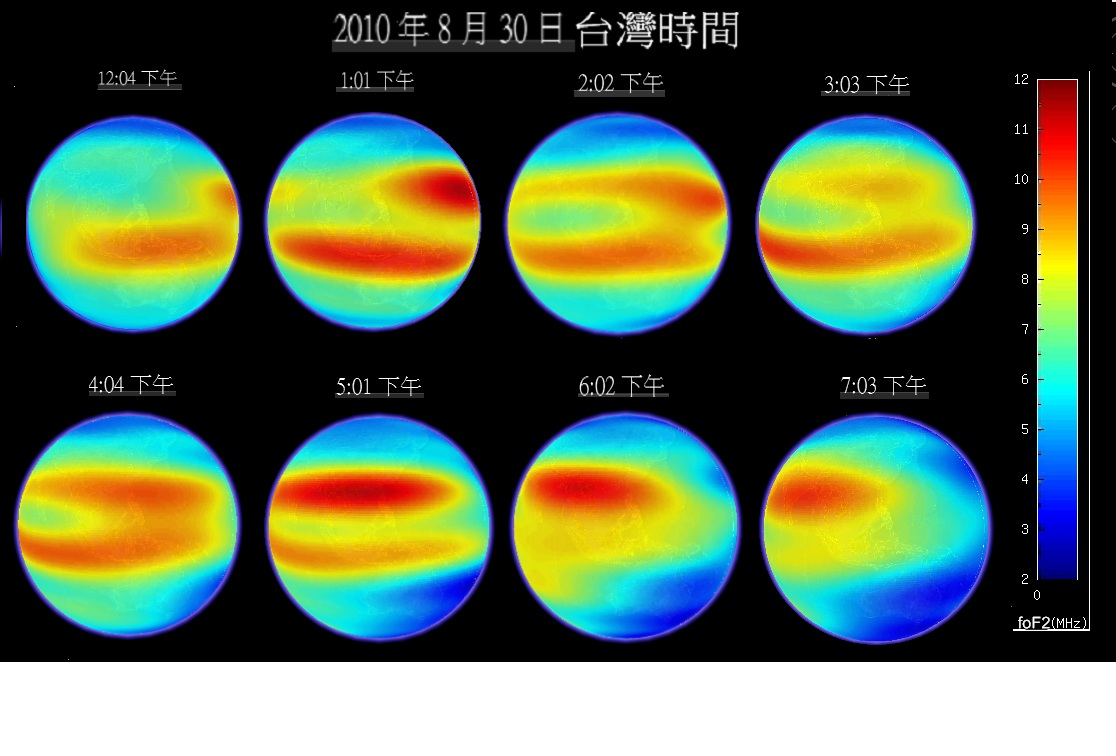
TWIM can provide global ionospheric electron density with time

The TaiWan Ionospheric Model (TWIM) developed in 2008 is a three-dimensional numerical and phenomenological model of ionospheric electron density (Ne). The TWIM has been constructed from global distributed ionosonde foF2 and foE data and vertical Ne profiles retrieved from FormoSat3/COSMIC GPS radio occultation measurements. The TWIM consists of vertically fitted α-Chapman-type layers, with distinct F2, F1, E, and D layers, for which the layer parameters such as peak density, peak density height, and scale height are represented by surface spherical harmonics. These results are useful for providing reliable radio propagation predictions and in investigation of near-Earth space and large-scale Ne distribution with diurnal and seasonal variations, along with geographic features such as the equatorial anomaly. This way the continuity of Ne and its derivatives is also maintained for practical schemes for providing reliable radio propagation predictions.
