= Constellation Observing System for Meteorology, Ionosphere, and Climate =

Joint US-Taiwan meteorological satellite constellation

COSMIC
- COSMIC
- Names: FORMOSAT-3
- Mission type: Meteorology, Ionosphere, Climatology, and Space weather research
- COSPAR ID: 2006-011A, 2006-011B, 2006-011C, 2006-011D, 2006-011E, 2006-011F,
- SATCAT no.: 29047, 29048, 29049, 29050, 29051, 29052
- Website: www.nspo.narl.org.tw
- Mission duration: Final: 14 years, 15 days

Spacecraft properties
- Manufacturer: Orbital Sciences Corporation
- Launch mass: 6 × 155 lb (70 kg)

Start of mission
- Launch date: 15 April 2006, 01:40 UTC
- Rocket: Minotaur I Flight 5
- Launch site: Vandenberg SLC-8
- Contractor: Orbital Sciences

End of mission
- Disposal: decommissioned
- Deactivated: 1 May 2020

Orbital parameters
- Reference system: Geocentric
- Eccentricity: 0
- Perigee altitude: 500 km (310 mi)
- Apogee altitude: 500 km (310 mi)
- Inclination: 72°

Constellation Observing System for Meteorology, Ionosphere, and Climate (COSMIC) is a program designed to provide advances in meteorology, ionospheric research, climatology, and space weather by using GPS satellites in conjunction with low Earth orbiting (LEO) satellites. The term "COSMIC" may refer to either the organization itself or the constellation of 6 satellites (also known as COSMIC-1 and as FORMOSAT-3, 福爾摩沙衛星三號, in Taiwan). The constellation is a joint U.S.-Taiwanese project with major participants including the University Corporation for Atmospheric Research (UCAR), the National Science Foundation, the Naval Research Laboratory (NRL), the Air Force Research Laboratory (AFRL), SRI International on the U.S. side and the National Space Organization (NSPO) on the Taiwanese side.

The total cost of the spacecraft and launch was US$100 million, 80% of which was provided by NSPO, and the remainder by various U.S. agencies.

After experiencing several delays, the launch of the COSMIC satellite constellation atop a Minotaur launch vehicle from Vandenberg AFB occurred at 01:40 GMT, on 15 April 2006, despite heavy fog. The satellites, which orbit at an altitude of 500 miles, required over a year to move into the correct positions to provide full global coverage.

A follow-up constellation, COSMIC-2, launched 25 June 2019 on a Falcon Heavy rocket.

== Instruments ==
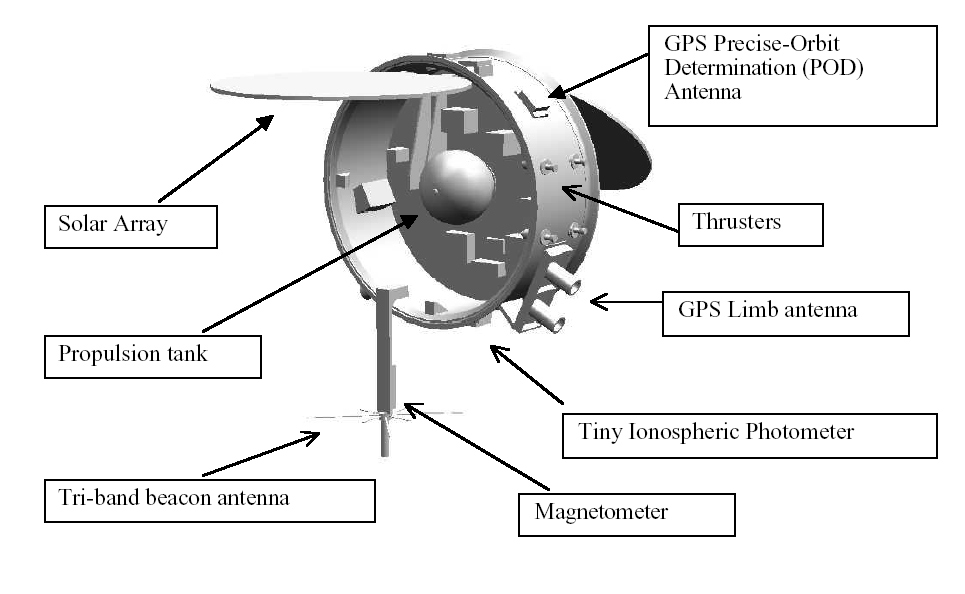
Components of a FORMOSAT-3 satellite

The COSMIC satellites are equipped with three primary forms of instrumentation for remote sensing, including:

- GPS Radio Occultation Experiment
- Tri-band beacon (TBB), in VHF, UHF and L-band
- Tiny Ionospheric Photometer (TIP)

== Deployment ==
All 6 microsatellites were launched on a single launch vehicle and deployed into a single parking orbit after launch. The spacecraft were then deployed into separate orbital planes through the use of precession due to the oblateness of the Earth and raised to a final orbital altitude over the course of several months. Scientific data were collected during the deployment process, along with experimental validation and calibration.

== Status ==
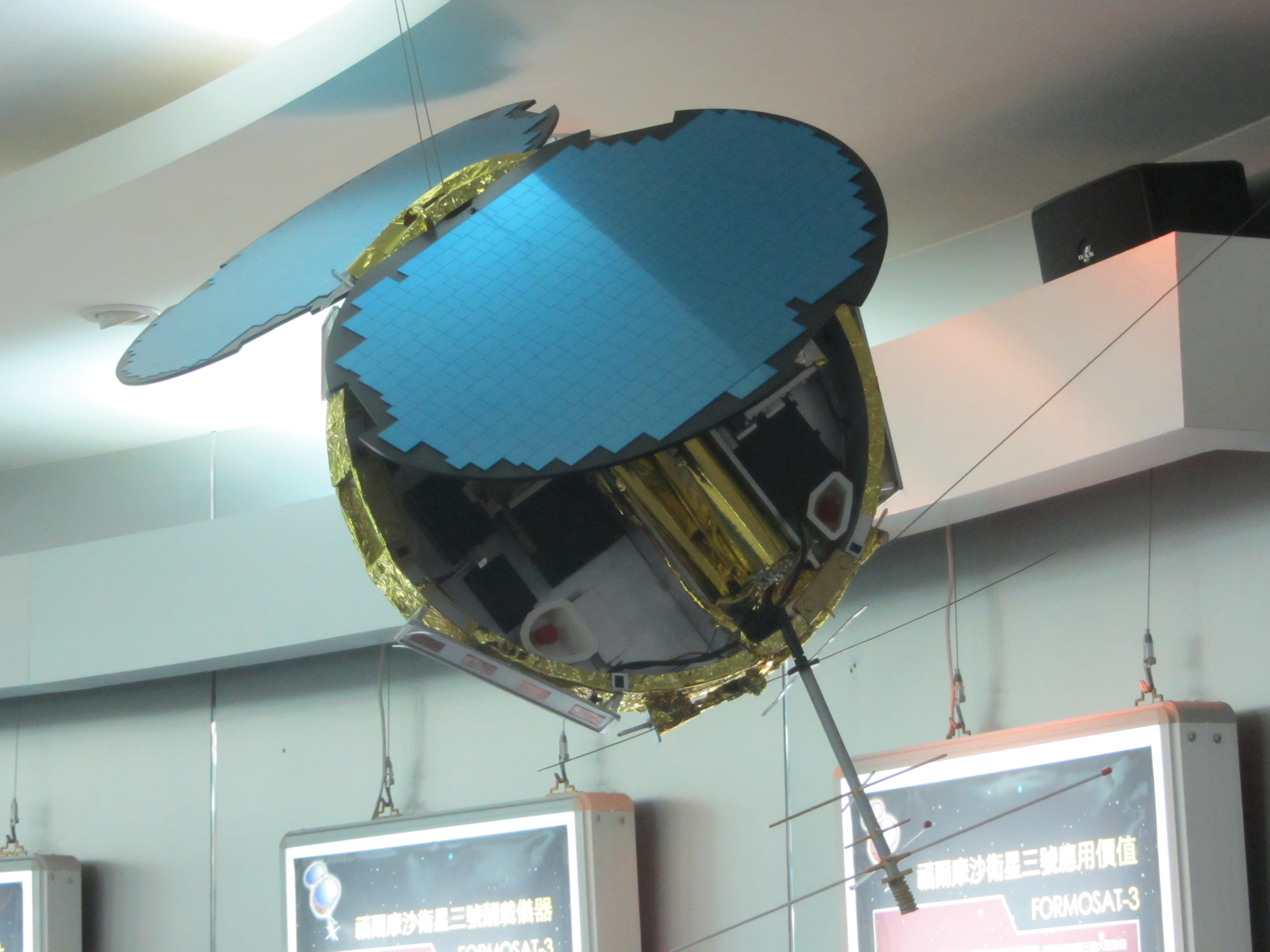
Model of FORMOSAT-3

FM2's power system lost 50% of its output in February 2007, while FM3's solar panel had also malfunctioned since August 2007. As a result, both satellites operated in a degraded state, capable of returning data only during specific solar angles. FM6 went out of control in September 2007, but control was restored by November 16 of the same year. FM3 experienced severe power problems on 6 July 2010, and was declared non-functional at that time. FM4, FM5, and FM6 suffered from battery aging problem.

The data published by the COSMIC-1 constellation has been used in weather models to improve the quality of weather forecasts. On 1 May 2020, the satellite constellation was retired.

== Orbital information ==
=== Parking orbit ===
- Altitude: 500 km
- Inclination: 72 degrees
- Eccentricity: 0

=== Final orbital configuration ===
- Altitude: 700 – 800 km
- Inclination: 72 degrees
- Eccentricity: 0
- Spacing between right ascension of ascending node: 24 degrees
- Spacing in mean anomaly between adjacent orbital planes: 45 degrees

== See also ==
- CHAMP
- FORMOSAT-7/COSMIC-2, replacement mission launched in 2019
- Gravity Recovery and Climate Experiment (GRACE)
- MetOp, a European weather satellite that also carries a GPS radio occultation receiver
- National Space Organization
- The TaiWan Ionospheric Model
- 2006 in spaceflight
