= COSMIC-2 =

Joint U.S.-Taiwanese research satellite constellation

COSMIC-2/FORMOSAT-7
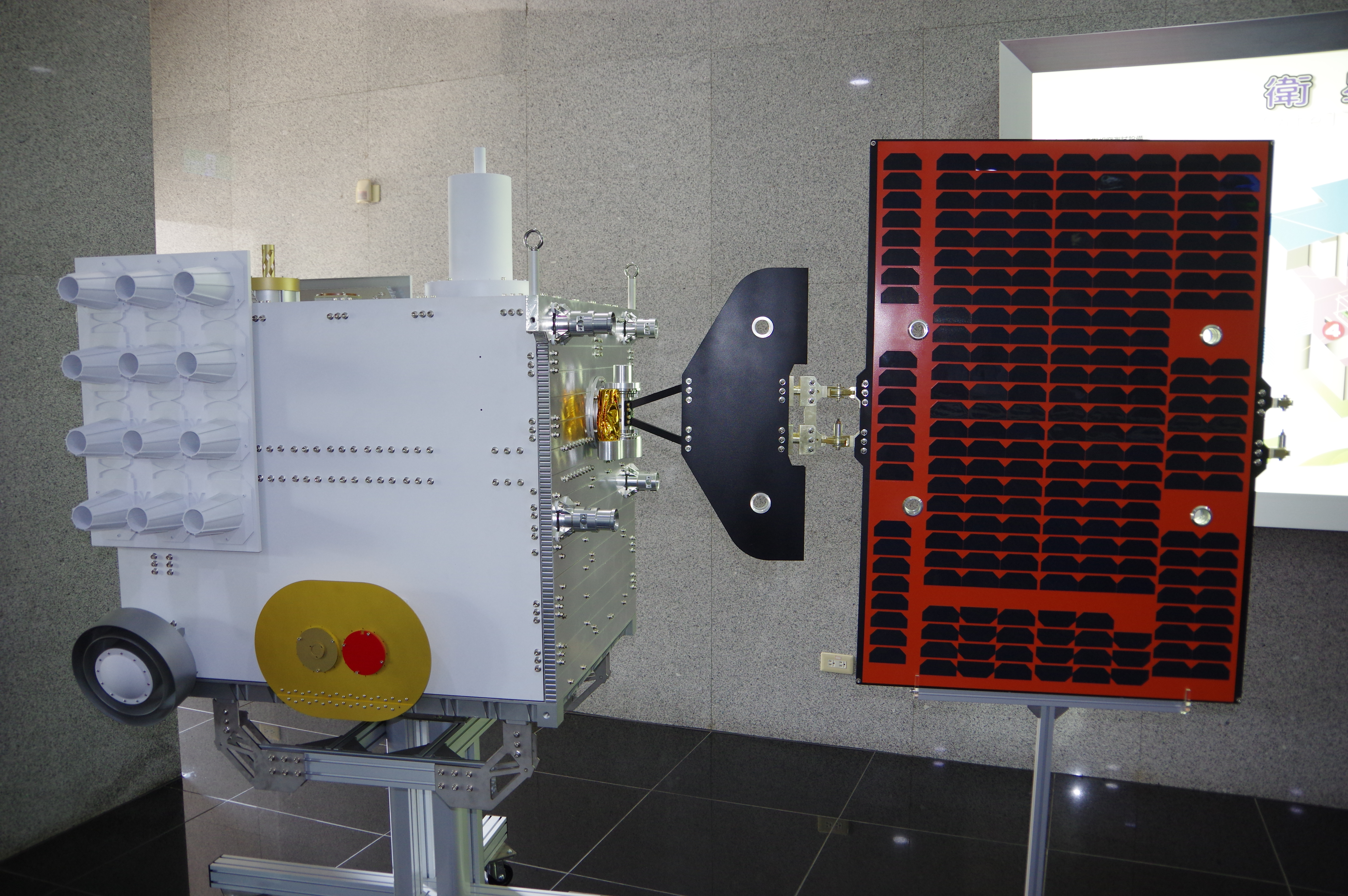
- model of COSMIC-2/FORMOSAT-7
- Mission type: Meteorology, ionosphere, climatology, and space weather research
- Operator: Taiwan Space Agency (formerly National Space Organization); NOAA
- COSPAR ID: 2019-036L, 2019-036N, 2019-036E, 2019-036M, 2019-036V, 2019-036Q
- SATCAT no.: 44349, 44351, 44343, 44350, 44358, 44353
- Website: www.tasa.org.tw
- Mission duration: Planned: 5 years Elapsed: 7 years, 4 months, 14 days

Spacecraft properties
- Manufacturer: National Space Organization and SSTL
- Launch mass: 6 × 300 kg (660 lb)
- Dimensions: Length: 1.25 m, width: 1 m, height: 1.25 m

Start of mission
- Launch date: 25 June 2019, 06:30 UTC
- Rocket: Falcon Heavy Flight 3
- Launch site: KSC LC-39A

Orbital parameters
- Reference system: Geocentric orbit
- Inclination: 24°(Set 1); 72°(Set 2, canceled)
- Period: 97 min
Instruments
- TGRS: Tri-GNSS Radio occultation System
- IVM: Ion Velocity Meter
- RFB: Radio Frequency Beacon
National Space Organization

COSMIC-2 also known as FORMOSAT-7, is the constellation of satellites for meteorology, ionosphere, climatology, and space weather research. FORMOSAT-7 is a joint US-Taiwanese project including National Space Organization (NSPO) on the Taiwanese side and the National Oceanic and Atmospheric Administration (NOAA) and the United States Air Force (USAF) on the US side. FORMOSAT-7 is the successor of FORMOSAT-3 The six satellites of the constellation were launched 25 June 2019 on a Falcon Heavy rocket. They reached their designated mission orbits in February 2021, after 18 months of gradual orbital adjustments. Full operational capability was achieved in October 2021.

== Pre-launch ==
On the morning of 14 April 2019, President Tsai Ing-wen traveled to Hsinchu City to take part in send-off activities for the Formosat-7 satellite. She commended the hard work and accomplishments of the research and development team, and hailed Formosat-7 as a milestone in promoting Taiwan's technological diplomacy, noting that she expected the satellite would display "the brilliance of Taiwan's aerospace technology on the international stage".

On 15 April, the satellites were placed aboard a Taiwanese China Airlines cargo plane at Taoyuan International Airport. The six satellites were packed in three climate controlled transport crates. The satellites were shipped via diplomatic pouch to speed their journey through US customs, the first time a satellite had been shipped in this manner.

== Design ==
78% of components for the satellite program were made in Taiwan. The satellites receive signals from both GPS and GLONASS. The constellation collects more than 4,000 pieces of data a day.

=== Radio-Occultation Payload ===
The primary payload for the COSMIC-2 satellites is the Radio Occultation instrument.

This instrument is capable of measuring atmospheric effects by analyzing the propagation of GNSS signals through said atmosphere.

The instrument is composed of the Tri-band GNSS (TriG) RO and POD Receiver and four Antennas:

- Two Radio Occultation Arrays (the Cafeteria Cups Antenna) one Forward, one Aft
- Two Precise Orbit Determination Antennas, one Forward, one Aft

=== Cafeteria Cups Antenna ===
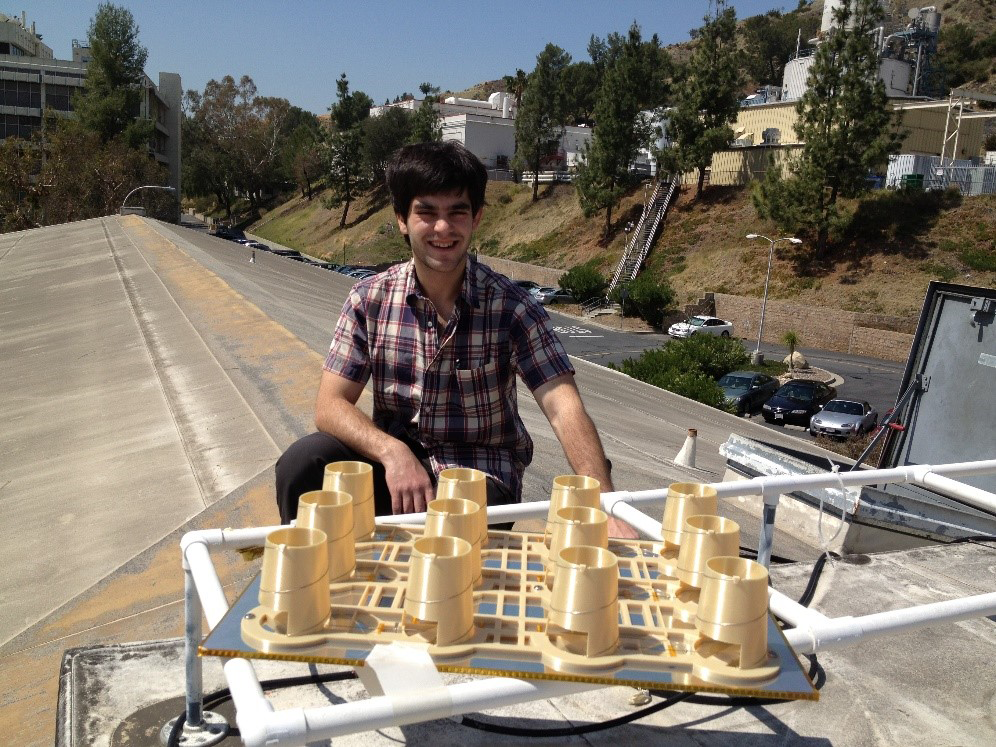
The COSMIC-2 RO antenna prototype "Cafeteria Cups", fabricated out of 3D-printed FDM Ultem 9085, and inventor Dmitry Turbiner.

Each RO Antenna is composed of three vertical sub-arrays, four elements each.

Each element is a two-turn helical spiral. The collected signals from the four vertical elements are combined with a low loss beamformer.

The name 'Cafeteria Cups' comes from the fact that the antenna elements in the very first prototype were made out of plastic cups from the JPL cafeteria.

The Antenna is fabricated out of FDM 3D printed Ultem 9085. This makes the COSMIC-2 RO antenna the first 3D printed part on the outside of a spacecraft to be qualified to NASA Class 2B spaceflight.

== Launch ==
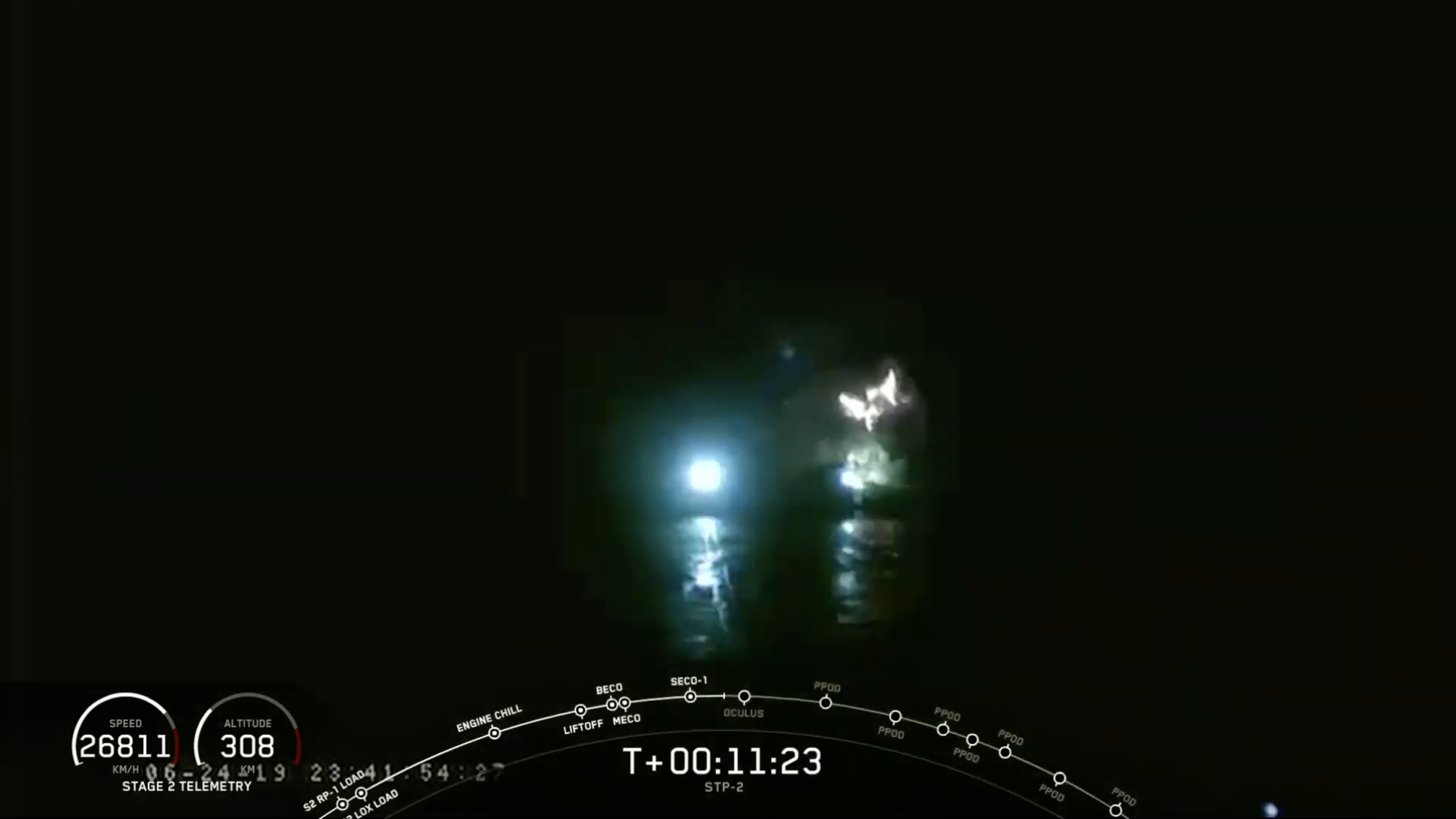
COSMIC-2 Launch

COSMIC-2 launched on SpaceX's Falcon Heavy from Kennedy Space Center Launch Complex 39A on 25 June 2019.

== Post-launch ==
The first data from COSMIC-2 was made public in March 2020 with the new data improving the accuracy of weather forecasts by 10-11%. All six satellites reached their mission orbits by February 2021. The mission achieved full operational capability in October 2021.

== See also ==
- National Space Organization
- 2019 in spaceflight
- FORMOSAT-3/COSMIC
- Formosat-8
- PARUS (Taiwanese satellite family)
