= Taiwan Aerospace Industry Association =

Non-profit organisation in Taiwan

- 台灣區航太工業同業公會
- Abbreviation: TAIA
- Formation: August 25, 1994; 31 years ago
- Type: Non-profit trade association
- Legal status: Representative body
- Purpose: Advocate for Taiwan's aerospace manufacturers
- Location: Taipei City, Taiwan
- Region served: Taiwan
- Services: Fostering domestic development, international cooperation, and industry-government engagement
- Official language: Chinese
- Website: www.taia.org.tw/enn/

The Taiwan Aerospace Industry Association (TAIA; Chinese: 臺灣區航太工業同業公會; pinyin: Táiwān qū hángtài gōngyè tóngyè gōnghùi) is a non-profit trade organisation established on August 25, 1994. It functions as the primary representative body for Taiwan's aerospace manufacturers, fostering domestic development, international cooperation, and industry-government engagement.

== History ==
The association was founded on August 25, 1994 in collaboration with the Taiwanese government.

Between 1992 and 1997, the number of certified aerospace manufacturers in Taiwan increased from 8 to 58, reflecting robust industrial growth. Investment by domestic aerospace firms reached approximately US $730 million by 1997, with total sales increasing from US$316 million in 1992 to US$1.13 billion in 1997. As of 2018, Taiwan's aerospace output value had surpassed NT$120 billion (about US$4 billion), with over 10,000 professionals employed.

By 2025, despite trade tensions since 2018, Taiwan’s aerospace industry remains focused on international expansion and supply‑chain integration. As Taiwan emphasises higher local content through defense-industry initiatives like “Domestic Aircraft Development", TAIA continues working to unify stakeholders across raw materials, manufacturing, logistics, and MRO services.

== Mission and Structure ==
TAIA was instituted to support member companies in navigating regulatory frameworks, improving manufacturing standards, and integrating into global aerospace supply chains. Its governing board consists of 21 directors, five supervisors, and committees overseeing international cooperation, smart manufacturing, industrial partnerships, human resources, and information gathering. As of 2019, Kai‑Hung Hu (Chairman of AIDC) and Wan‑June Ma (President of AIDC) serve respectively as TAIA’s Chairman and Executive director.

== Activities and Services ==
TAIA actively organises trade conferences, exhibitions, technical seminars, and industry forums such as the annual Taiwan Aerospace Industry and Policy Forum. It aids members in securing aerospace certifications, accessing government R&D funding, and leveraging export credit programmes. Additionally, the association provides a comprehensive member directory with promotional materials and relevant government agency information.

== International Collaboration ==
TAIA promotes international partnerships through MOUs and trade‑matching events. In 2019, it coordinated Taiwan–France industry collaboration via the GIFAS association, facilitating connections between French firms like Safran and Groupe Latécoère and over 15 Taiwanese aerospace companies. TAIA also supports Taiwanese participation in global ODA, cross‑border investment, and collaborative launch projects, including AIDC’s involvement with Boeing, Sikorsky, and GE.

== See also ==
- Aerospace industry in Taiwan
- Aerospace Industrial Development Corporation
