= Taiwan Space Agency =

National civilian space agency of Taiwan

- 國家太空中心 kok-ka thài-khong tiong-sim
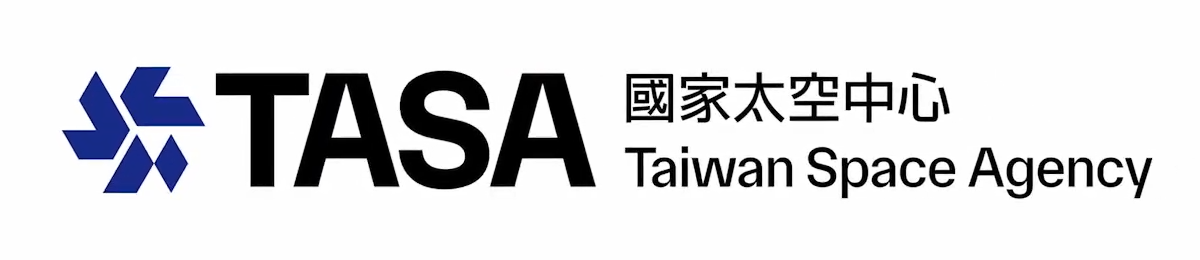
- Taiwan Space Agency Logo

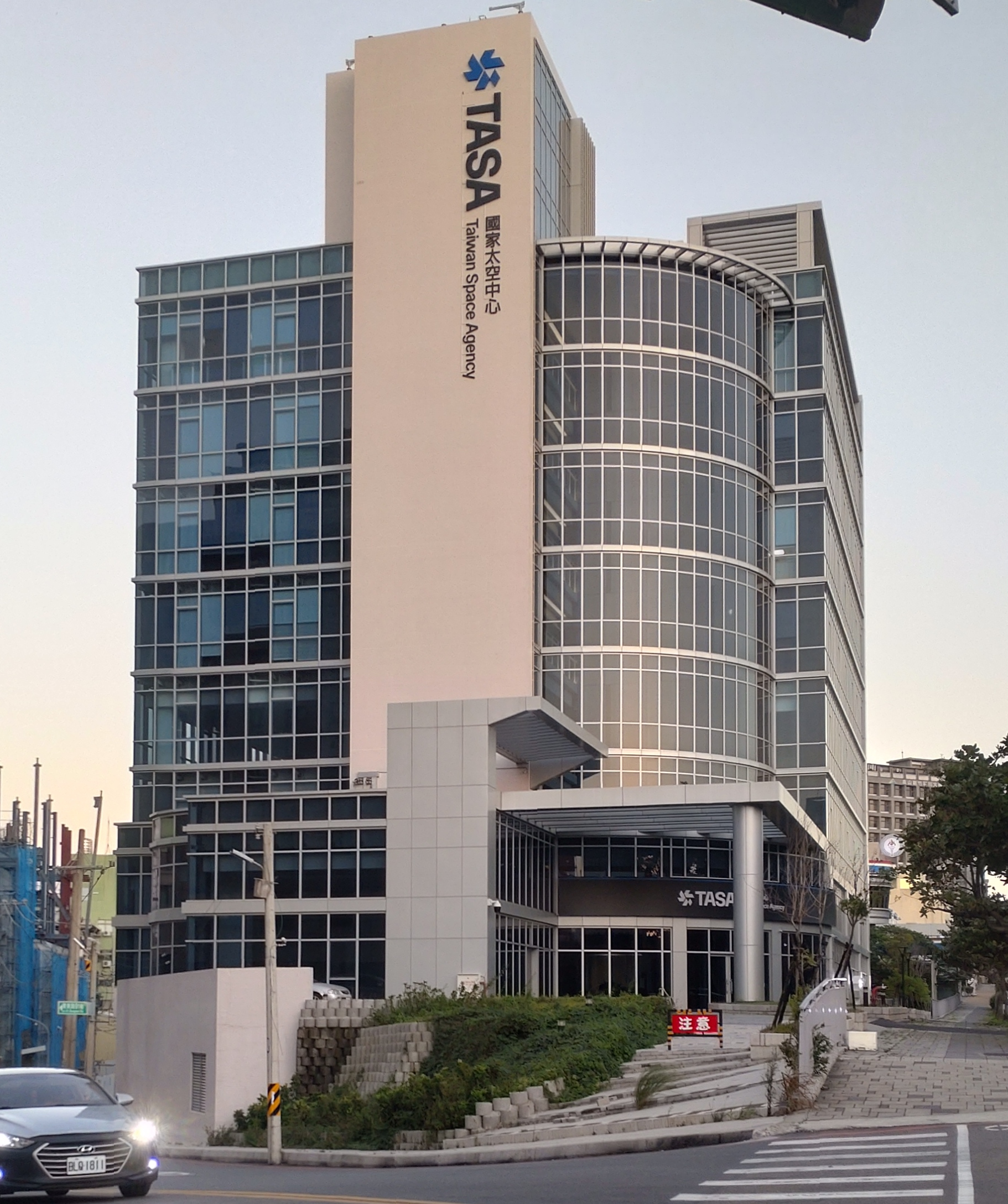
- Taiwan Space Agency office

Agency overview
- Abbreviation: TASA
- Former name: National Space Organization
- Formed: October 1991; 34 years ago (as National Space Program Office); 1 April 2005; 21 years ago (as National Space Organization)
- Type: Space agency
- Jurisdiction: Taiwan
- Headquarters: Hsinchu Science Park, Hsinchu
- Administrator: Wu Jong-shinn, Director General
- Primary spaceports: Jiu Peng Air Base, Pingtung County; Xuhai Rocket Launch Site, Pingtung County
- Employees: Roughly 300
- Annual budget: NT$10 billion dollars (2023)
- Website: www.tasa.org.tw

Taiwan Space Agency
- Traditional Chinese: 國家太空中心
- Simplified Chinese: 国家太空中心
- Literal meaning: National Space Centre
Transcriptions
Standard Mandarin
- Hanyu Pinyin: Guójiā Tàikōng Zhōngxīn
Southern Min
- Hokkien POJ: Kok-ka Thài-khong Tiong-sim

Taiwan Space Agency (abbreviated TASA), formerly the National Space Organization (NSPO) from 1991 to 2023, is the national civilian space agency of Taiwan, under the auspices of the National Science and Technology Council. TASA is involved in the development of space technologies and related research.

== Organization ==
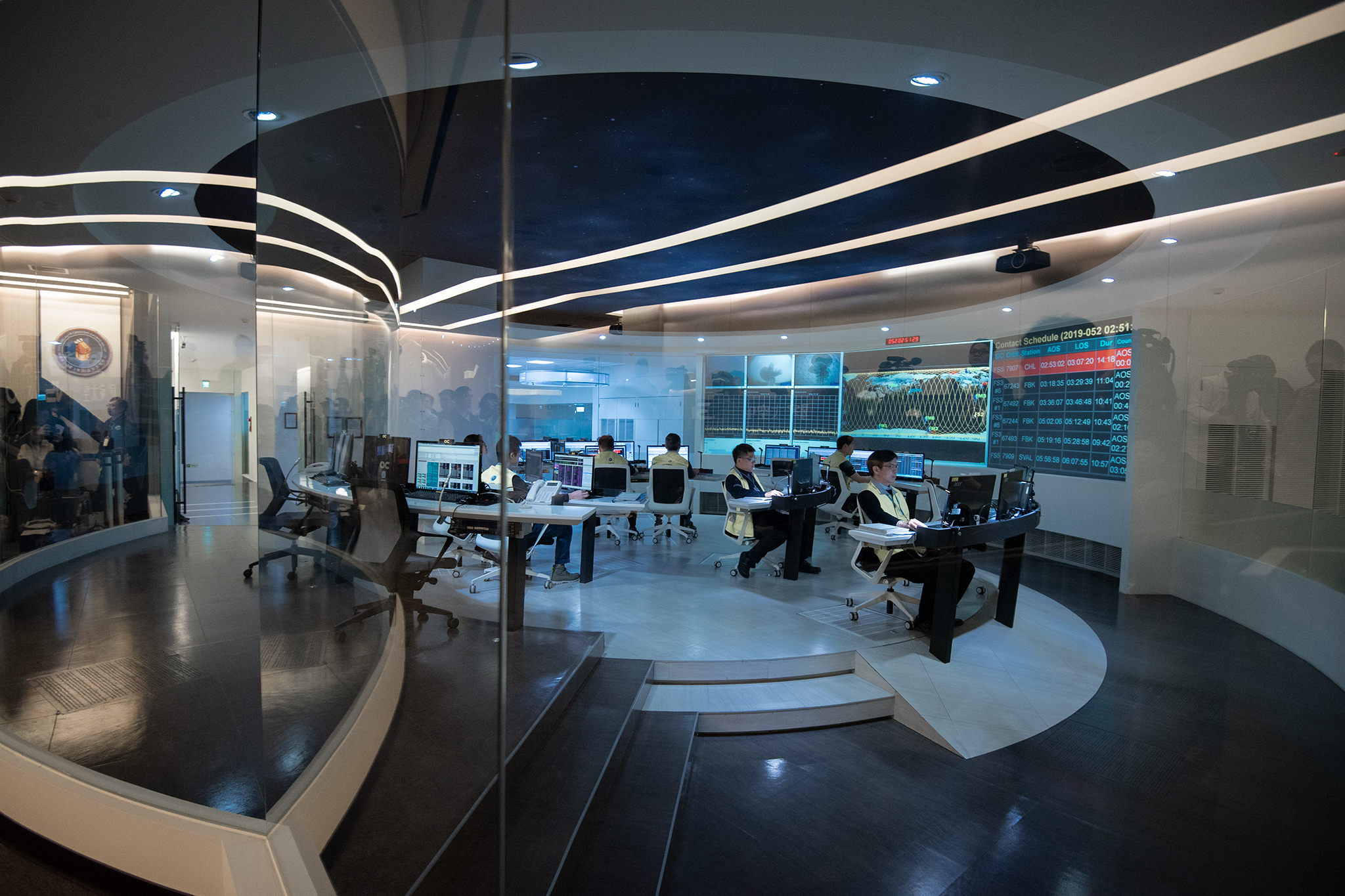
TASA ground control station in 2019

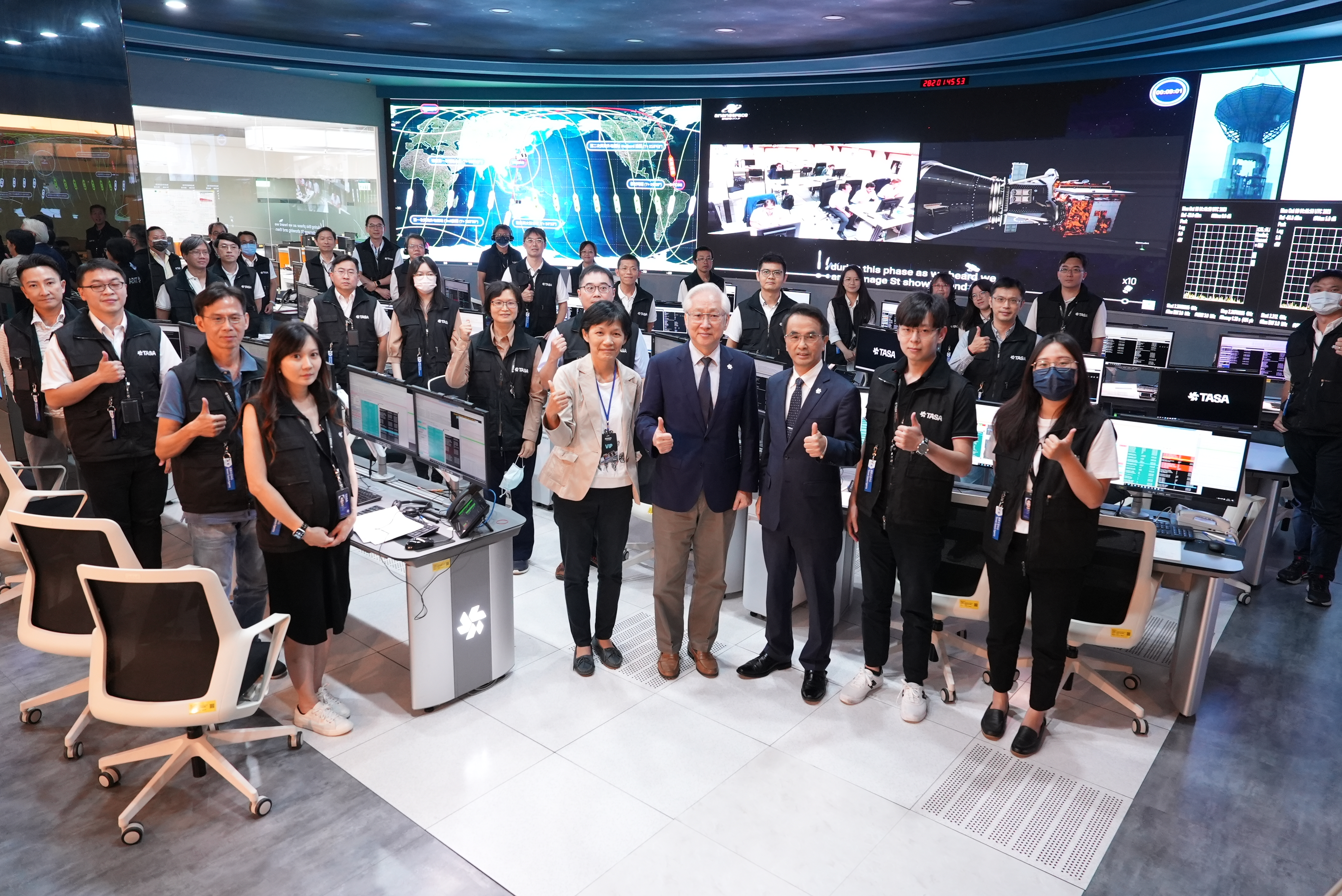
TASA ground control station in 2023

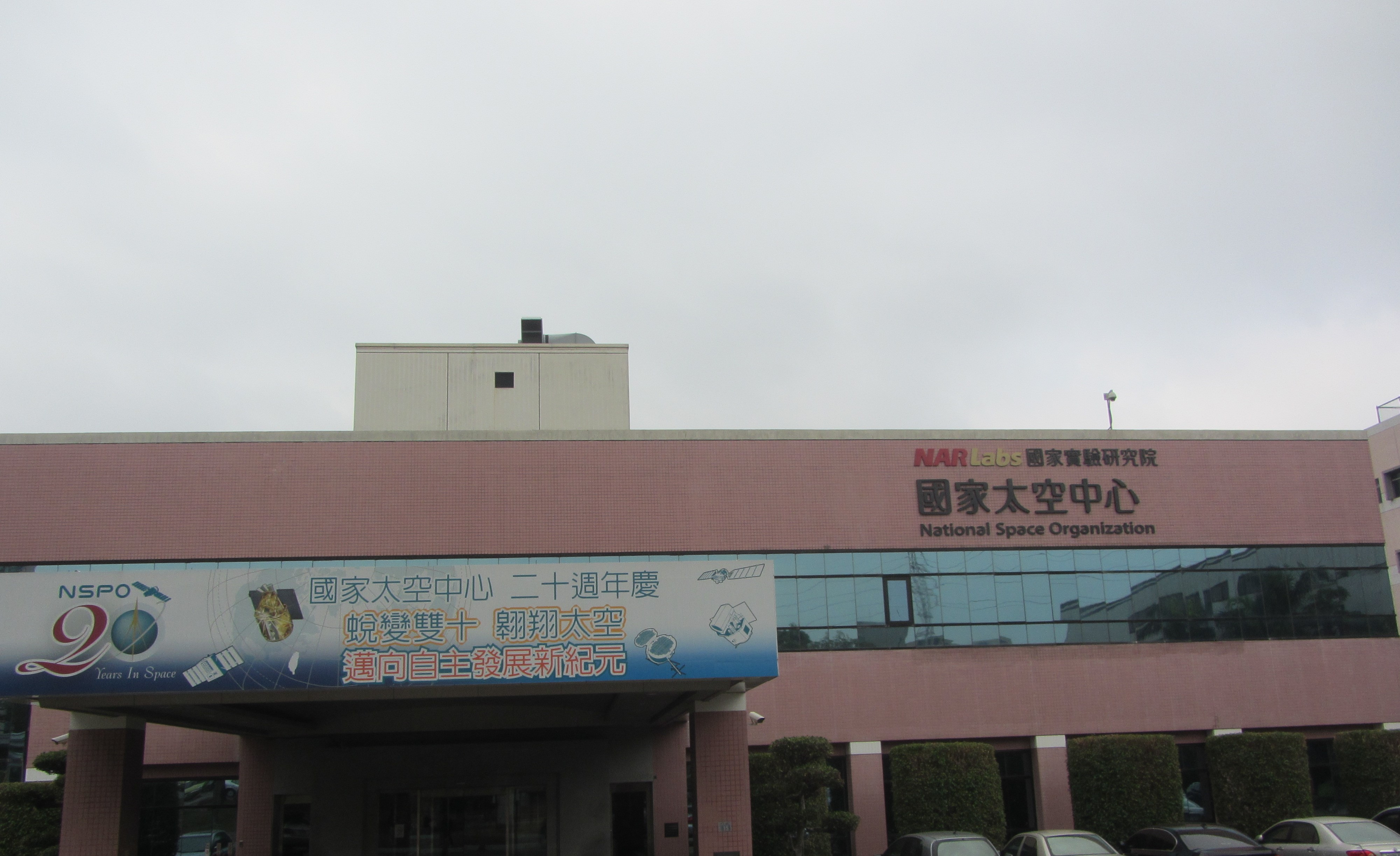
Satellite Integration and Test Building in 2013

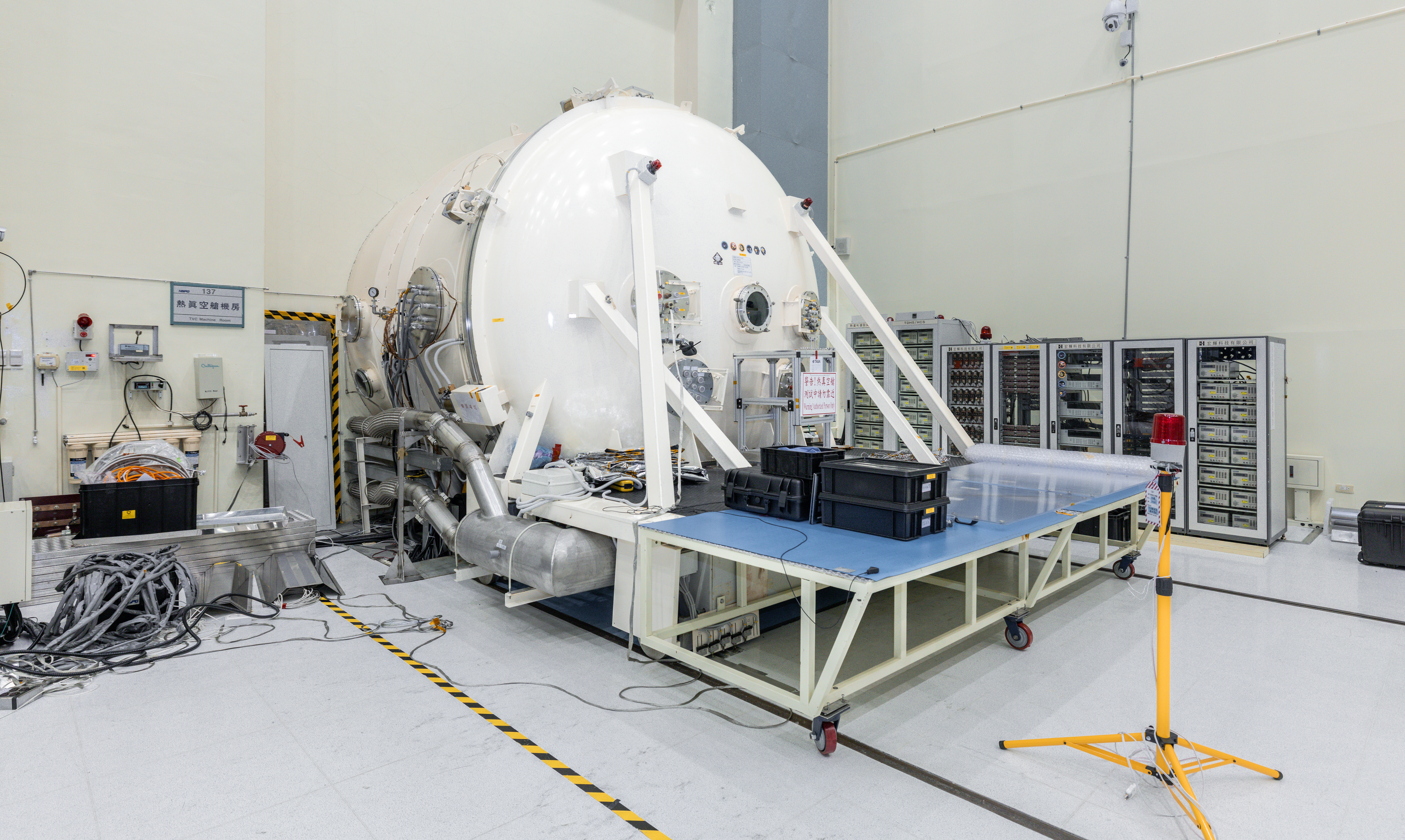
TASA research facility in 2025

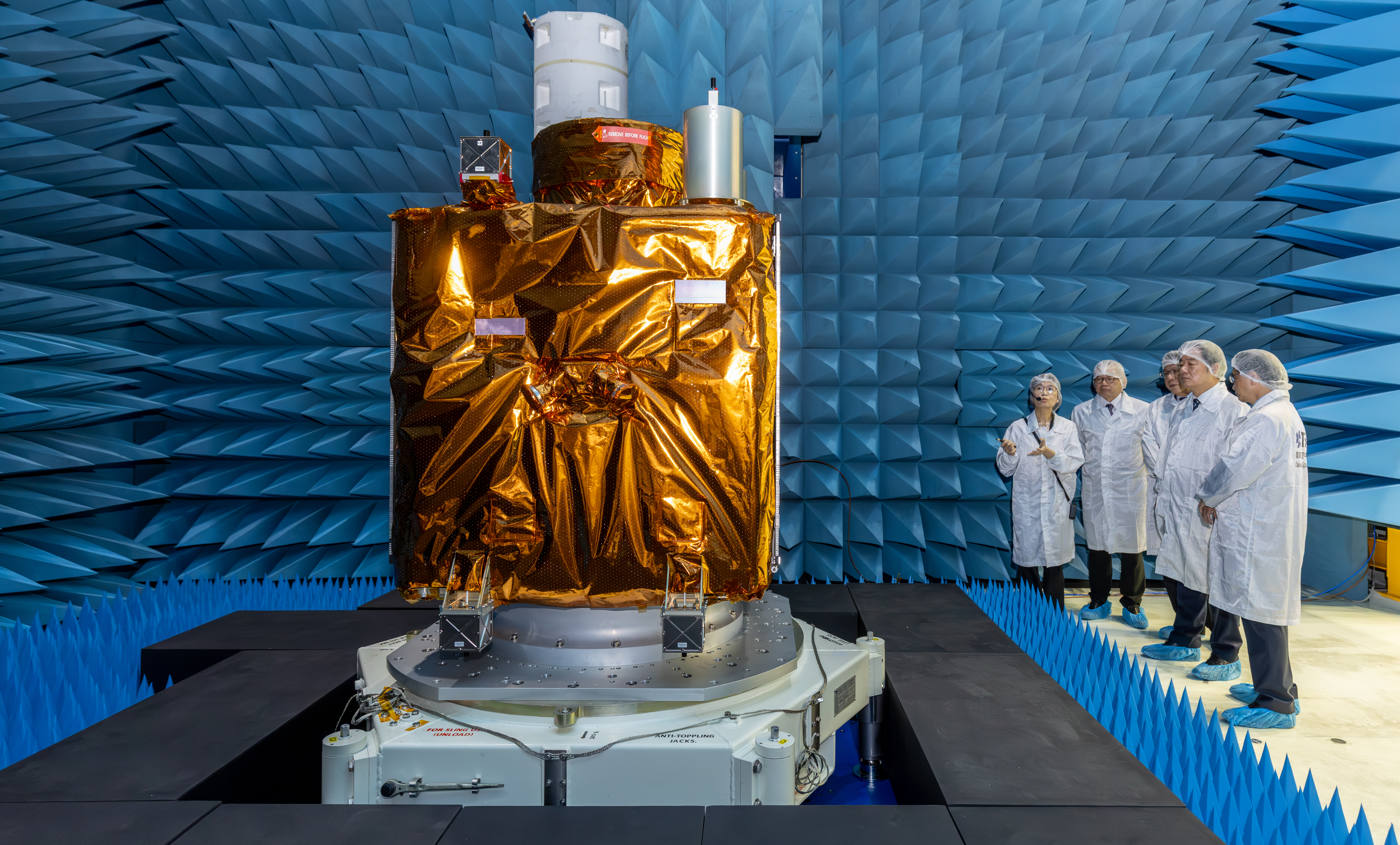
TASA anechoic chamber with Formosat-8

TASA headquarters and the main ground control station are in Hsinchu. In April 2022, the Legislative Yuan passed a bill that upgraded the NSPO to a directly affiliated agency of the National Science and Technology Council, and renamed Taiwan Space Agency. The TASA is organized as follows:

Director General's Office
Engineering division	Systems
Engineering division	Electrical
Engineering division	Mechanical
Engineering division	Flight control
Engineering division	Satellite operations control
Engineering division	Satellite image
Engineering division	Integration and test
Engineering division	Product assurance
Division	Planning and promotion
Division	Administration
Division	Finance and accounting
Program office	Mission oriented projects
Program office	Formosat 7
Program office	Formosat 5

TASA also has numerous laboratories, such as:

- System Simulation Laboratory
- Thermal Control Laboratory
- Microwave Communication Laboratory
- Data Processing Laboratory
- Attitude Determination and Control Laboratory
- Electro-optics Laboratory
- Structure Development Laboratory
- Electrical Power Laboratory
- Multi-layer Insulation (MLI) Laboratory

== History ==
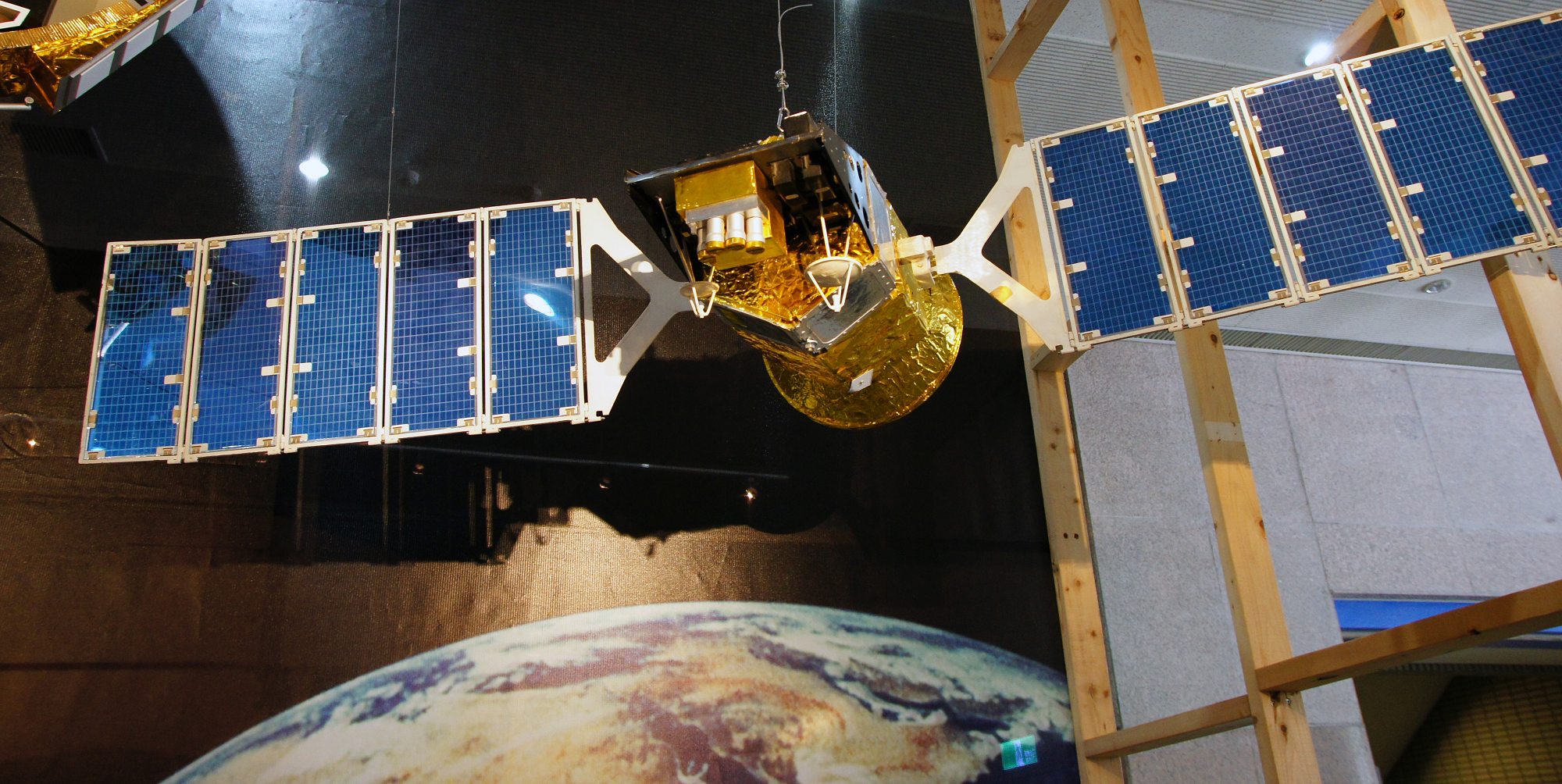
Model of Formosat-1

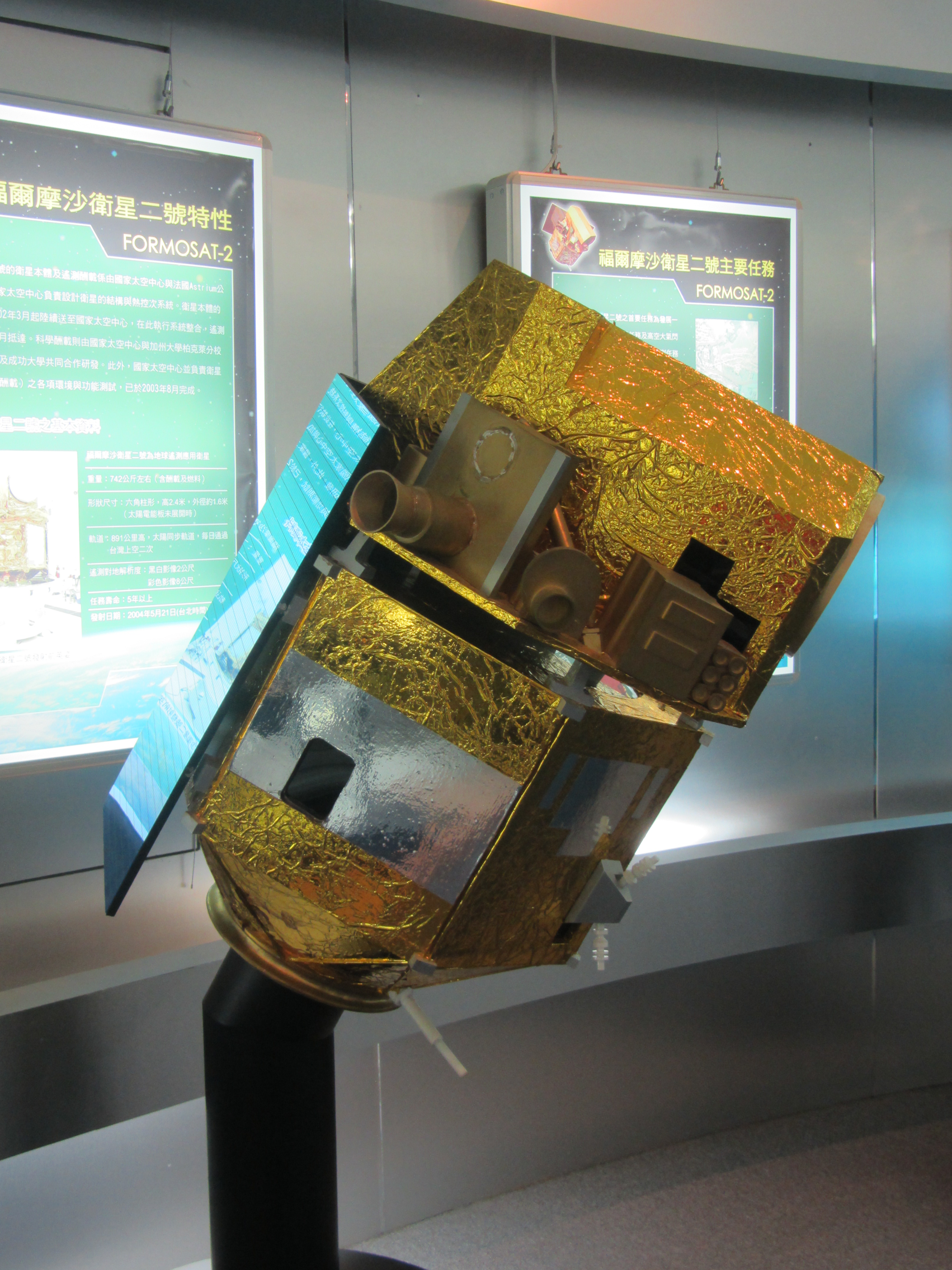
Model of FORMOSAT-2

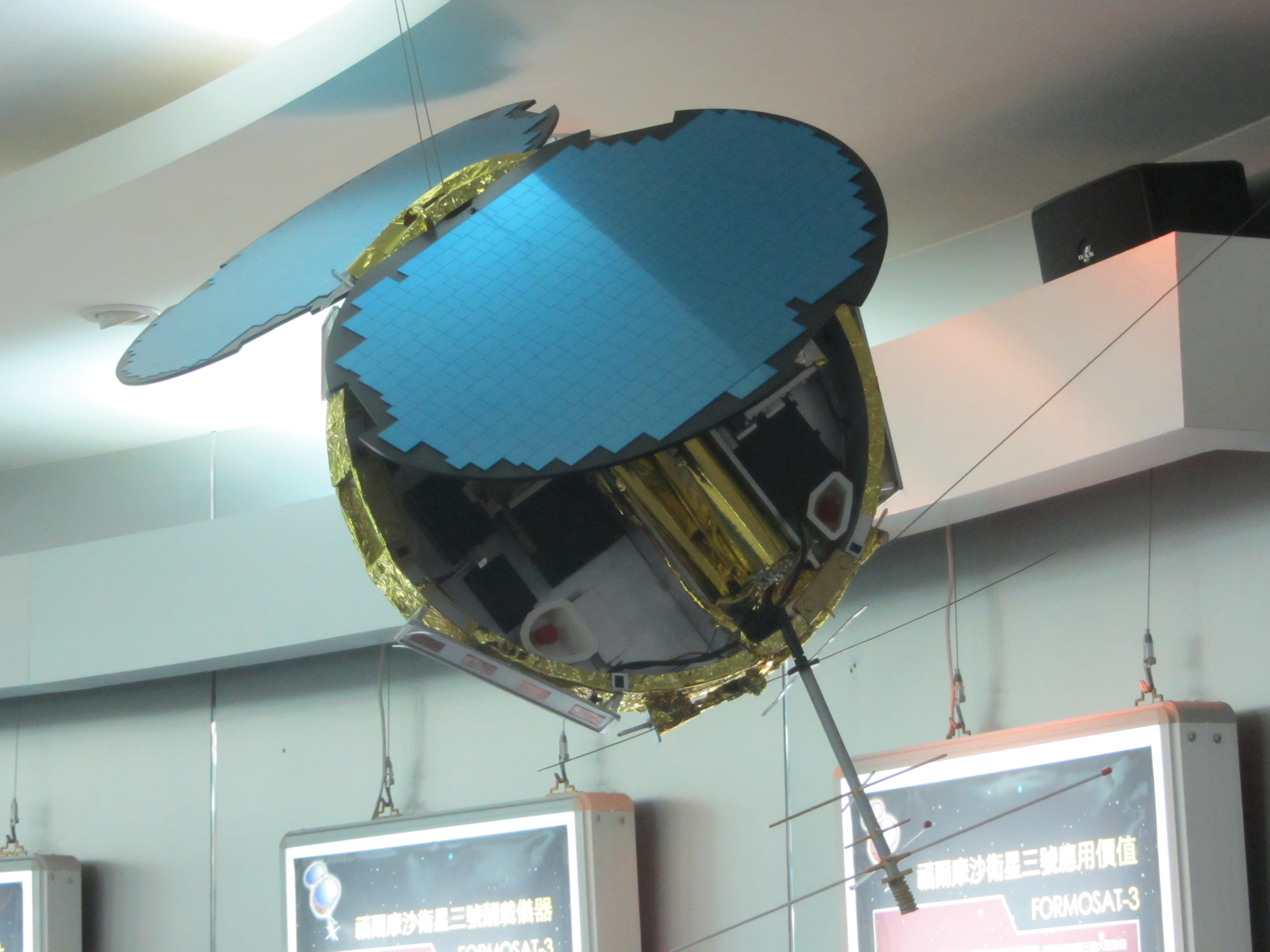
Model of FORMOSAT-3

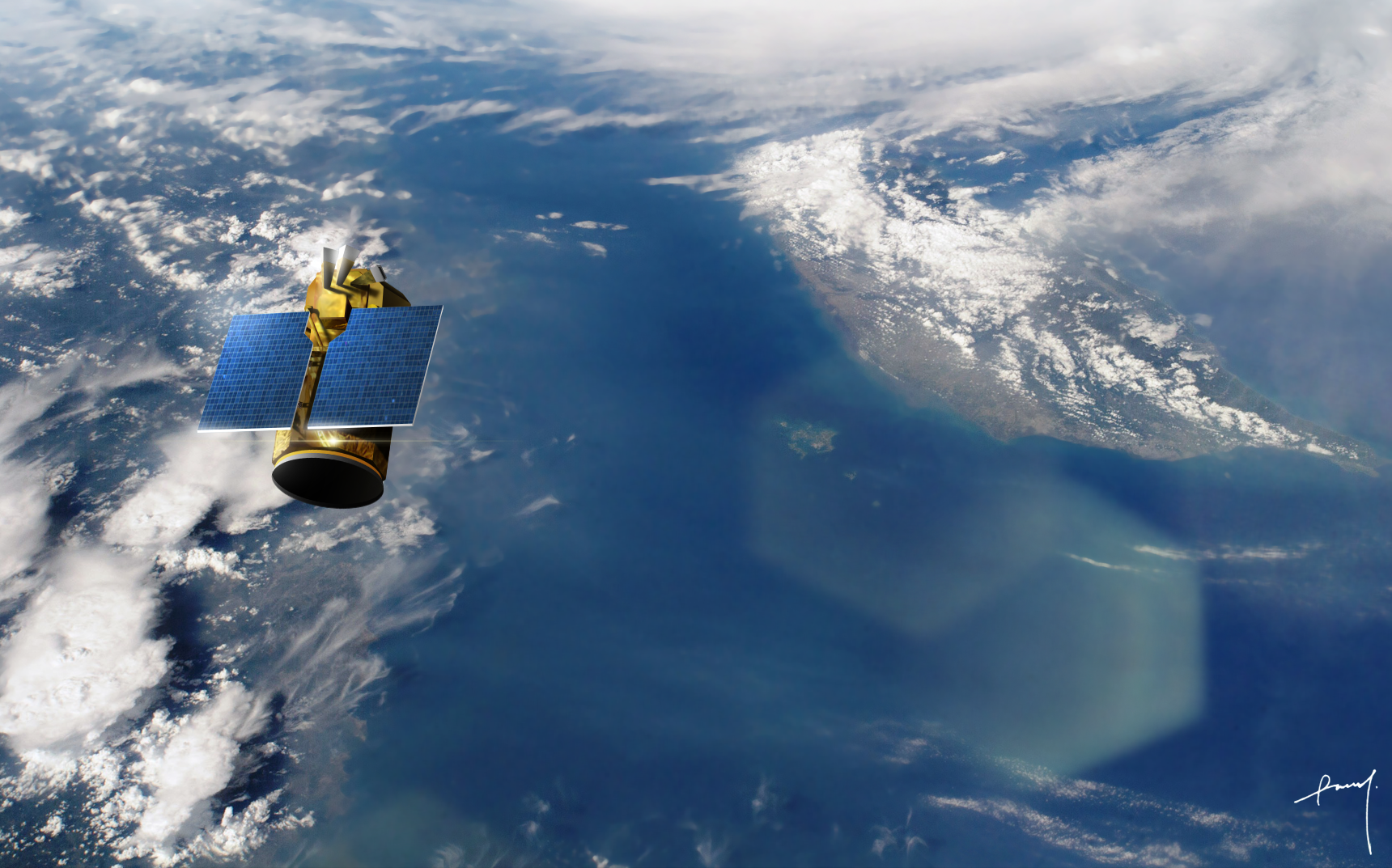
Artist's conception of FORMOSAT-5 in orbit

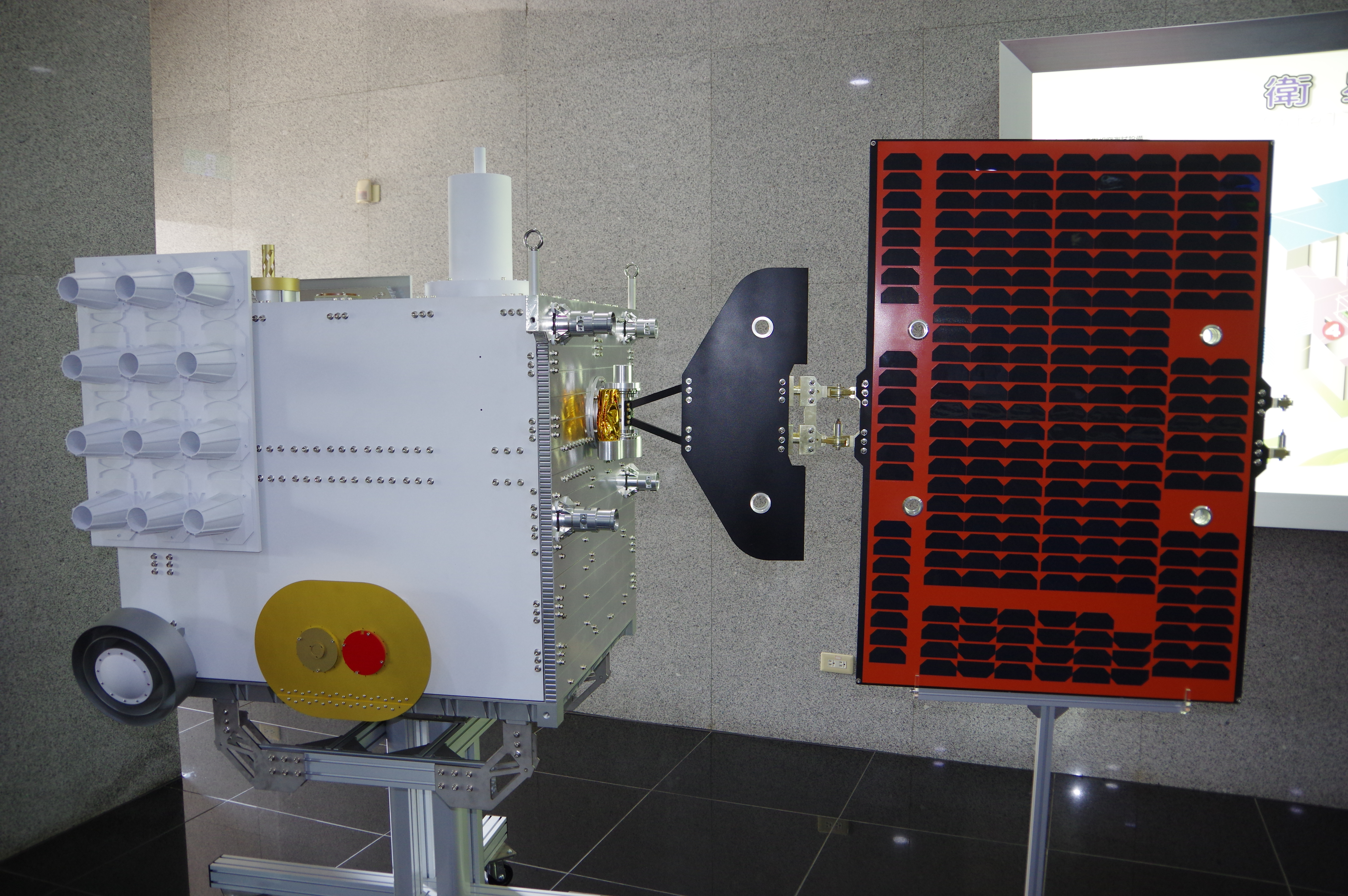
Model of FORMOSAT-7

=== 1991 ===
- 10/03
  The Executive Yuan approved the "Space Technology Long Term (15 years) Developmental Program"; established National Space Program Office.

=== 1994 ===
- 09/09
  Held a groundbreaking ceremony for the construction of Satellite Integration & Test Building
- 11/01
  Signed a frequency coordination contract with a US company Telecom Strategies
- 12/12
  Signed a ground system contract with the US company Allied Signal Technical Service Corponation (ATSC)

=== 1996 ===
- 06/30
  The completion of the five domestic component engineering model development; start the manufacture of flight unit.

=== 1997 ===
- 04/25
  Held a FORMOSAT-1 antenna installment ceremony at Tainan National Cheng Kung University.
- 05/16
  The Spacecraft Bus was delivered to the Satellite Integration & Test Building of National Space Program Office from Los Angeles, USA
- 07/11
  The Vice President Lien officiated the opening ceremony of the Satellite Integration & Test Building.

=== 1998 ===
- 06/21
  National Science Council announced the result for the "Naming and Drawing Competitions", and finalized that the satellite will be named "FORMOSAT-1"
- 10/07
  The completion of FORMOSAT-1 satellite system integration and tests.

=== 1999 ===
- 01/27
  FORMOSAT-1 was being launched into the orbit and started executing its scientific missions.
- 02/13
  The Ocean Color Imager of FORMOSAT-1 took its first ocean color image.
- 03/16
  Dr Wong Hung-Chih took on the Director General position of the National Space Program Office.
- 06/30
  Held a contract signing ceremony for the FORMOSAT-2 X-band antenna system.
- 12/15
  The commencement of the development of FORMOSAT-2.

=== 2018 ===
- 02/01
  Dr. Chun-Liang Lin took on the Director General position of National Space Organization
- 02/23
  President Tsai Meets with FORMOSAT-5 Satellite Team
- 08/03
  President of the Executive Yuan Ching-te Lai inspected FORMOSAT-7 preparation
- 09/21
  FORMOSAT-5 Imagery Service Begins

=== 2019 ===
- 02/21
  President Ing-wen Tsai Visited NSPO
- 06/25
  FORMOSAT-7 satellites launched into space by SpaceX on Falcon Heavy
- 07/17
  FORMOSAT-7/COSMIC-2 successfully observed the first Radio Occultation profile

=== 2020 ===
- 03/07
  FORMOSAT-7/COSMIC-2 atmospheric data were released
- 04/30
  FORMOSAT-3 constellation Completes its Mission with Honor

=== 2021 ===
- 01/24
  YUSAT and IDEASSAT CubeSats launched
- 02/03
  Formosat-7 constellation deployment was completed
- 05/31
  "Space Development Act" Passes Legislature's 3rd Reading
- 08/02
  professor of NCTU and head of Advanced Rocket Research Center Jong-Shin Wu established as new manager of NSPO
- 09/30
  Taiwanese seeds return from space
- 10/27
  signs contract on collaboration with NanoAvionics

=== 2023 ===
The organization is placed under the direct oversight of the National Science and Technology Council and renamed the Taiwan Space Agency. The Chinese name was not changed.

=== 2025 ===
The agency selected a site in Pingtung County for the construction of Taiwan's National Launch Site.

In summer 2025 the Industrial Technology Research Institute (ITRI) ceased its involvement in the Taiwan Space Agency's 5G LEO communications satellite project saying that they had realized that satellites were outside of their area of expertise. ITRI was replaced by private firms.

In 2025 the National Taipei University of Technology partnered with the Taiwan Space Agency, Institute for Information Industry, and ITRI to offer a three-year intensive program in satellite communications technology.

== Taiwanese rocket launch program ==
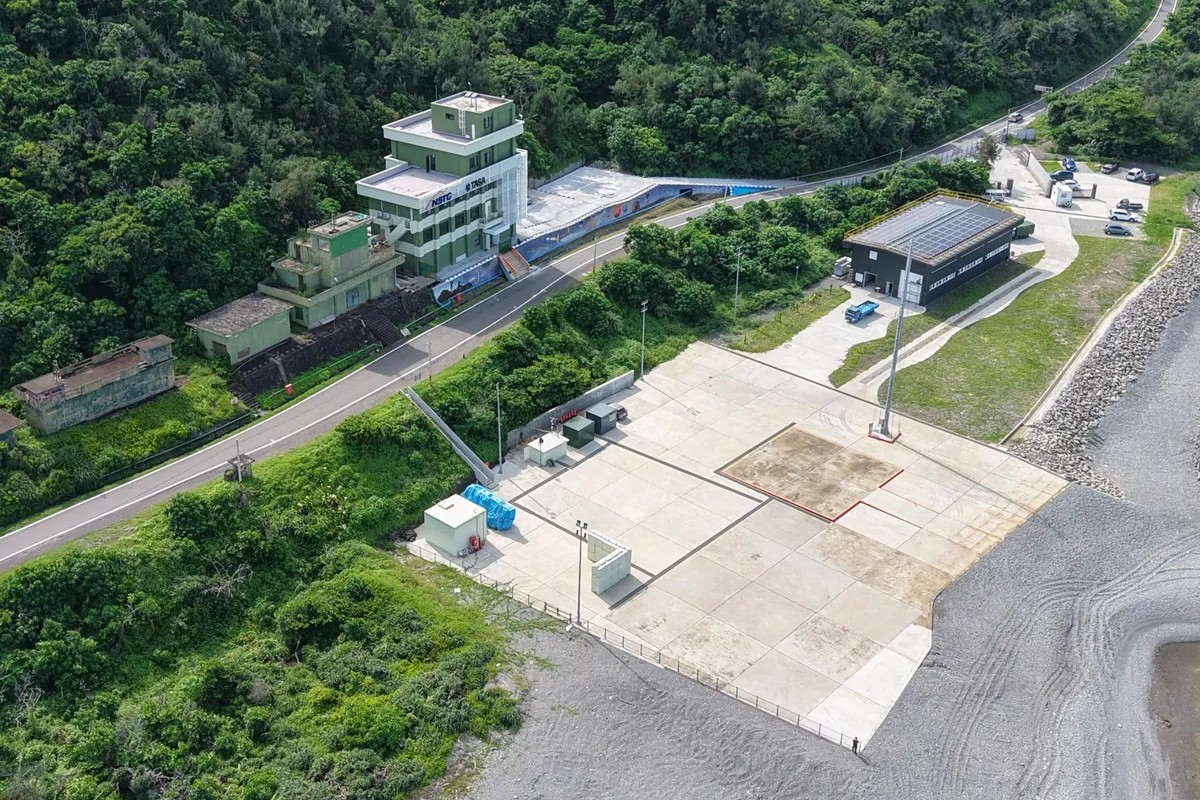
Overhead view of the Hsu-hai Rocket Research Launch Site in 2025

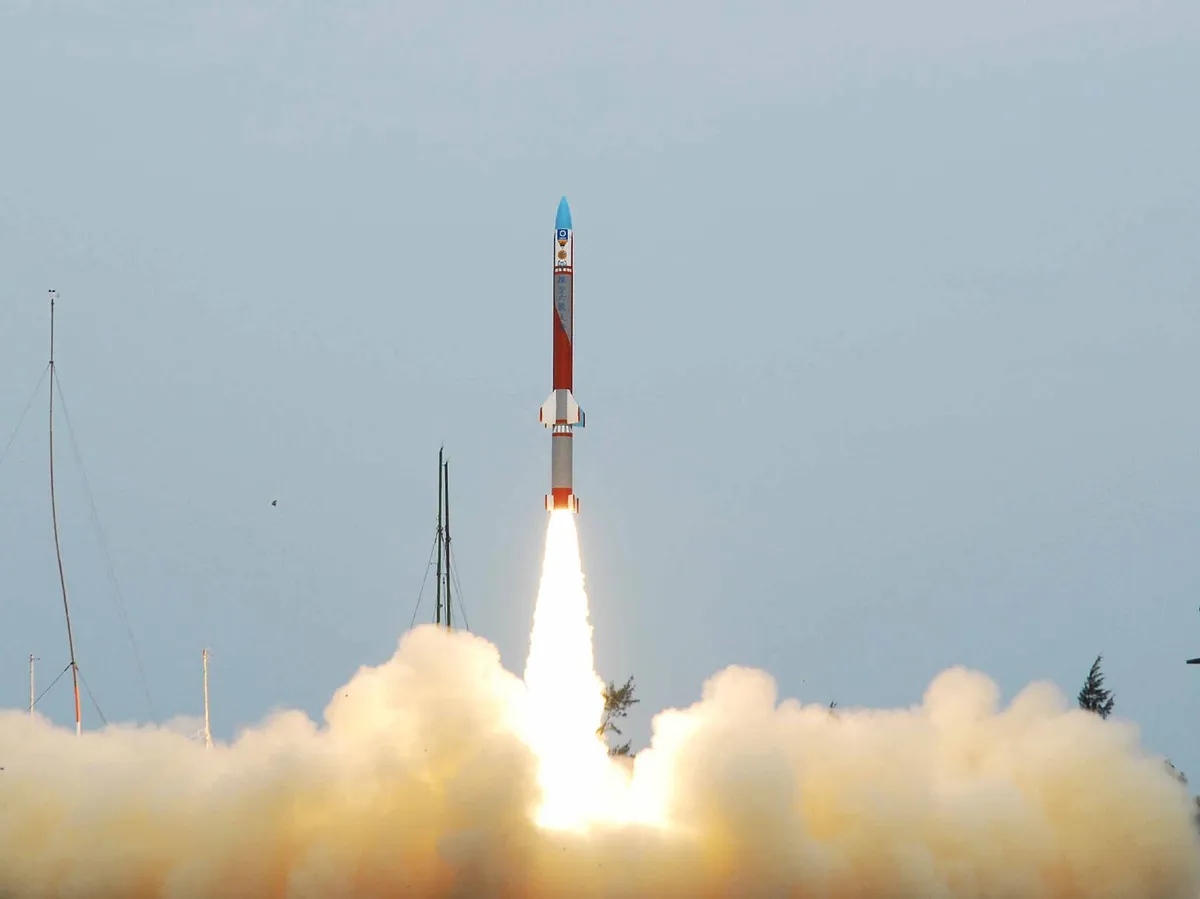
TK-2 based sounding rocket launch in 2008 from Jiupeng Military Base

TASA developed sounding rocket based on the Sky Bow II surface-to-air missile with added booster. There have been 10 launches as of 2024, with 9 successful flights.

A new sounding rocket launch site was completed in 2025. The site features an assembly hall, control building, and a launch area.

Mission	Date	Payload	Result
SR-I	15 December 1998	None	Successful first test flight
SR-II	24 October 2001	Tri-Methyl Aluminum (TMA) release experiment	Second stage ignition failure, mission lost
SR-III	24 December 2003	Tri-Methyl Aluminum (TMA)	Mission successful
SR-IV	14 December 2004	Airglow photometer, GPS receiver	Mission successful
SR-V	15 January 2006	Ion probe, 3-axis magnetometer	Mission successful
SR-VI	13 September 2007	Hydrazine-fueled reaction control system, recovery capsule	Mission successful, capsule lost in the sea due to bad weather conditions
SR-VII	10 May 2010	Ion probe	Mission successful
SR-VIII	5 June 2013	Hydrogen peroxide reaction control system, recovery capsule	Mission successful
SR-IX	26 March 2014	Ion probe	Mission successful
SR-X	7 October 2014	Ion probe	Mission successful

== Taiwanese designed and built satellites ==
=== Formosat (formerly ROCSAT) ===
The FORMOSAT (福爾摩沙衛星) name derived from Formosa and satellite (formerly ROCSAT (中華衛星), an abbreviation of Republic of China and satellite.

- Formosat-1 (formerly ROCSAT-1): Communications and ionospheric research satellite, launched in January 1999.
- Formosat-2 (formerly ROCSAT-2): Ionospheric research and surface mapping satellite, launched May 2004.
- Formosat-3/COSMIC: Constellation of six microsatellites to perform GPS occultation studies of the upper atmosphere. Collaborative project with US agencies including NASA, NOAA and the University Corporation for Atmospheric Research, launched in April 2006.
- Formosat-5: Optical earth observation and magnetic field research as a successor to the Japanese Reimei mission. Cooperation with Japan and Canada. Launch was originally planned for 2011, it was launched in 2017.
- Formosat-6 was a micro satellite project, its development was cancelled.
- Formosat-7 is a group of 6 satellites in low inclination orbits to provide meteorology data at low and mid latitudes. Launch took place in June 2019.
- Triton, The FORMOSAT-7R (TRITON) is a micro-satellite designed and manufactured by NSPO. It is planned along with the FORMOSAT-7 program, thus it continues to use FORMOSAT serial number and subjoins a letter "R" for identification. Known as the "wind hunter" the satellite will measure sea winds and provide a supplement to the FORMOSAT-7 constellation. The name "Triton" is given due to its mission. Triton was launched on October 8, 2023, by Arianespace SA from the Kourou launch complex in French Guiana. The Triton satellite will be 87% Taiwanese made, an improvement from the Formosat-7's 78%.

=== Others ===
- YamSat: Series of picosatellites (volume 1000 cubic cm, weight roughly 850 grams) designed to carry out simple short duration spectroscopy missions. Originally planned for launch in 2003 by a Russian launch vehicle but cancelled due to political pressure from the Russian government.
- Arase: JAXA mission to study the inner magnetosphere, launched 2016. Taiwan provided an instrument.
- RISESAT: microsatellite developed by Tohoku University, Japan, launched in 2019. Taiwan provided an instrument.
- Flying Squirrel, developed by National Central University and launched in 2021.
- Yushan, developed by MoGaMe Mobile Entertainment and launched in 2021.
- Lilium-1, developed by National Cheng Kung University. Launched in 2023.
- Toro, developed by Pyras Technology. Cubesat with an optical sea surface temperature measurement payload. Launched in 2024 as part of the SpaceX Transporter-11 mission.
- Nightjar, developed by Rapidtek Technologies. Cubesat with Ku-band internet of things communications payload. Launched in 2024 as part of the Transporter-11 mission.
- PARUS, a series of CubeSats. PARUS-T1A was launched in 2024 but failed to achieve orbit due to rocket failure. PARUS-T1 achieved orbit following a January 2025 launch. PARUS-T2 was launched to orbit in June 2025.
- ONGLAISAT, ONboard Globe-Looking And Imaging Satellite, subesat developed in partnership with the University of Tokyo's Intelligent Space Systems Laboratory. Features an experimental off-axis optical system, experimental imaging sensor, and an experimental data compression system. Launched in November 2024. By summer 2025 it had accomplished its research goals. It orbits at 400 km and has a main sensor resolution of 2.5m.

=== Planned missions ===
- Formosat-8, remote sensing satellite planned to follow Triton. First satellite to be launched in October 2025.
- Formosat-8B, a remote sensing satellite. It also has a science payload called Gamma-ray Transients Monitor(GTM). It is the first astronomical satellite by TASA.
- Nut, developed by National Formosa University. To be launched in June 2021.
- T.MicroSat-1, developed by Tron Future Tech. To be launched in October 2025.
- RIoT-1, developed by Rapidtek Technologies. To be launched in October 2025.
- TORO 2, developed by Pyras Technology. To be launched in October 2025.
- Lilium-2 and 3, developed by National Cheng Kung University, National Taiwan University, National Taiwan University of Science and Technology, and Tamkang University. To be launched in October 2025.

== Developments and long term plans ==
The first phase of Taiwan's space program involves the development of the human and technological resources required to build and maintain three satellite programs, which is expected to be completed with the launch of Formosat-3/COSMIC by the end of 2005. Currently, the spacecraft and instrumentation are designed and assembled in Taiwan by local and foreign corporations and shipped to the U.S. for launch by commercial space launch firms. TASA, the military, and Chungshan Institute of Science and Technology have also been working on the development of a sounding rocket for upper atmospheric studies.

The second phase is scheduled to take place between 2006 and 2018. It will involve an emphasis on developing technological integration and miniaturization capabilities required for the development of constellations of microsatellites, as well as encouraging growth in the local aerospace industry.

Since 2009, TASA has been working with university research teams in developing innovative technology to improve the overall efficiency of hybrid rockets. Nitrous oxide/HTPB propellant systems were employed with efficiency boosting designs, which resulted in great improvements in hybrid rocket performance using two patented designs. So far, several hybrid rockets have been successfully launched to 10~20 km altitudes, including a demonstration of in-flight stops/restarts. By the end of 2014, they will attempt conducting suborbital experiments to 100~200 km altitude.

There have been proposals to elevate NSPO's status to that of a national research institute, however such plans were under debate Legislative Yuan as of late 2007.

In 2019 the Ministry of Science and Technology announced an expected cost of NT$25.1 billion (US$814 million) for the third phase of the National Space Program. The third phase will see at least one satellite launched per year between 2019 and 2028.

In August 2019 Thailand's Geo-Informatics and Space Technology Development Agency announced that they would consult with TASA on developing their own indigenous satellites.

In 2021 the Taiwanese legislature passed the Space Development Promotion Act which is meant to incentivize increased private sector participation in space industries.

== See also ==
- Advanced Rocket Research Center
- List of government space agencies
- National Chung-Shan Institute of Science and Technology
- Tensor Tech
