= Formosat-2 =

Taiwanese satellite launched in 2004

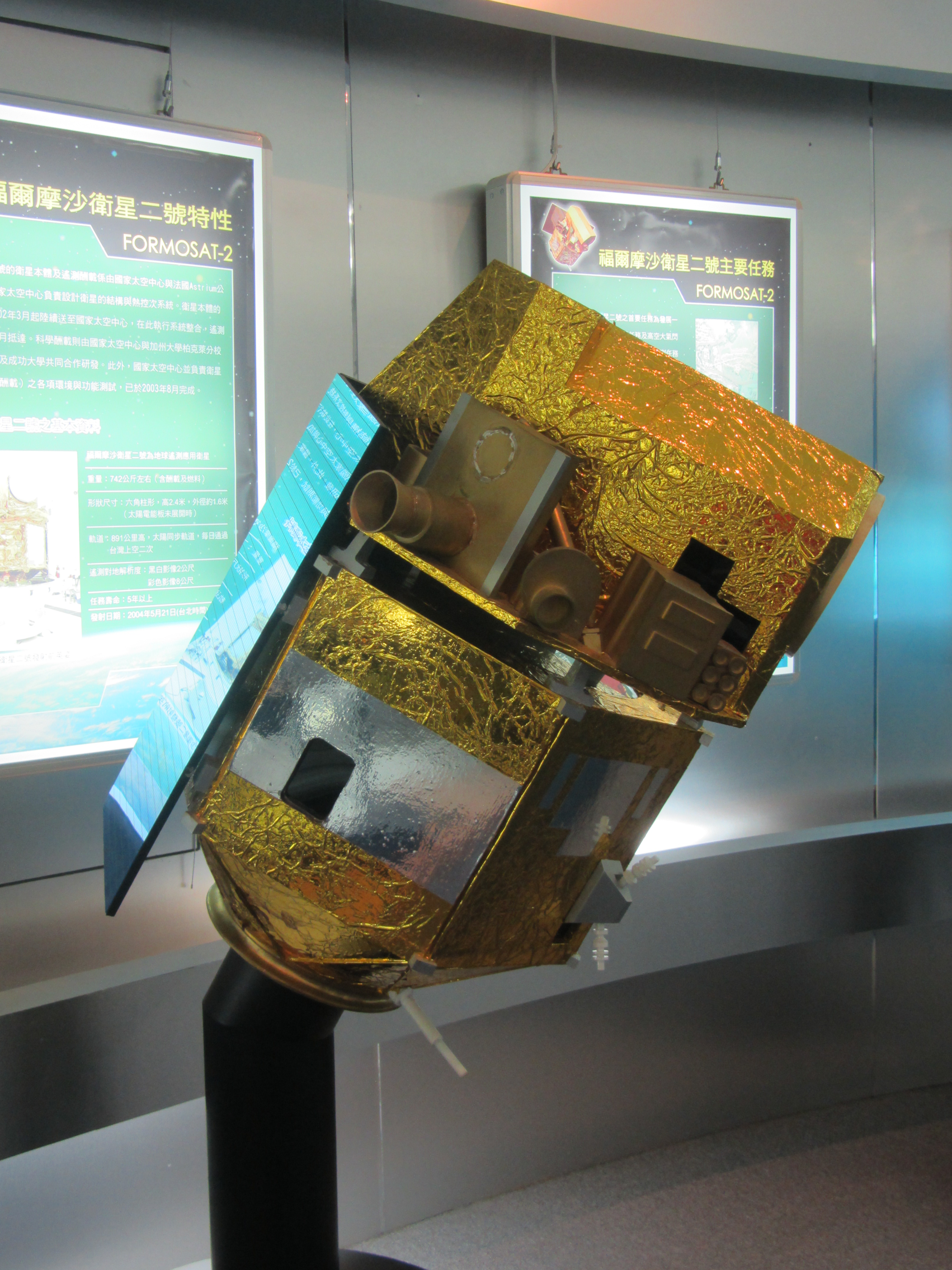
- The model of Formosat-2
- Names: ROCSAT-2
- Mission type: Earth observation
- Operator: NSPO
- COSPAR ID: 2004-018A
- SATCAT no.: 28254
- Mission duration: 12 years

Spacecraft properties
- Manufacturer: NSPO
- Launch mass: 750 kg (1,650 lb)

Start of mission
- Launch date: 19 May 2004 17:47 UTC
- Rocket: Taurus XL
- Launch site: Vandenberg Air Force Base

End of mission
- Deactivated: 19 August 2016

Orbital parameters
- Reference system: Geocentric
- Regime: Sun-synchronous

Formosat-2 (Chinese: 福爾摩沙衛星二號, formerly known as ROCSAT-2) is a decommissioned Earth observation satellite formerly operated by the National Space Organization (NSPO) of Taiwan. It was a high-resolution photographic surveillance satellite with a daily revisit capability. Images are commercially available from Astrium (formerly Spot Image).

== Launch ==
Formosat-2 was launched on 19 May 2004, 17:47 UTC from Vandenberg Air Force Base aboard a Taurus XL rocket. It had been delivered to the United States in December 2003, and had a scheduled launch date of 17 January 2004. The launch was continually delayed until May 2004. Formosat-2 was decommissioned in August 2016.

== See also ==
- Taiwan Space Agency
- 2004 in spaceflight
- ONGLAISAT
