= NCSIST Albatross =

Medium unmanned aerial vehicle

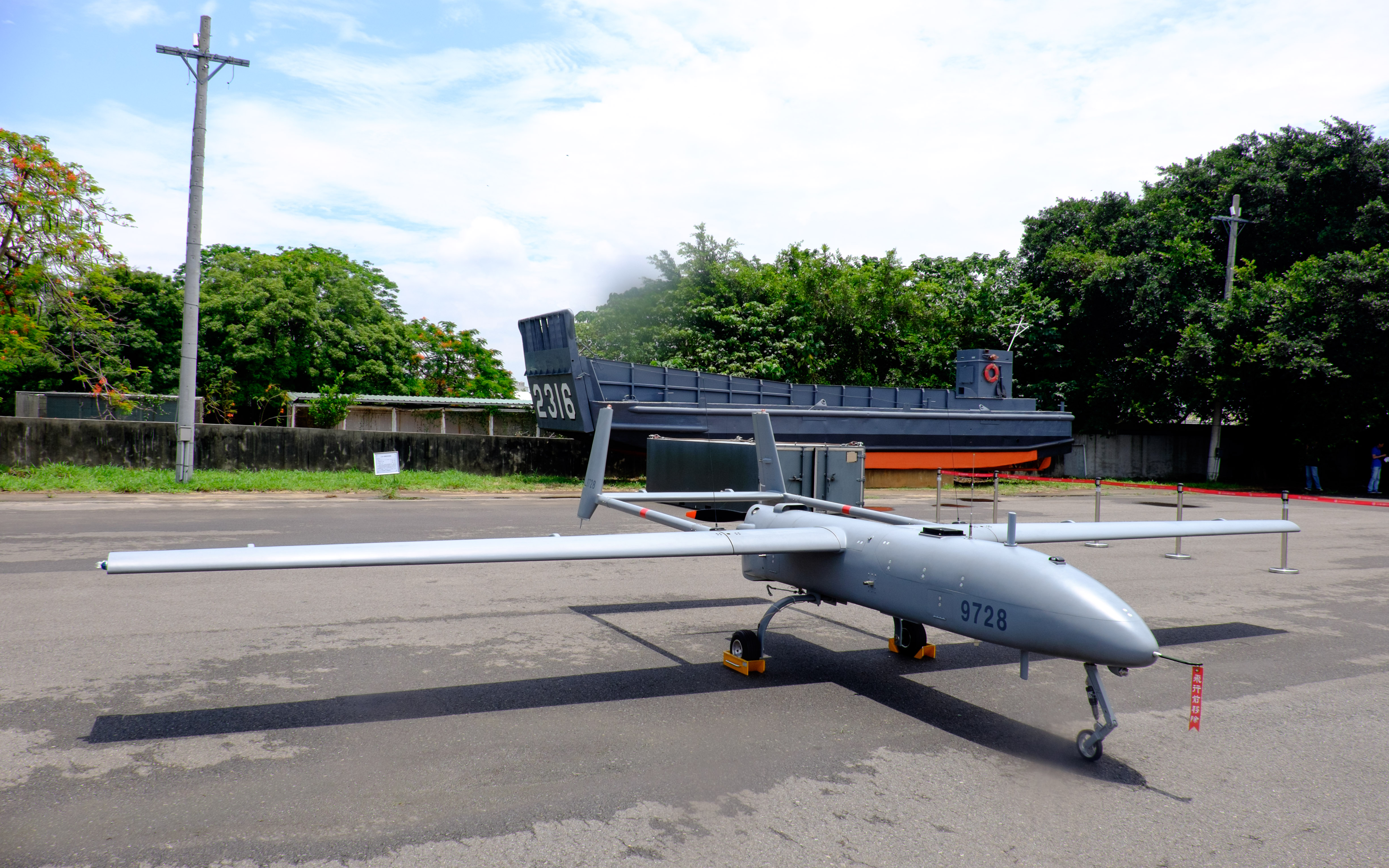

General information
- Type: UAV
- Manufacturer: National Chung-Shan Institute of Science and Technology
- Status: In service
- Primary user: Republic of China Navy
- Number built: >32

History
- Introduction date: 2007
- Developed from: Chung Shyang I

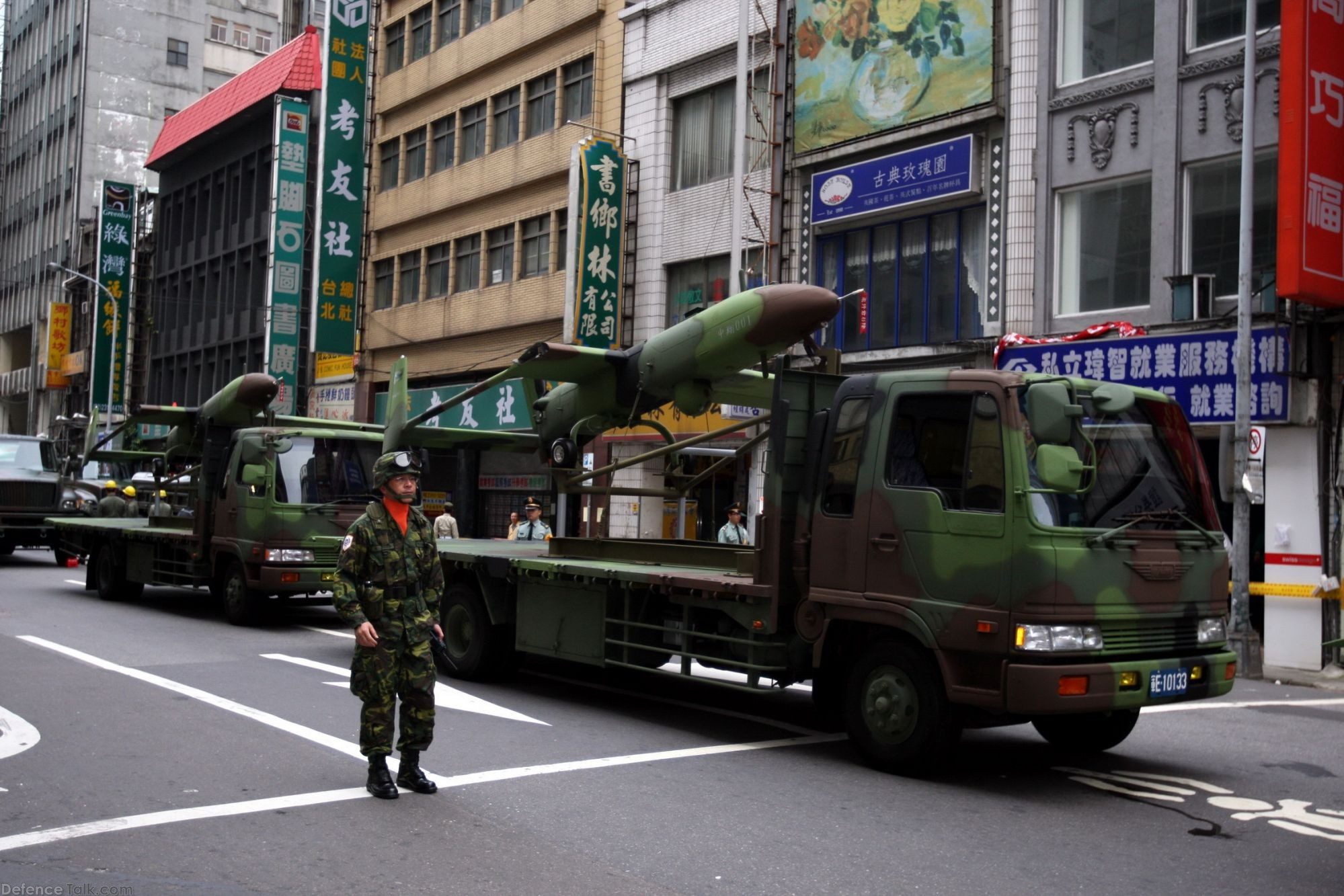
NCSIST Albatross, then called the Chung Shyang II UAV, being unveiled publicly in 2007

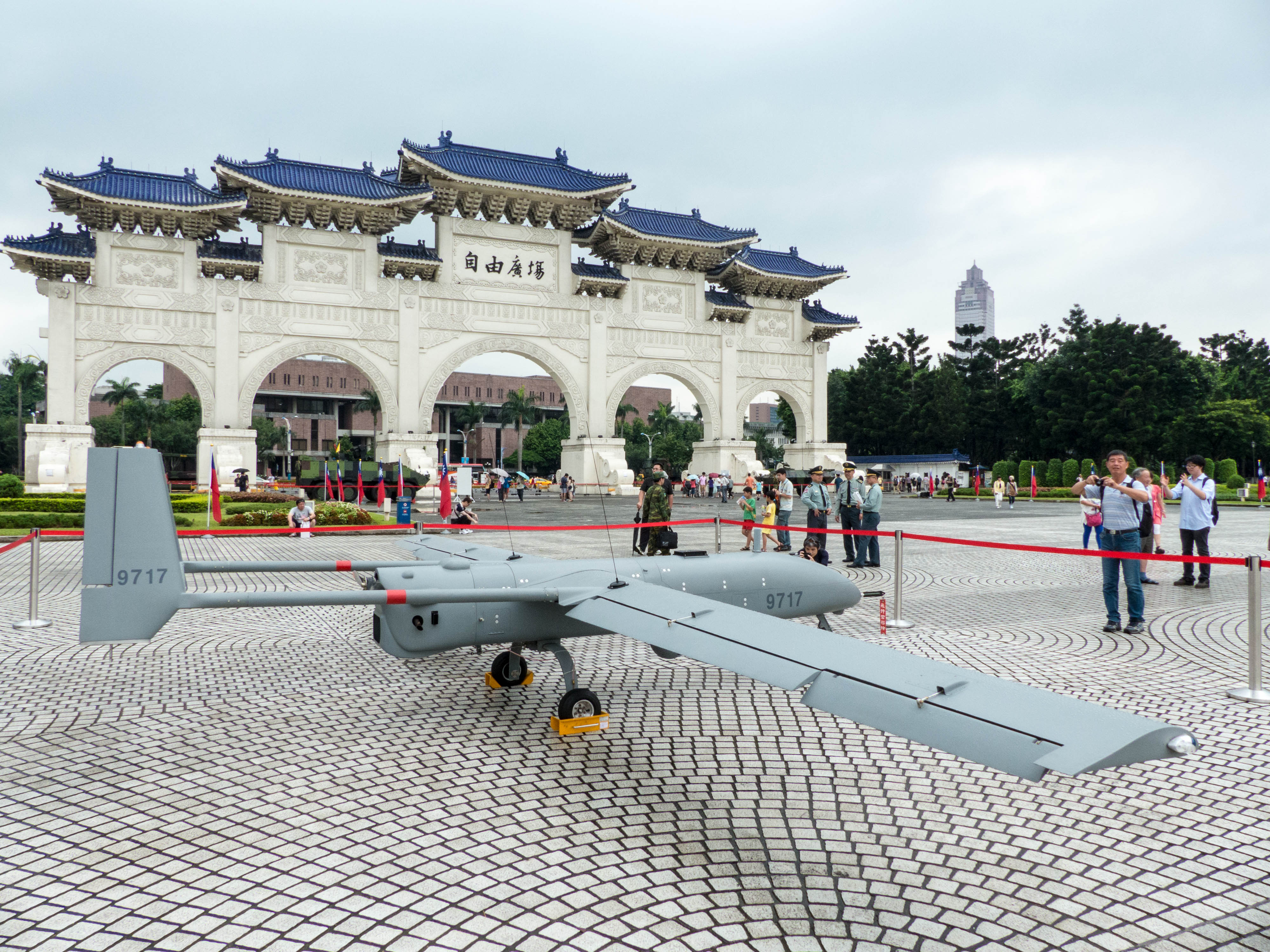
UAV 9717 on display at CKS Memorial Hall

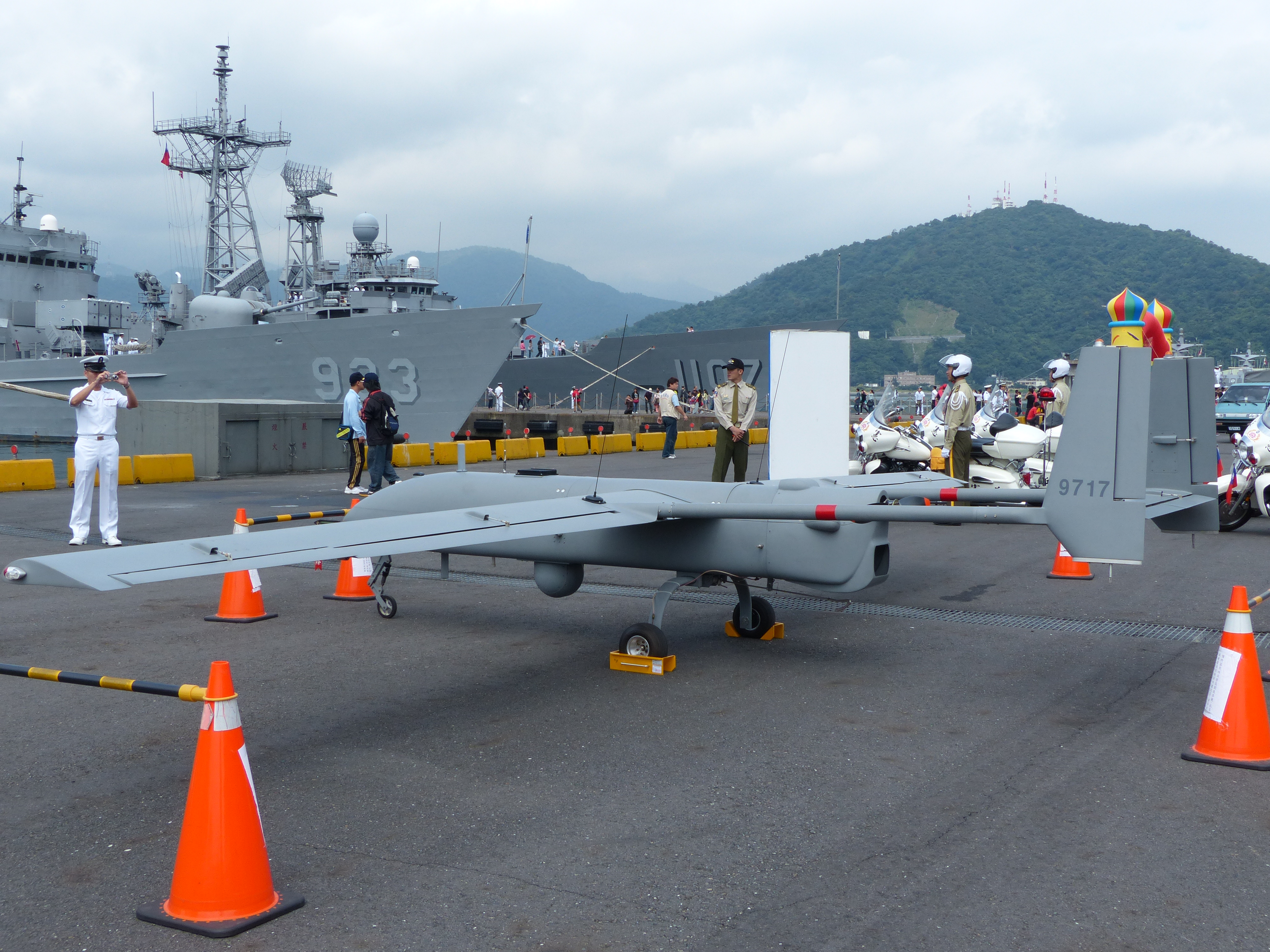
UAV 9717 on display at No.11 Pier

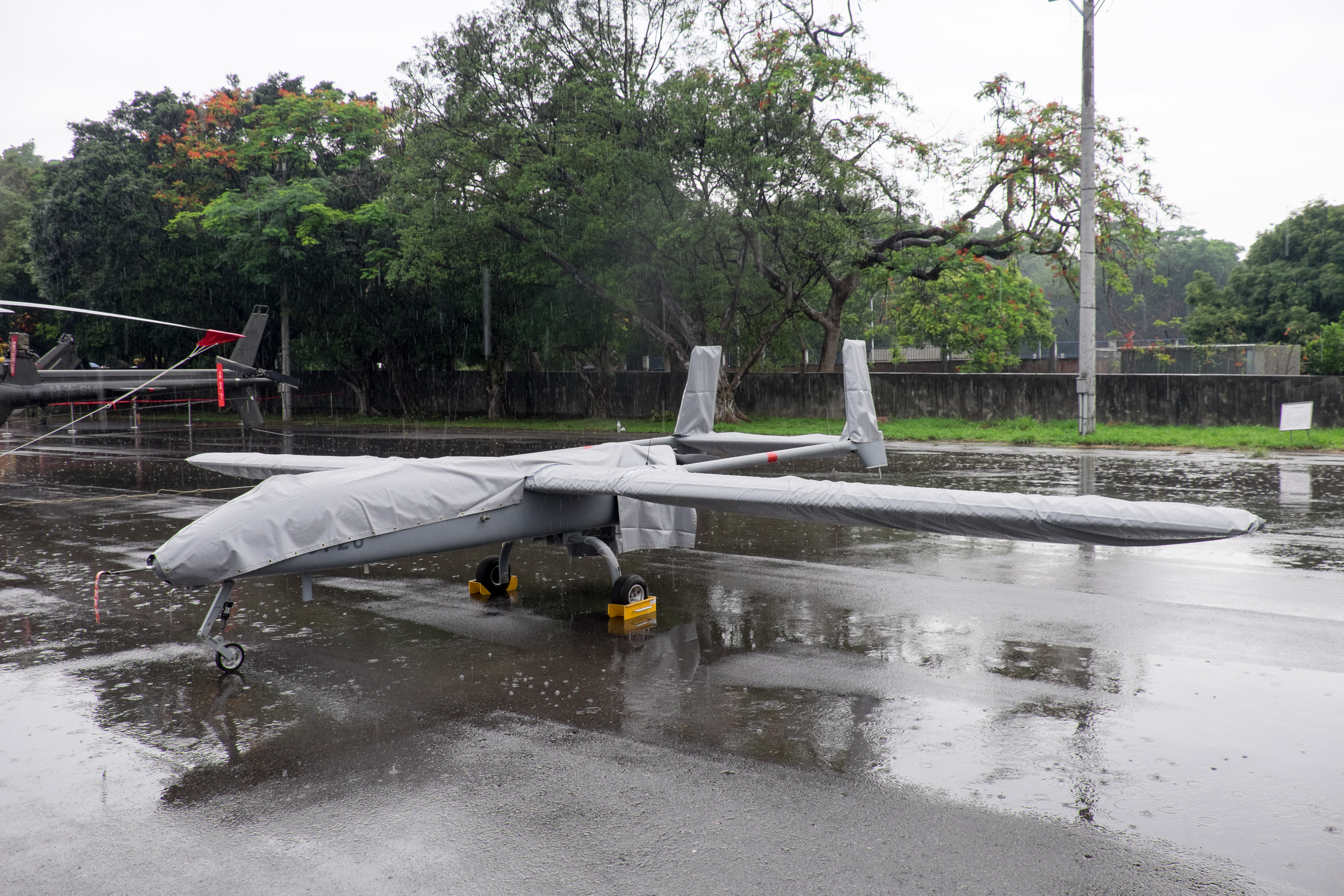
Covered UAV 9728 at Chengkungling Ground with rain cover

The Albatross (Chinese: 銳鳶, lit. 'Sharp Kite'), also known as the Chung Xiang II (Chinese: 中翔二號無人機), is a medium unmanned aerial vehicle made by National Chung-Shan Institute of Science and Technology. It is in service with the Republic of China Navy.

== Design ==
The Chung Shyang II UAV can perform surveillance, reconnaissance, target acquisition, artillery spotting and battle damage assessment sorties for the military and perform other duties such as border patrol, and aerial reconnaissance for various government agencies. It can also be used as air communication relay and carry out disaster assessment during times of disasters.

The Albatross has a wingspan of 8 meters and a range of more than 180km. Endurance is approximately 12 hours. It carries an electro-optical payload and can operate in both day and night. In addition to its military capabilities the Albatross can also be used for civilian applications such as agriculture, fisheries, animal husbandry, disaster monitoring, environmental protection, traffic control, target searching, position recognition, coastal patrol, communications relay, and hazardous terrain survey. Officials have refused to comment on whether the type can be armed.

=== Development ===
CSIST unveiled a prototype of the UAV at the Taipei Aerospace & Defense Technology Exhibition in August, 2005. CSIST began researching UAVs in 2002, which resulted in the first Chung Shyang I UAV, then later the Chung Shyang II.

== Service history ==
In 2017 the drones were transferred from the Army Aviation and Special Forces Command to the Naval Fleet Command.

In 2019 a Navy Albatross made the types first fly-over demonstration during an exercise in Pingtung.

Following a 2019 crash the military ordered upgrades to be made across the entire Albatross fleet, by May 2020 NCSIST had completed upgrades on 26 aircraft.

=== Incidents ===
The Albatross has crashed three times in 2012, 2013, and 2016.

On Jan. 24 2018, an Albatross crashed into the sea during a military exercise off of Taitung. Mechanical failure is suspected to be the cause of the crash.

In May 2021 an Albatross was brought down in the waters off Taitung County by its control team after experiencing in-flight anomalies. The control crew made the decision not to risk civilian lives by attempting to return to the airport. This was believed to be the ninth crash of the Albatross since 2012.

== Variants ==
=== Albatross II ===
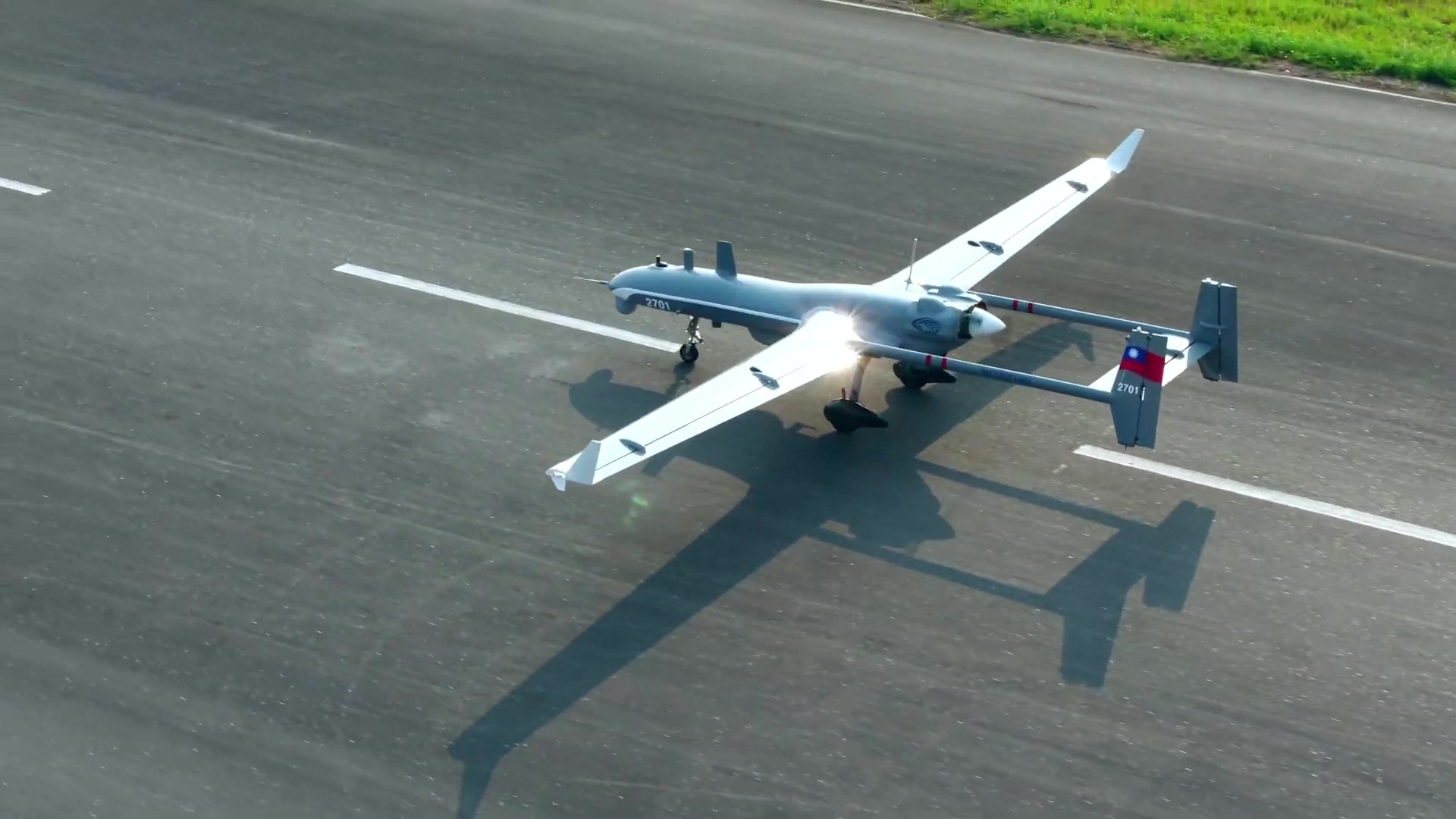
NCSIST Albatross II in September 2023

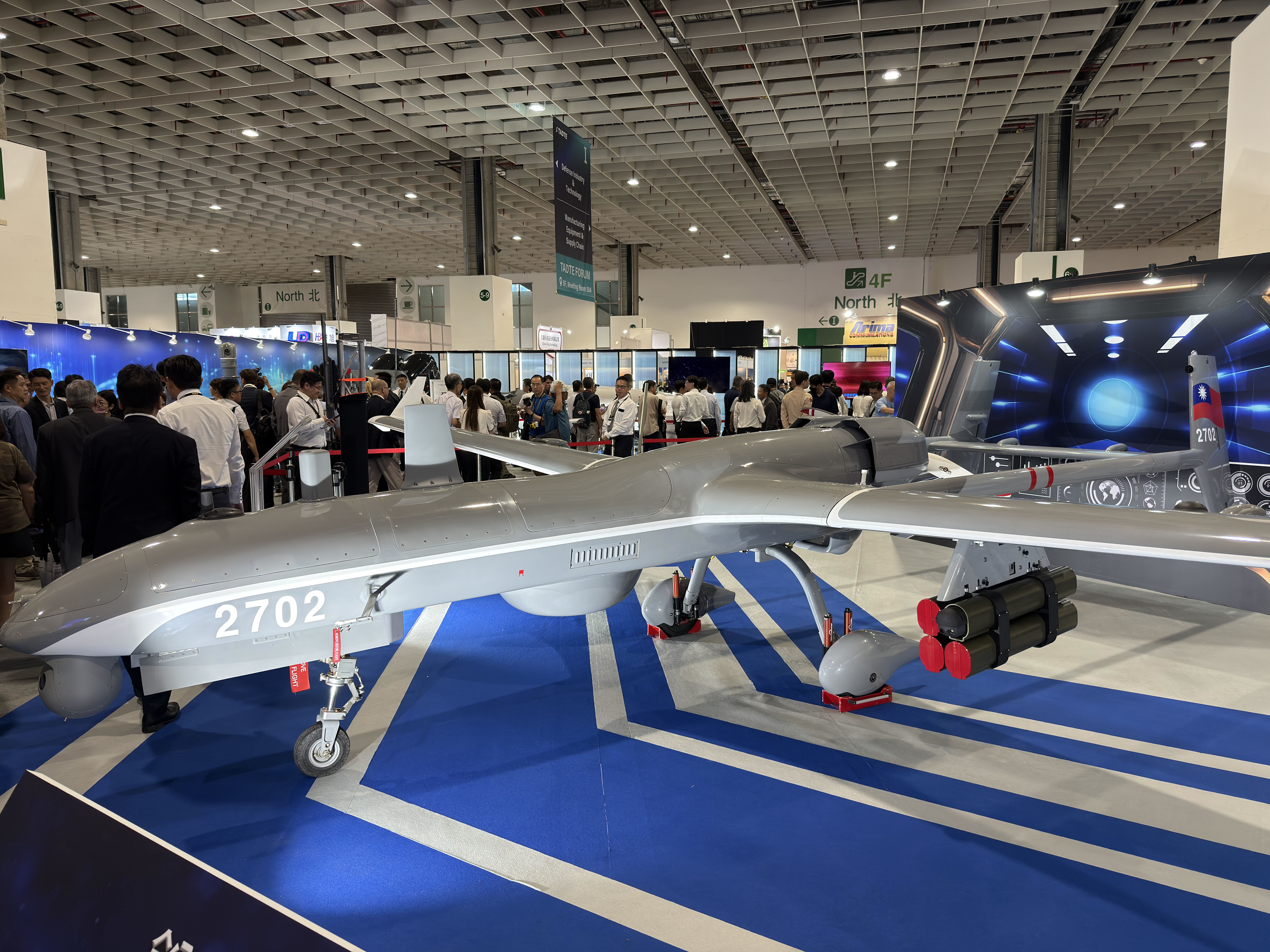
NCSIST Albatross II UAV 2702 in 2025 Taipei Aerospace & Defense Technology Exhibition

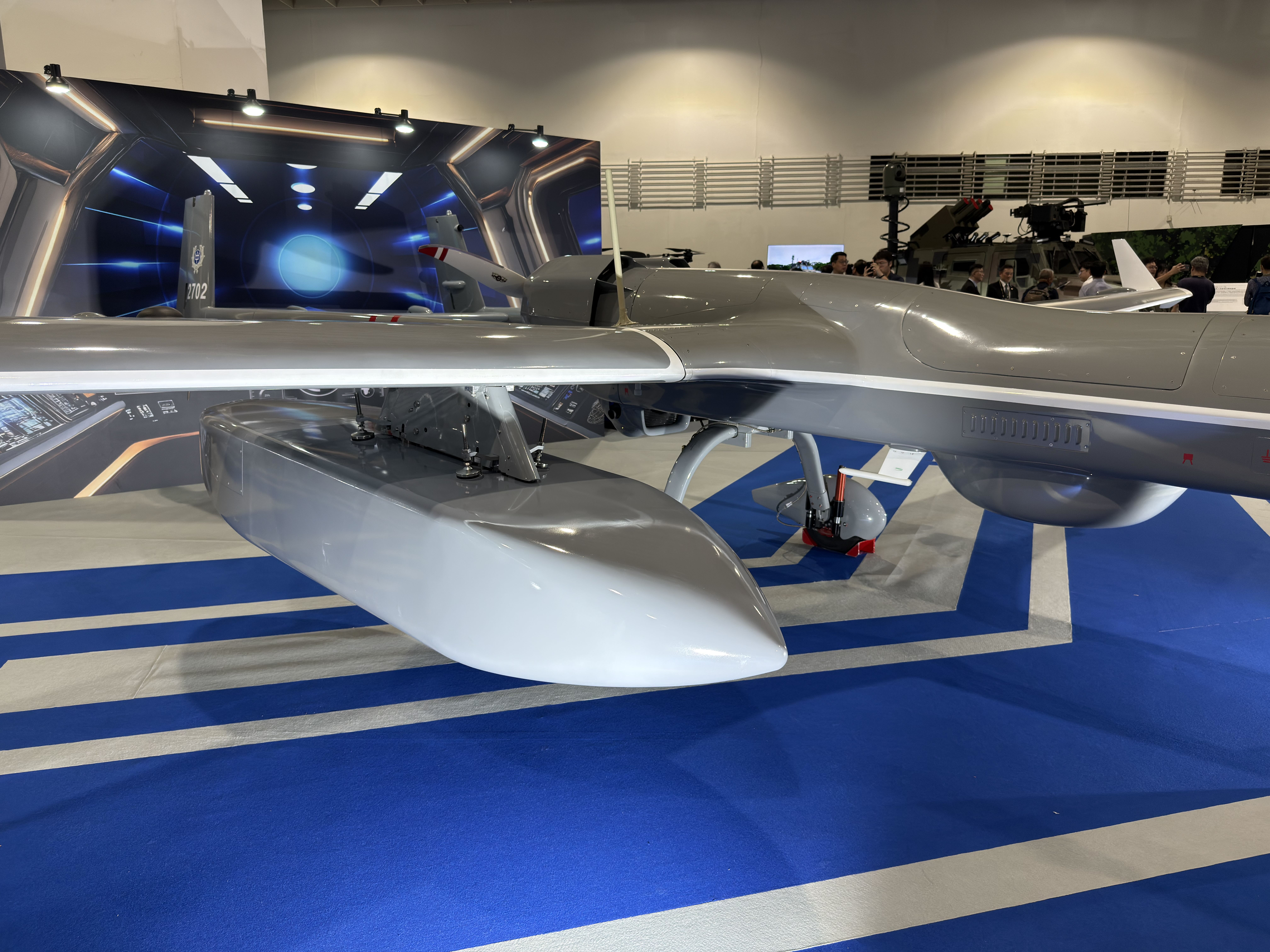
NCSIST Albatross II UAV 2702 in 2025 Taipei Aerospace & Defense Technology Exhibition

Albatross II is an improved model developed by NCSIST and GEOSAT aerospace & technology. Its range is increased with endurance, communications range, and payload also being increased. Unlike Albatross I, it has a synthetic aperture radar. It is compatible with Sky Sword missiles and 2.75in rockets. It has a reported range of 300km and a maximum loitering time of 16 hours. Artificial intelligence has also been introduced into the surveillance and tracking system. It was displayed at the Taipei Aerospace & Defense Technology Exhibition (TADTE) in 2023 and is approximately twice the size of Albatross I. At the 2025 TADTE it was displayed armed with NCSIST Mighty Hornet I loitering munitions.

== Operators ==
- Taiwan
  - Republic of China Navy- >26
- Malaysia

=== Former operators ===
- Taiwan
  - Republic of China Army 32 in service in 2014, transferred to the Republic of China Navy.

== Specifications ==
=== Albatross I ===
Data from Taiwan News

General characteristics

- Length: 5.3 m (17 ft 5 in)
- Wingspan: 8.6 m (28 ft 3 in)
- Gross weight: 317 kg (699 lb)

Performance

- Range: 180 km (110 mi, 97 nmi)
- Endurance: 12 hours
- Service ceiling: 4,000 m (13,000 ft)

=== Albatross II ===
Data from Focus Taiwan

General characteristics

Performance

- Range: 250 km (160 mi, 130 nmi)

== See also ==
- NCSIST Chien Hsiang
- IAI Searcher
- Defense industry of Taiwan
