= NCSIST Teng Yun =

UAV under development

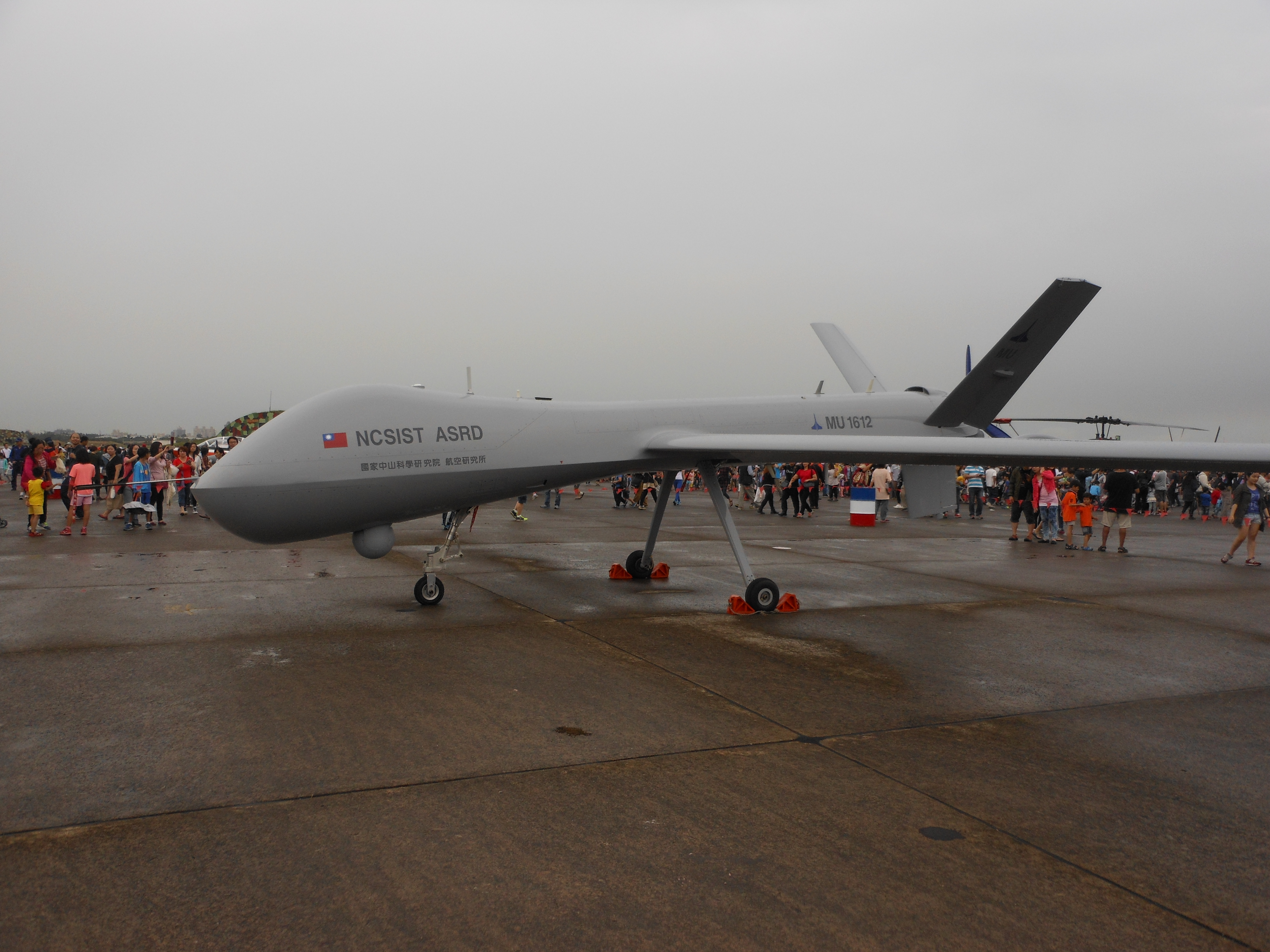

General information
- Type: Reconnaissance and Strike UAV
- Manufacturer: National Chung-Shan Institute of Science and Technology
- Status: In development
- Primary user: Republic of China Air Force

History
- Introduction date: 2007 start program and 2015 first public exhibition
- First flight: Before 2018

The Teng Yun (Chinese: 騰雲; pinyin: Téng yún, “Cloud Rider”) is a UAV under development by the National Chung-Shan Institute of Science and Technology (NCSIST) of Taiwan.

== Overview ==
The Teng Yun is a medium UCAV with a resemblance to the American MQ-9 Reaper. The 2019 defense budget allocated funds to build a significant number of Teng Yun systems.

== Development ==
A prototype was exhibited at the Taipei Aerospace & Defense Technology Exhibition in 2015. An updated model with underwing hard points was exhibited in 2017.

In 2018 a Teng Yun being tested was observed by residents of Taitung. Taiwan’s Air Force declined to procure the platform over concerns about the reliability of its electronic systems. In response NCSIST introduced an improved model with enhanced thrust, greater-range, more payloads, an enhanced flight control system, and a triple-backup power system. NCSIST has announced that the improved the version of the Teng Yun would commence testing in January 2020 with combat testing to be conducted in 2021. Pictures of the improved version first surfaced in 2020. The improved version has a wider fuselage, a larger air intake, and more closely resembles the MQ-9 Reaper. In June 2022 one of the improved variants, dubbed the Teng Yun 2, completed a ten hour test flight.

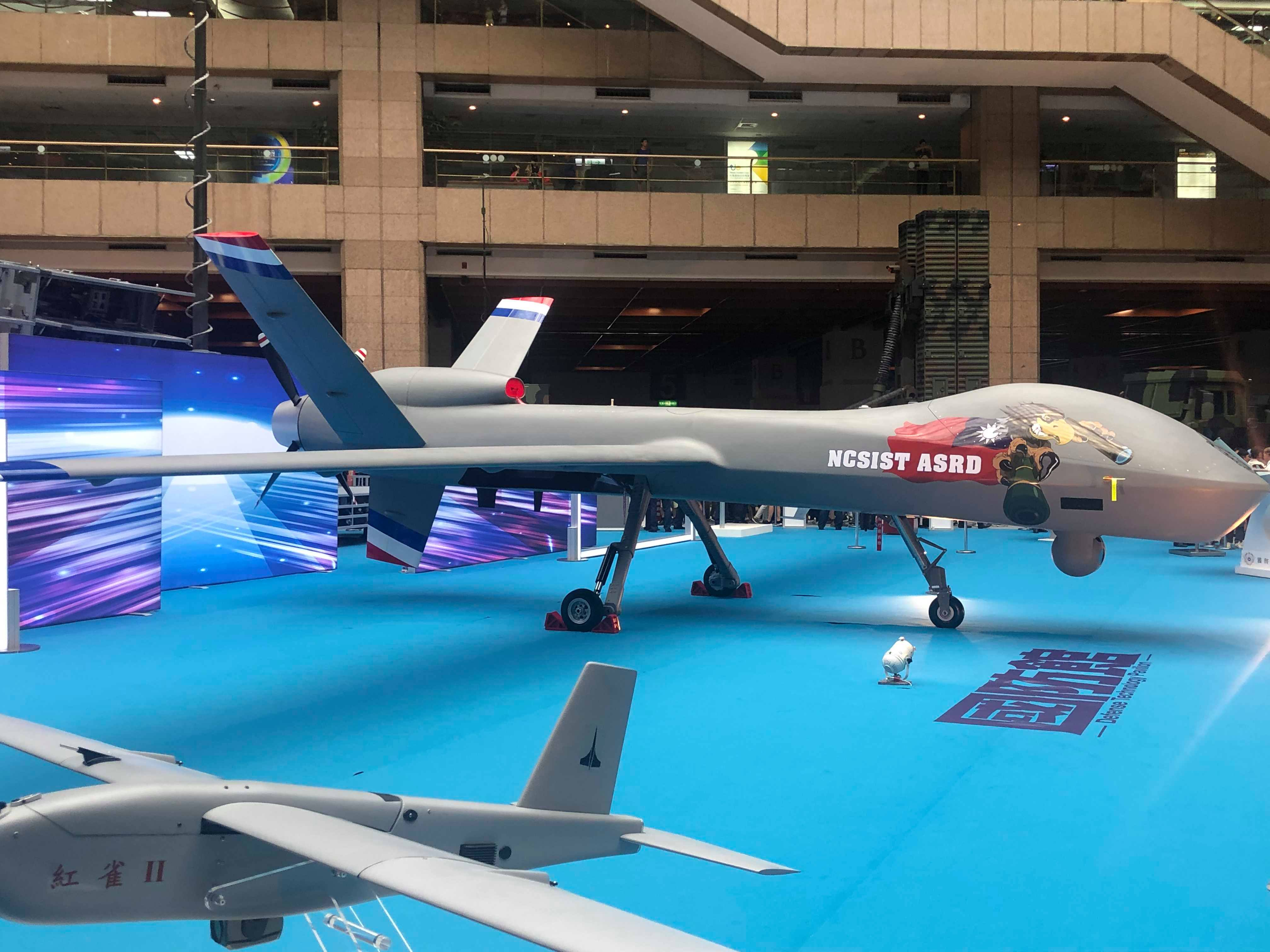
A model of Teng Yun 2 in TADTE 2019

== Incidents ==
In February 2021 one prototype of the first generation Teng Yun crashed in Taitung Forest Park during a test flight.

== General characteristics ==
- Primary Function: reconnaissance and strike UAV
- Power Plant: turboprop
- Range: >1,000km
- Endurance: 24 hours
- Ceiling: 25,000 feet

== See also ==
- CAIG Wing Loong
- DRDO Rustom
- EADS Harfang
- General Atomics MQ-9 Reaper
- IAI Heron
- TAI Anka
- Defense industry of Taiwan
