= National Launch Site =

Future spaceport in Pingtung, Taiwan

The National Launch Site is a spaceport planned by the Taiwan Space Agency. It will be located in Pingtung County and is expected to be completed in the 2030s. The spaceport is planned to incorporate tourist attractions as well as a rocket launch site.

== History ==
The National Launch Site is part of an Executive Yuan plan to develop Taiwan's satellite industries. The Taiwan Space Agency says the site will "promote the development of space technologies and industries" and train "space talents." The Taiwanese government views direct access to space as essential to preserving Taiwan's sovereignty.

Taiwan's government announced regulations for the site in 2022. Selection was tightened and promised by the end of 2024. In 2025 TASA announced its selection of Manzhou township (滿州) in Pingtung country as the National Launch Site's location. The decision came down to Manzhou and Daren township (達仁) in Taitung County. Within Manzhou township the site would be located in Jiupeng village.

== Hsu-hai Rocket Research Launch Site ==
Tamkang University launched the Tamkang I from the Hsu-hai launch site in 2023.

A new sounding rocket launch complex was inaugurated at Hsu-hai in 2025 as part of the National Launch Site project. For facilities it primarily uses a series of converted military test bunkers that were part of Jiupeng Military Base. The site is also known as the Hsu-Hai Rocket Research Launch Site and had completed ten sounding rocket launched by October 2025. It is primarily intended to support educational and scientific launches.

National Cheng Kung University's AfterLight 1 was launched on November 22, it was the 11th launch from the facility since its inauguration. Tamkang University's Tamkang II (the University's fourth rocket) was launched on November 23 with an avionics development payload.

=== Gallery ===
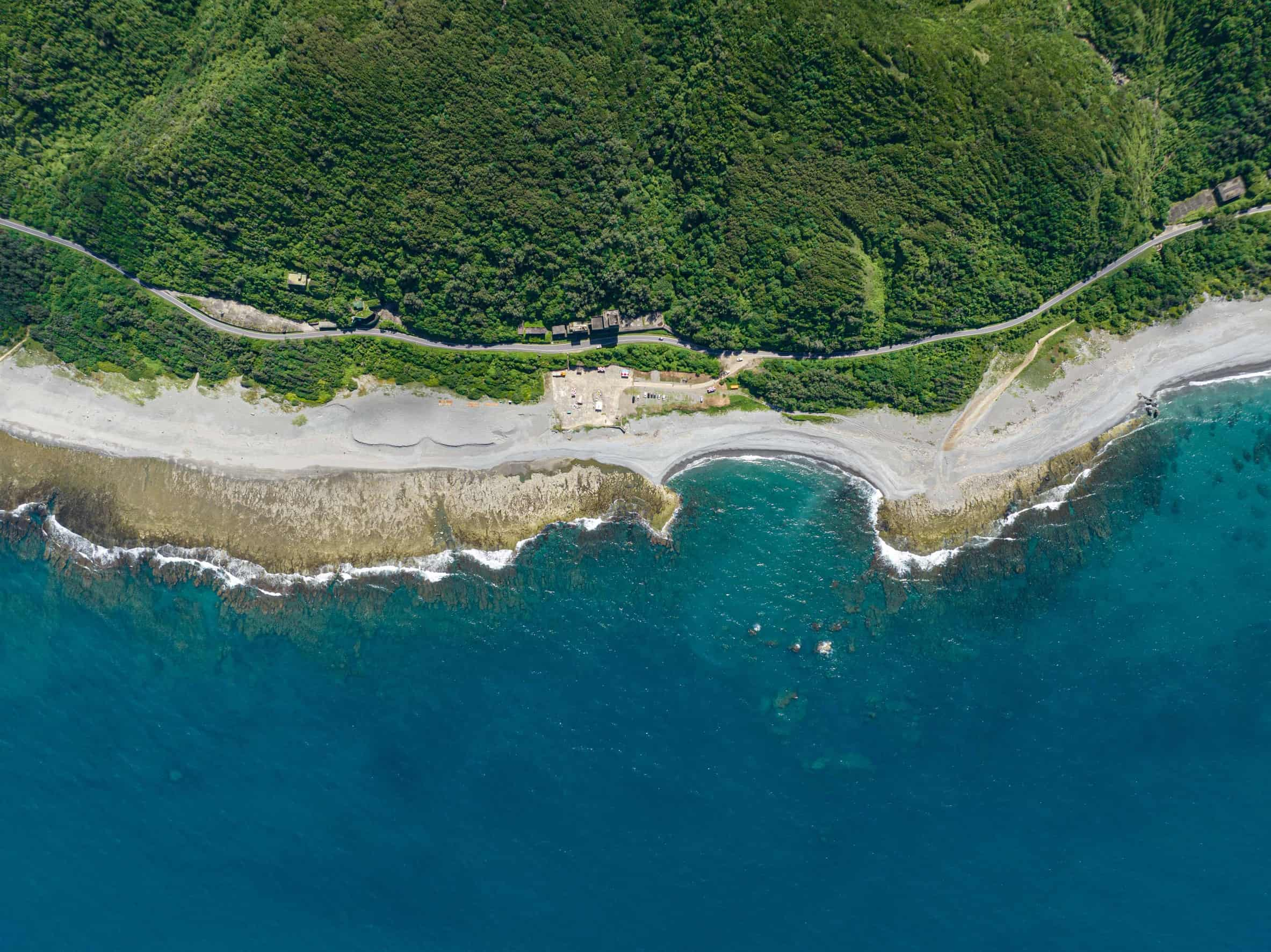
Overhead view of the site in 2022

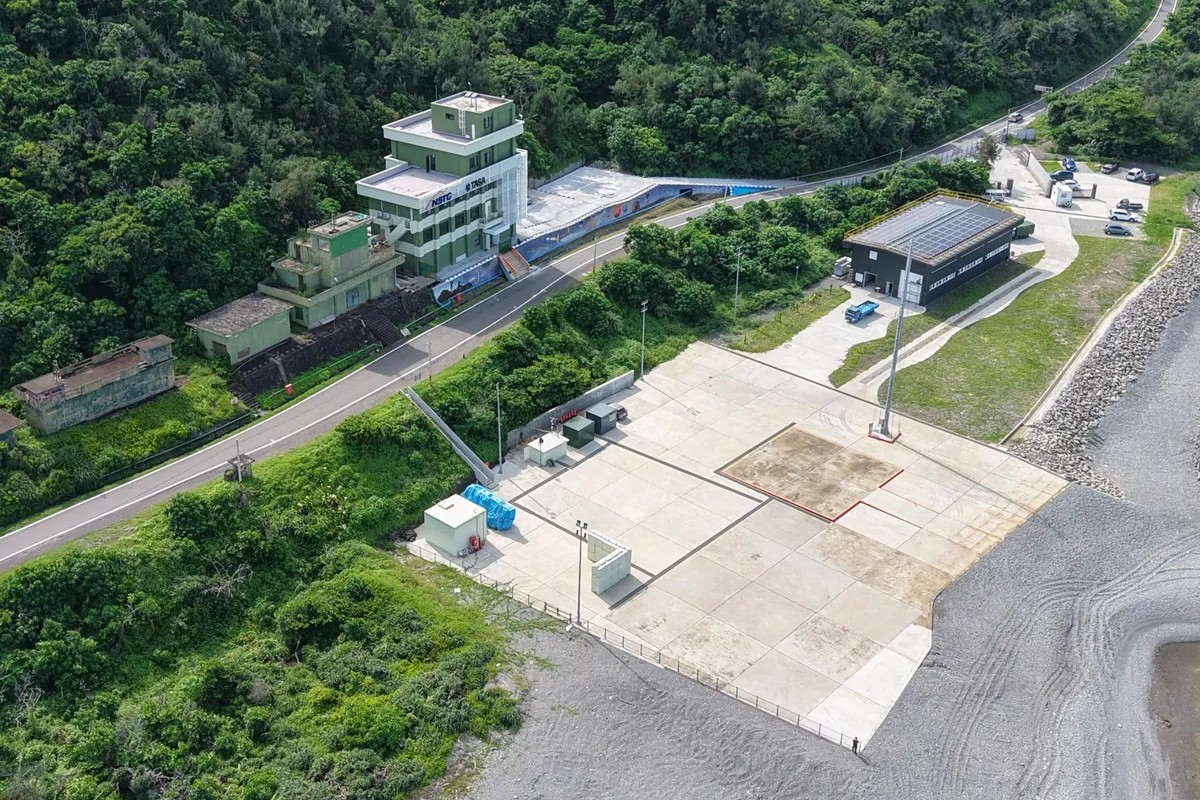
Overhead view of the site in 2025

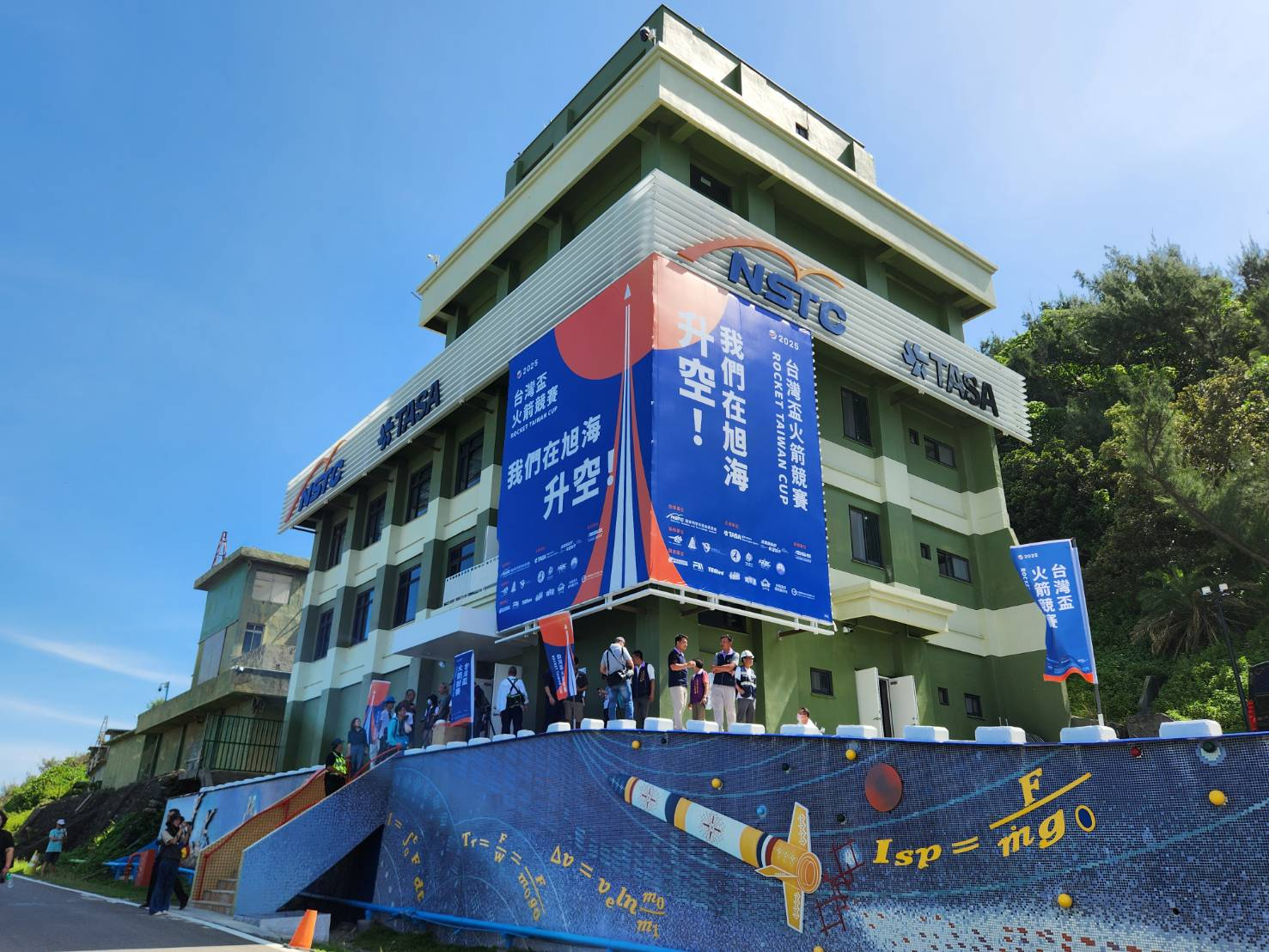
Hsu-hai (or Xuhai) rocket launch site control building in 2025

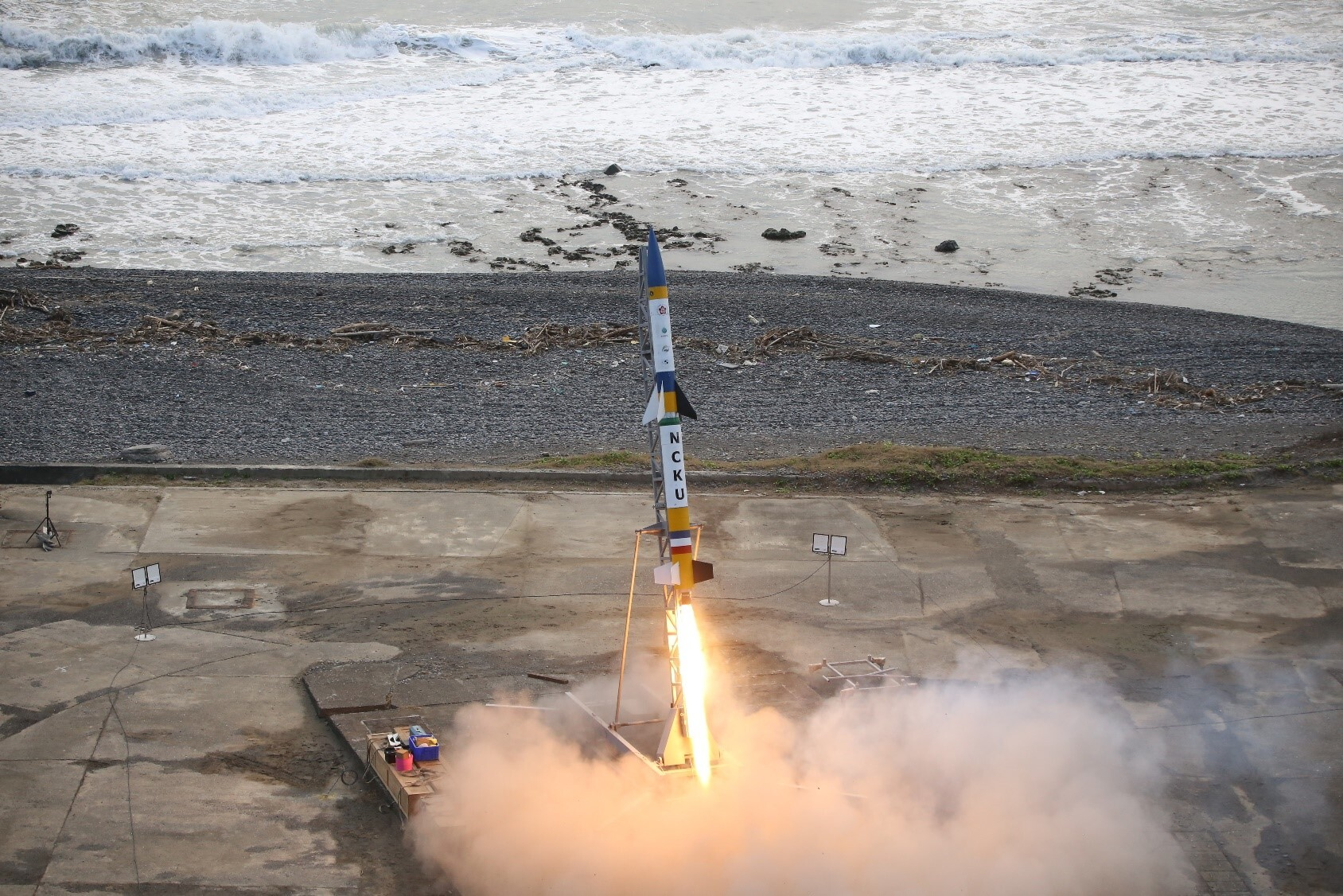
NCKU hybrid sounding rocket launch in 2022

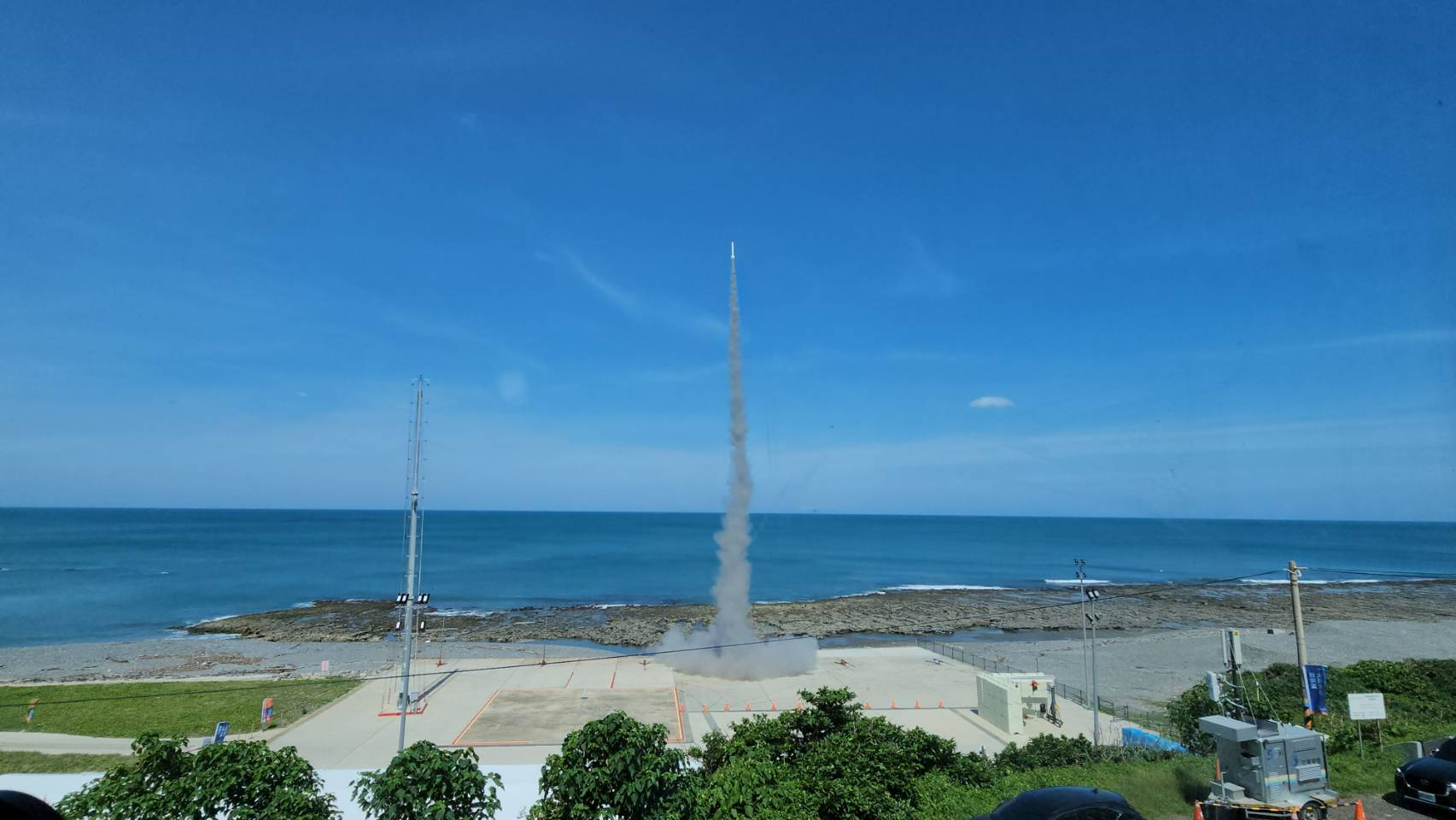
Sounding rocket launch in 2025

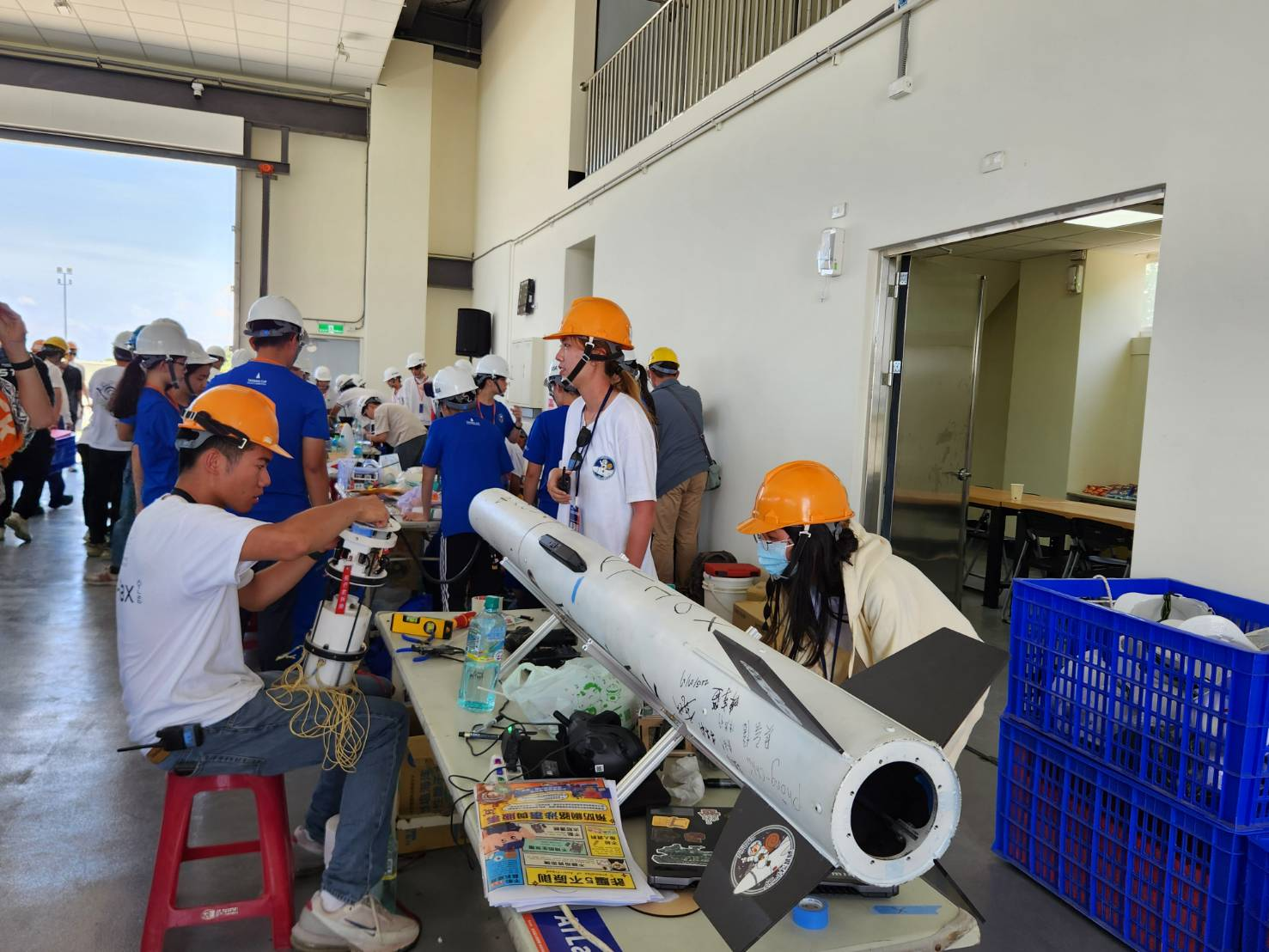
Educational rocket assembly in 2025

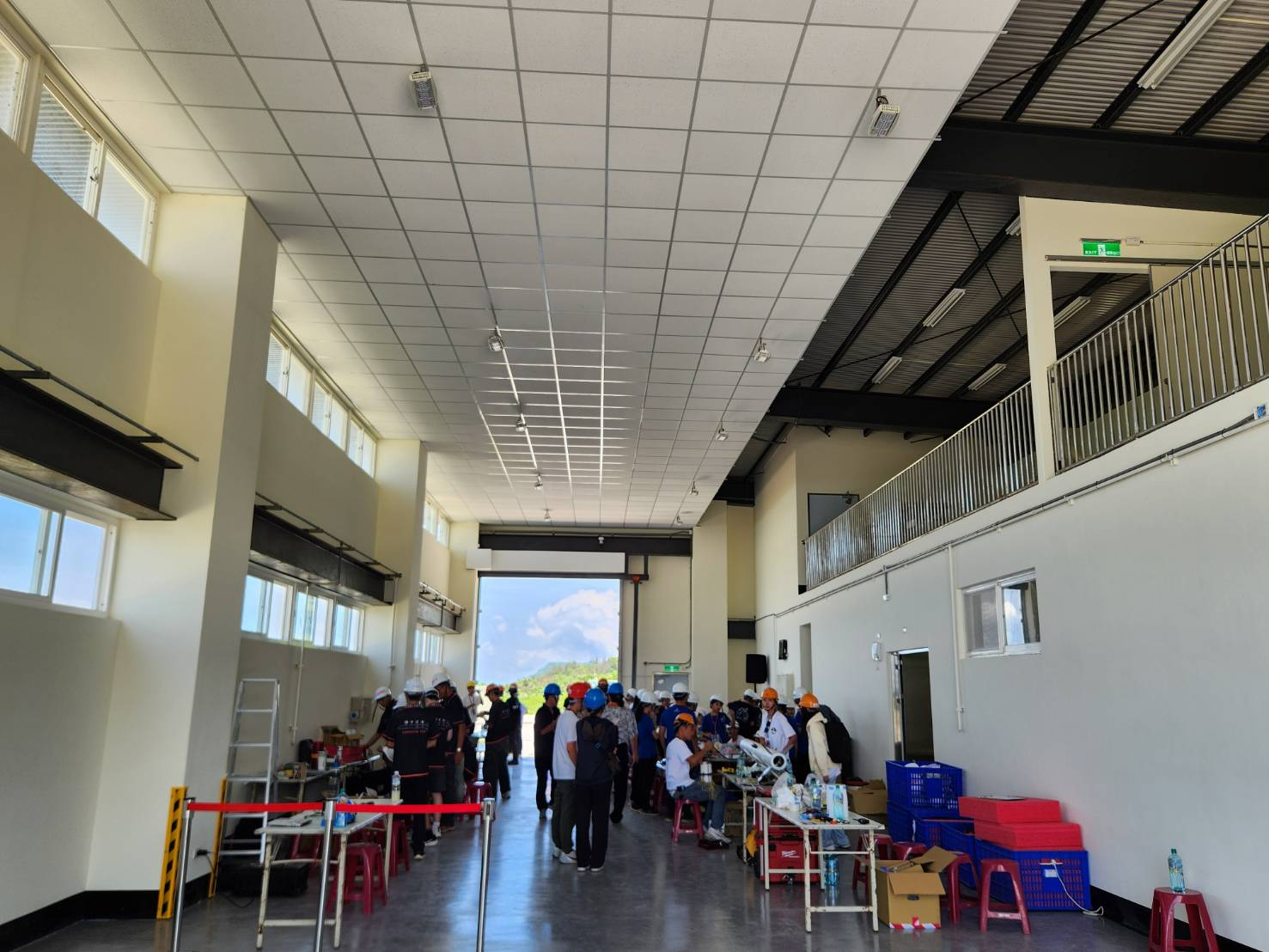
Assembly hall interior in 2025

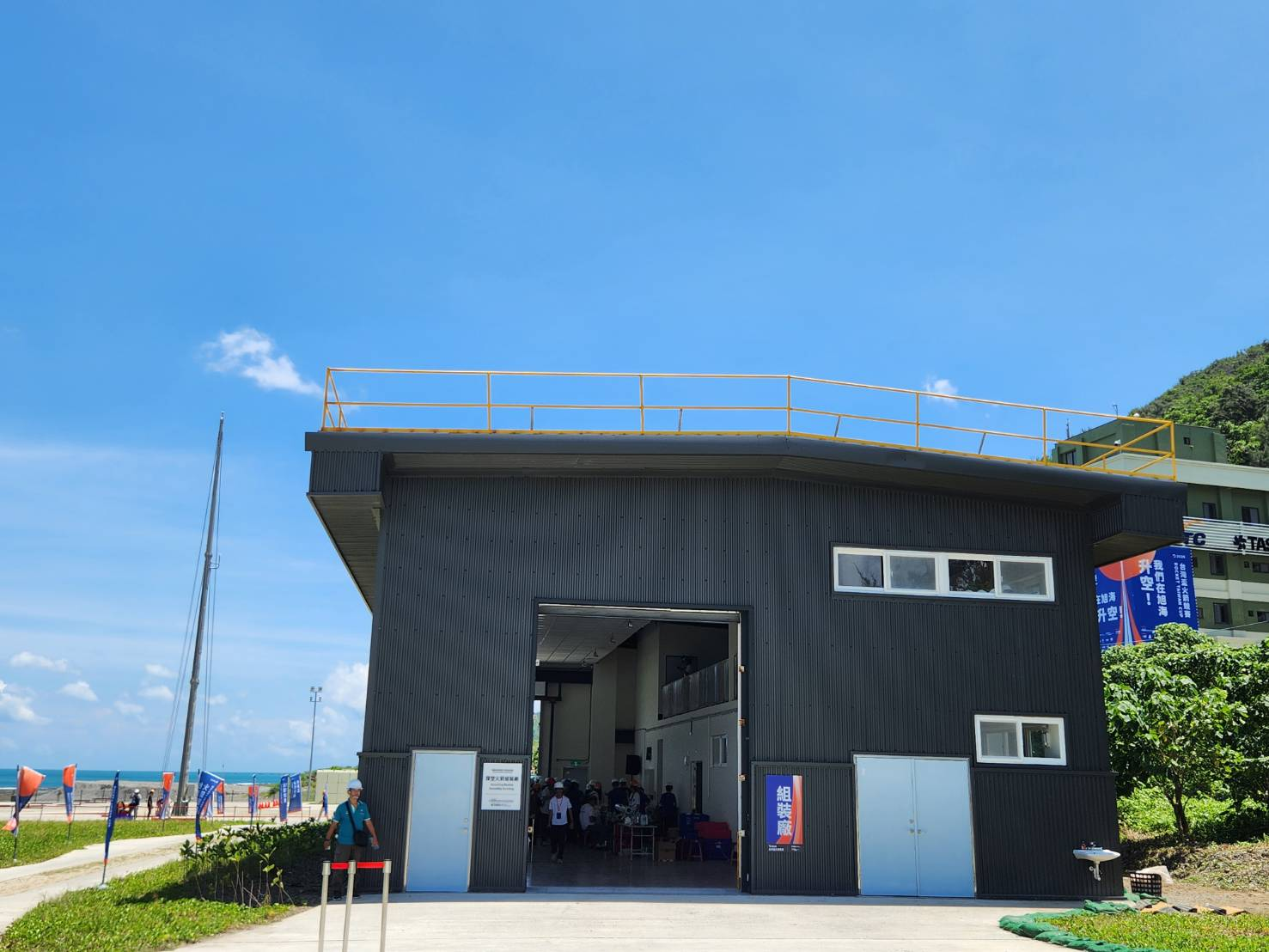
Assembly hall exterior in 2025

== See also ==
- Jiupeng Military Base
