= Jiupeng Military Base =

Military research and development facility in Taiwan

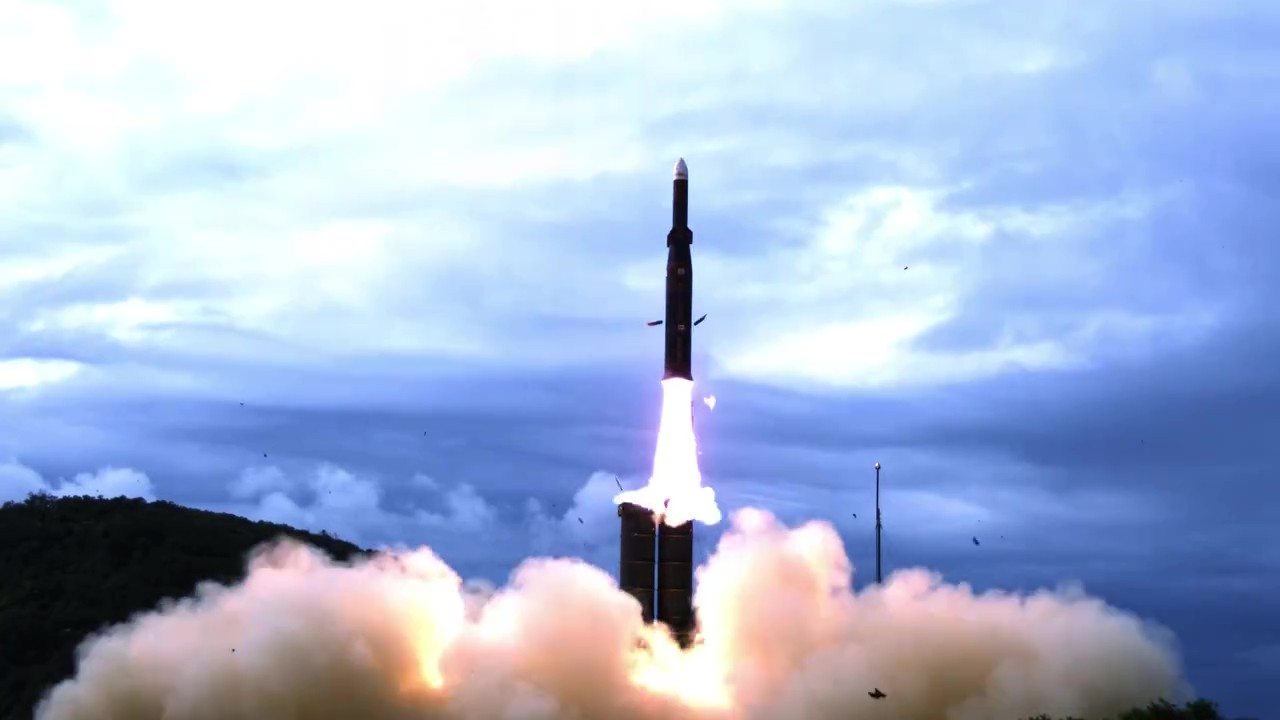
Launch of TK-4 anti-ballistic missile during testing at Jiupeng

Jiupeng Military Base is Taiwan's primary military research and development center and also contains facilities associated with the National Chung-Shan Institute of Science and Technology (NCSIST) and Taiwan Space Agency (TASA). It borders Manzhou, Pingtung.

== History ==
In 2022 the National Chung-Shan Institute of Science and Technology (NCSIST) completed a locally designed propellant factory at the base. The facility allows for increased production of missiles and rockets.

In 2023 an accident at a NCSIST small arms ammunition disposal facility on the base injured four.

In May 2025, newly supplied HIMARS units were tested at Jiupeng in front of the press, a rarity for the secretive facility.

In August 2025, the base hosted unmanned surface vehicle testing including the NCSIST Kuai Chi.

In 2025 the base was involved in the testing of the Sky Bow IV system.

== Facilities ==
The base also includes extensive offshore ranges used in the testing of naval weapons like the Hsiung Feng III.

Some seaside test facilities have been transferred to the Taiwan Space Agency for use in the National Launch Site project including the Hsu-hai Rocket Research Launch Site.

== Gallery ==
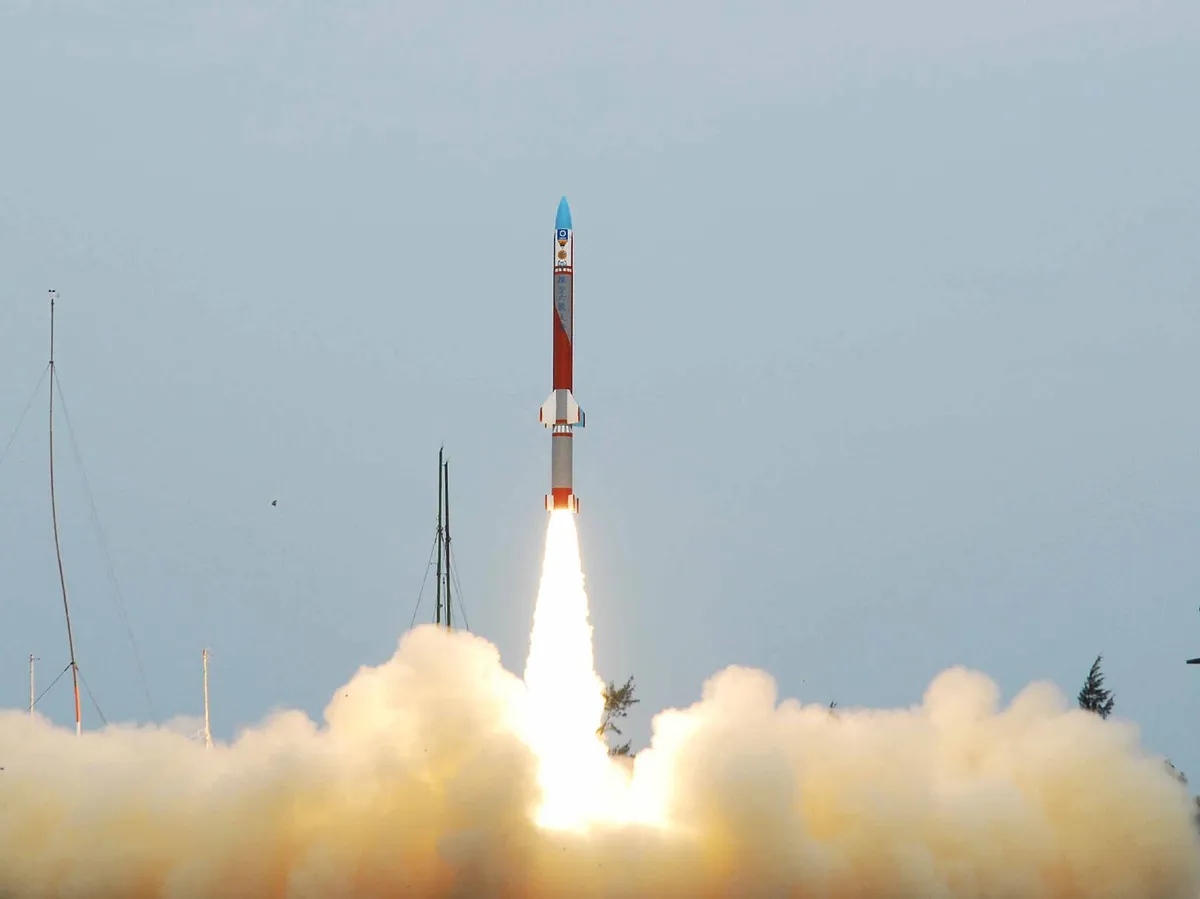
Taiwan Space Agency sounding rocket launch from Jiupeng in 2008

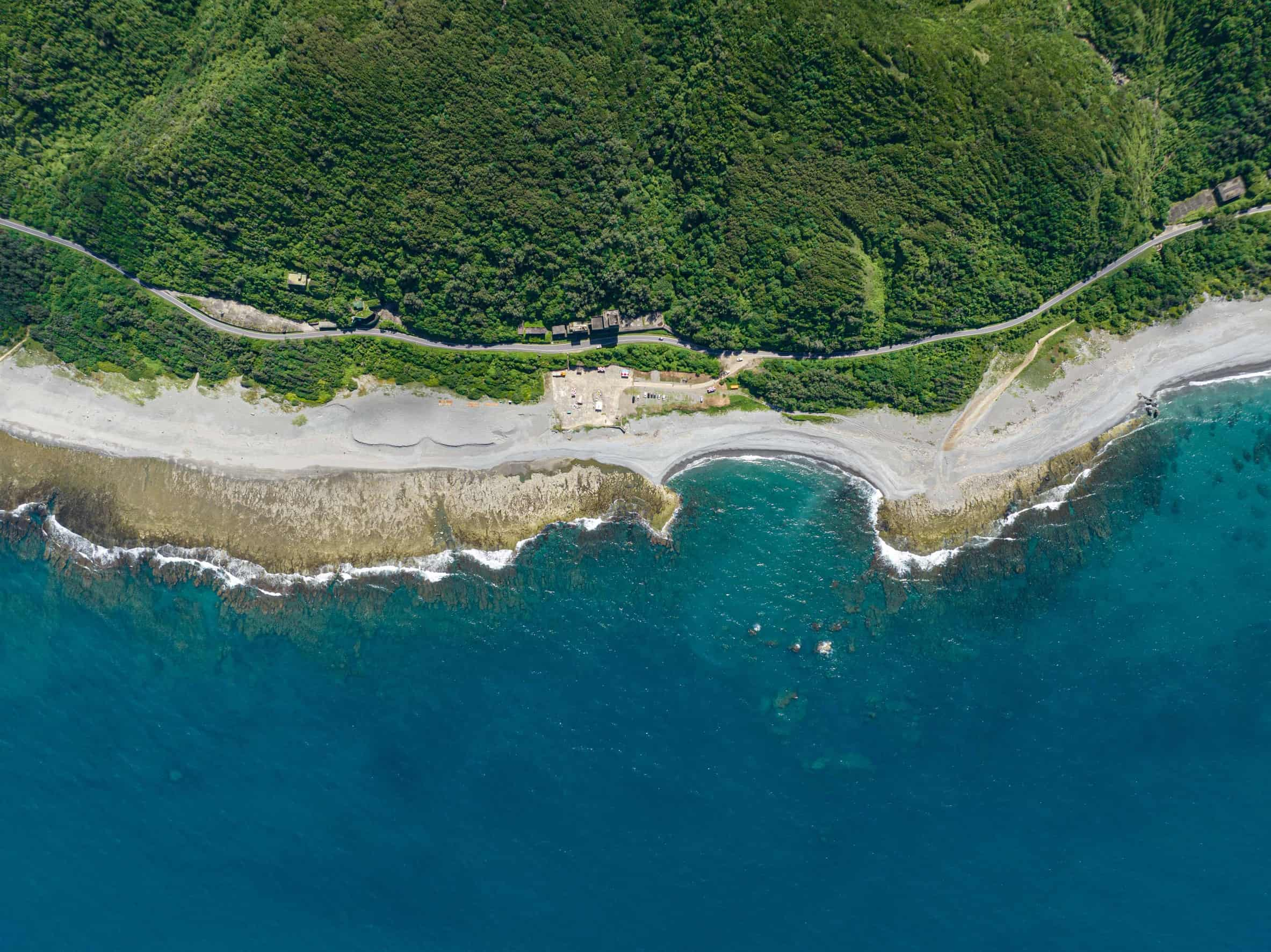
A coastal portion of the base along the coast including the future Hsu-hai Rocket Research Launch Site in 2022

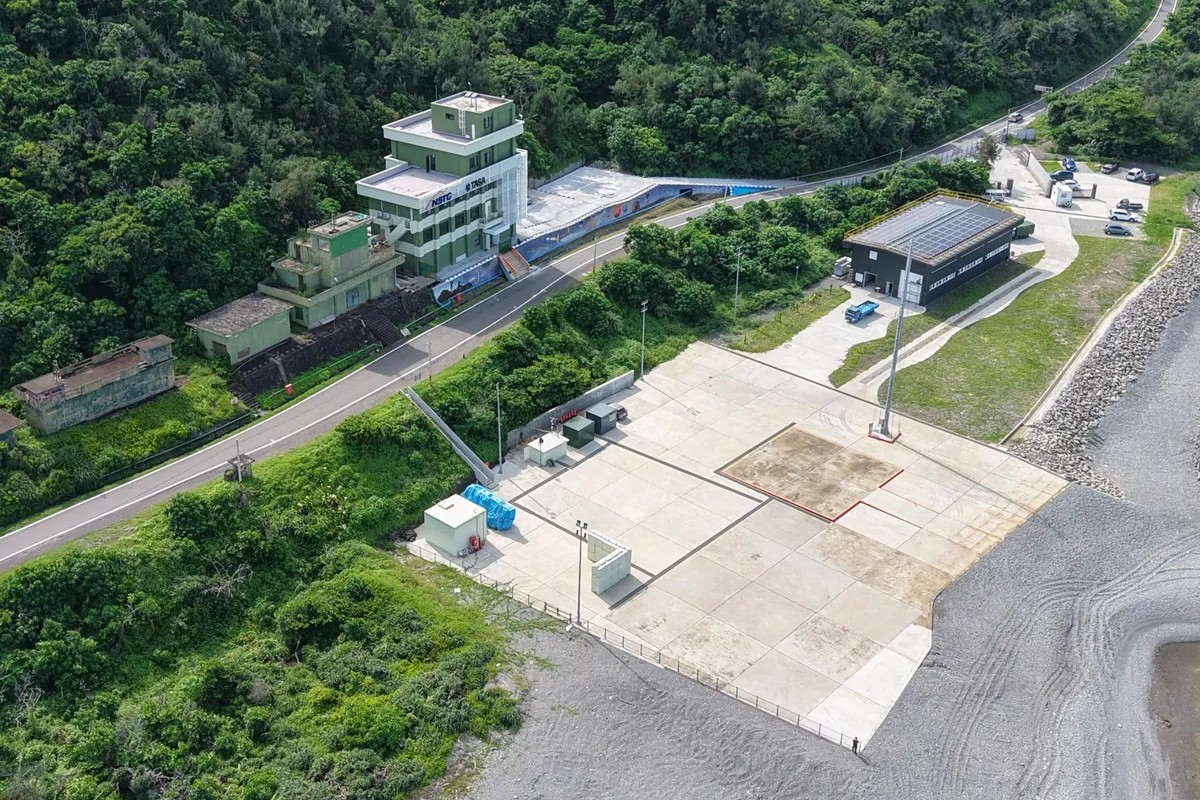
Overhead view of the Hsu-hai Rocket Research Launch Site in 2025

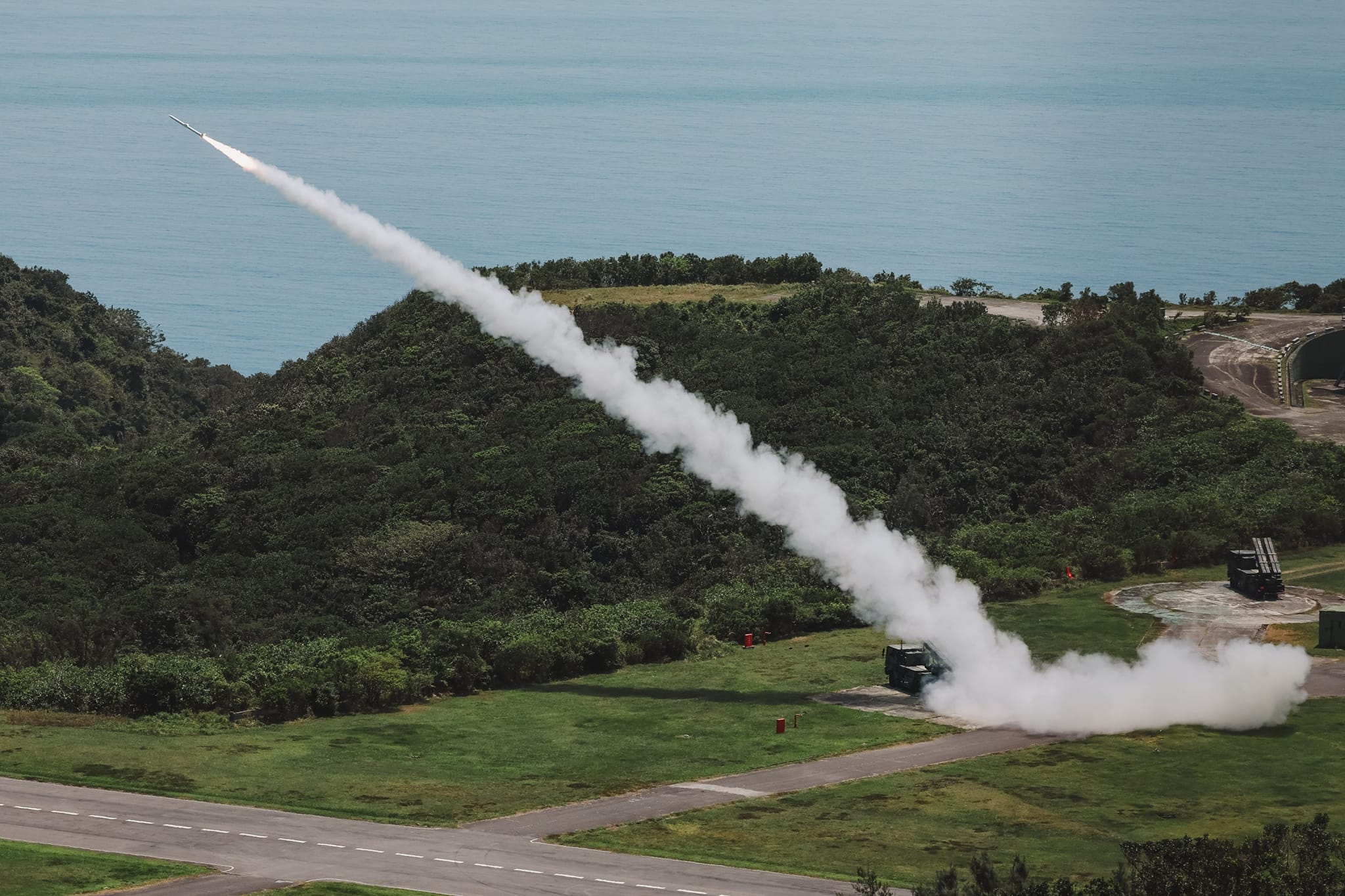
Land Sword 2 launch

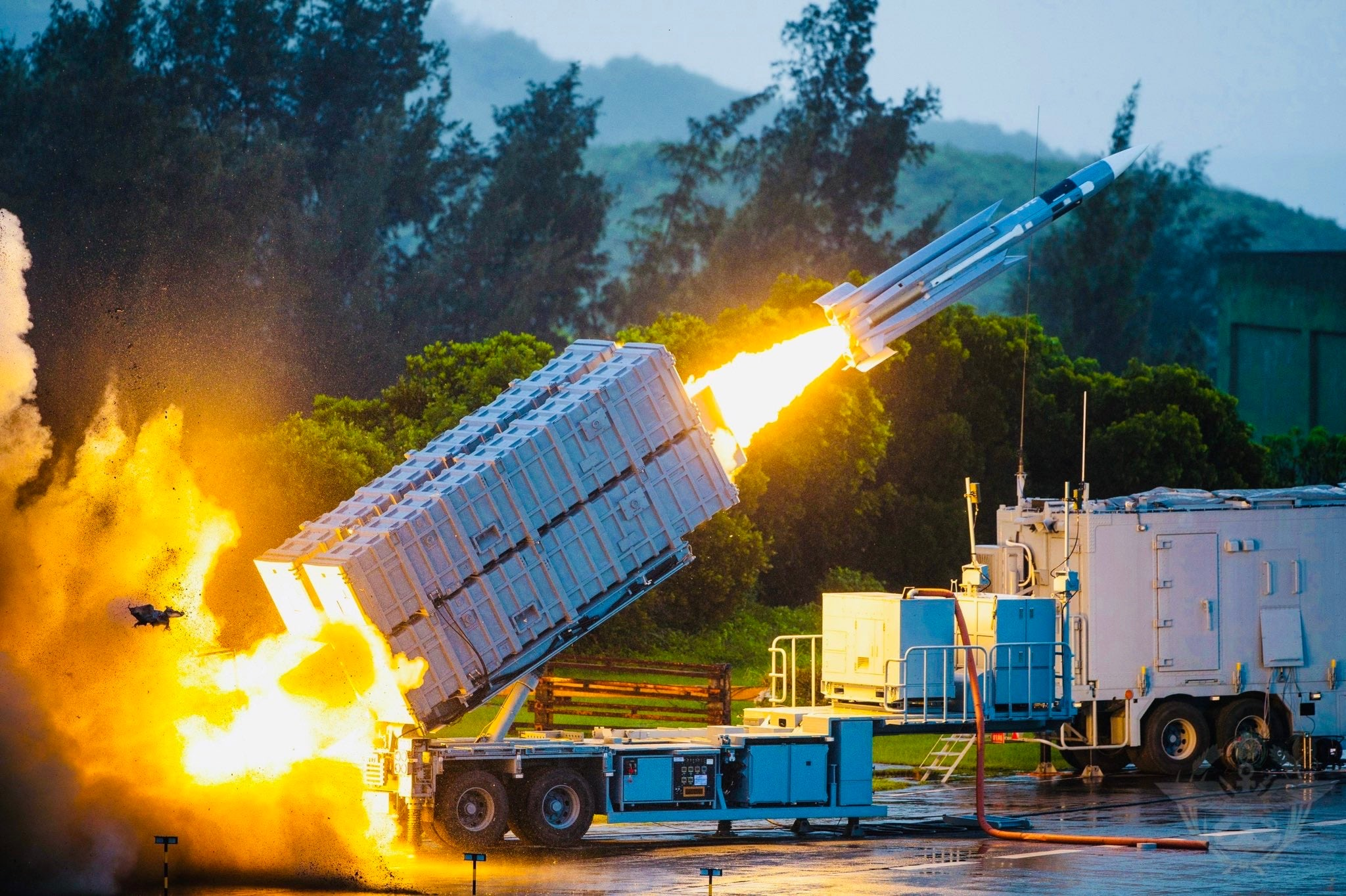
HF-3 launch

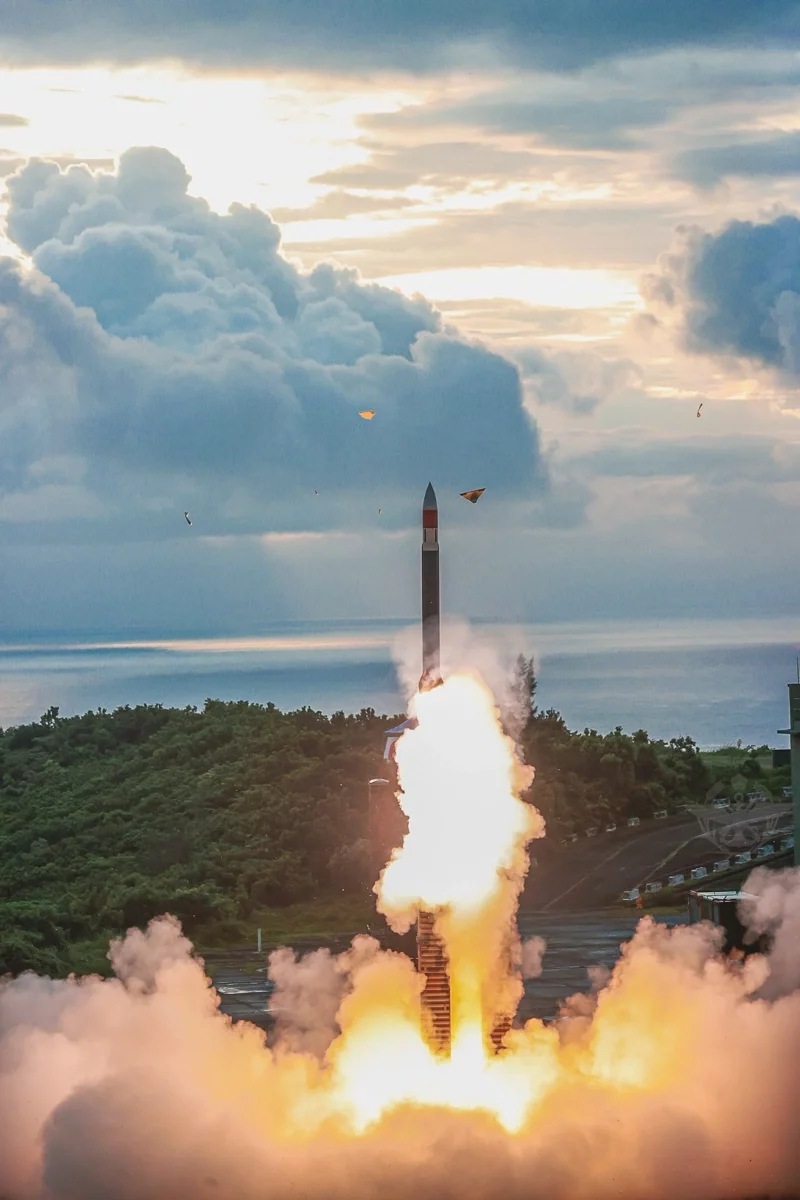
TK-3 (missile) launch

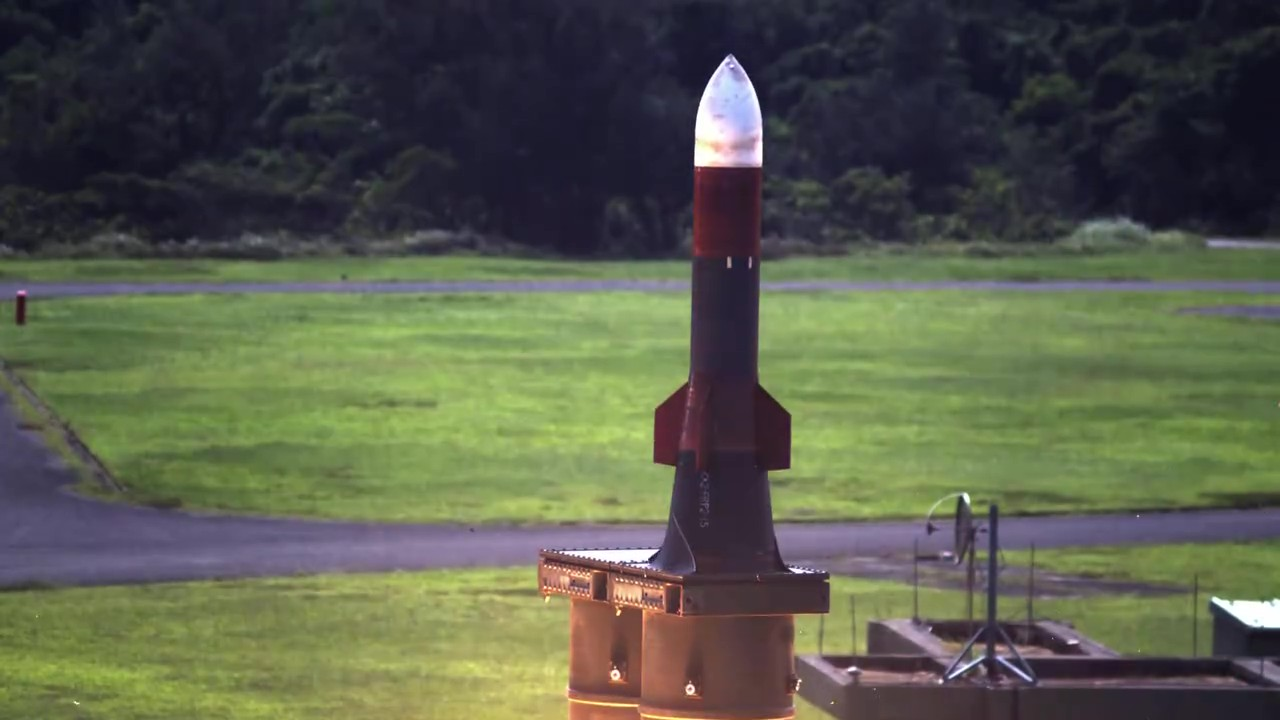
TK-4 launch

== See also ==
- Defense industry of Taiwan
- National Launch Site
