= Sky Bow IV =

Air defense system

Sky Bow IV / Tien Kung IV
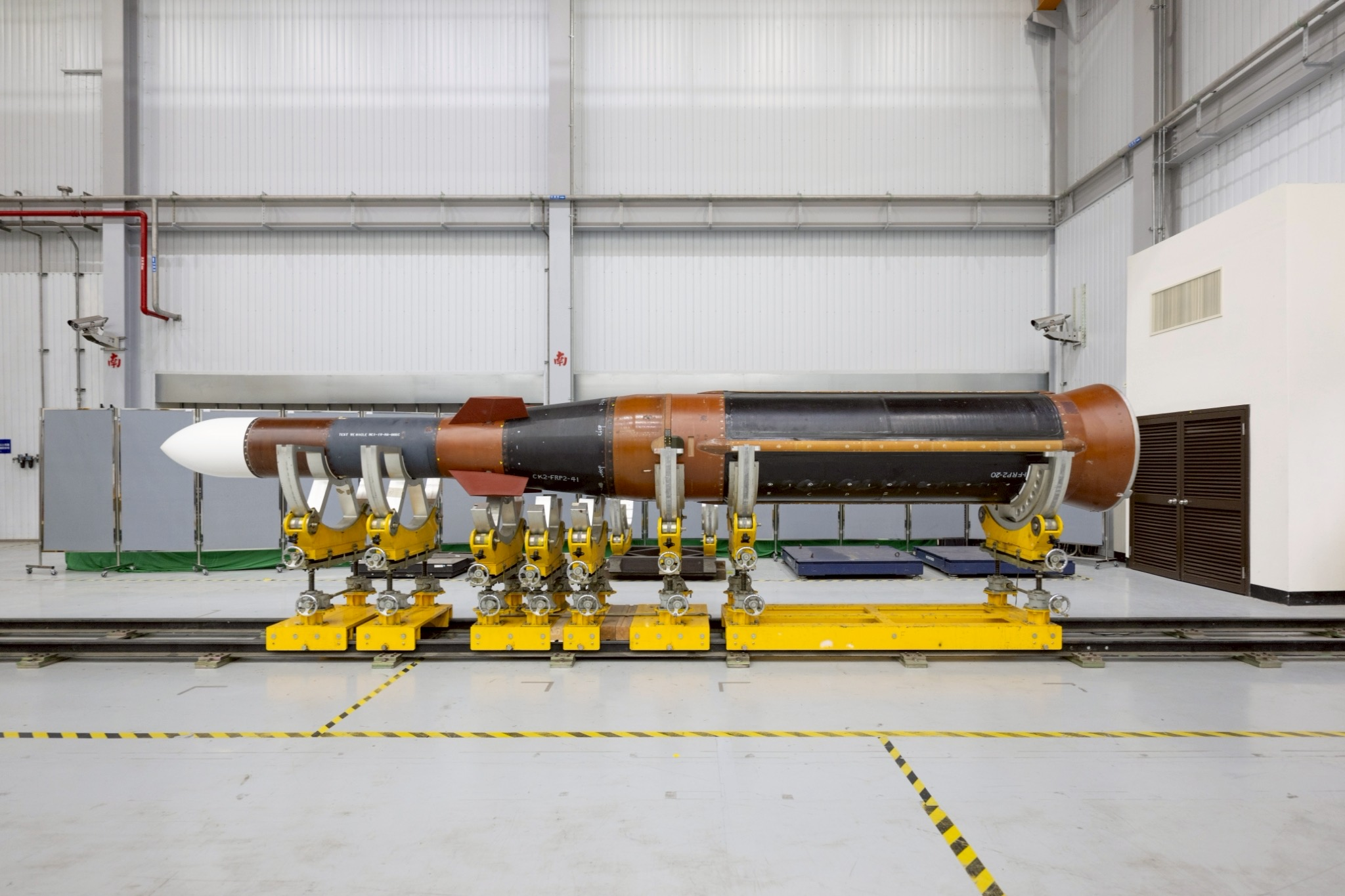
- Type: Air Defense; Anti-ballistic missile
- Place of origin: Taiwan

Production history
- Designer: NCSIST

Specifications
- Effective firing range: 500km
- Engine: Solid-propellant rocket
- Flight ceiling: 70-100km
- Maximum speed: Mach 10+
- Launch platform: TEL

Tien Kung IV, or Sky Bow IV, is an air defense system currently being designed and trialed by the National Chung-Shan Institute of Science and Technology (NCSIST) in Taiwan. Development codename is Strong Bow. Its canister is 7.61 meters long, longer than the 5.49 meter of the Sky Bow III system currently in service. Its ceiling and range are greater than the ones of Sky Bow and MIM-104 Patriot.

== Sky Bow IV/Strong Bow I ==
In 2023 development work on a new BMD missile, dubbed Strong Bow, with a maximum interception altitude of 70km was completed. While often reported as an extended range variant of the TK-3, the Strong Bow is a distinct missile. Differences from the TK-3 include the fuselage, nosecone, and propulsion system. It also has a domestically produced microwave power amplifier and a K_{a} band seeker.

The Strong Bow I was made public at the 2023 Taipei Aerospace & Defense Technology Exhibition (TADTE) but was not displayed. A Strong Bow I system was displayed at the 2025 TADTE. The system includes a large mobile radar. A single Strong Bow I launcher carries four missiles.

Testing of the system was completed in May 2025.

== Strong Bow II ==
A longer ranged derivative of the Strong Bow I with an intercept altitude of 100km or more is in development. Two variants exist, IIA which is an anti-ballistic missile and IIB which is a surface-to-surface ballistic missile with a range of 1,500 km.

== Gallery ==
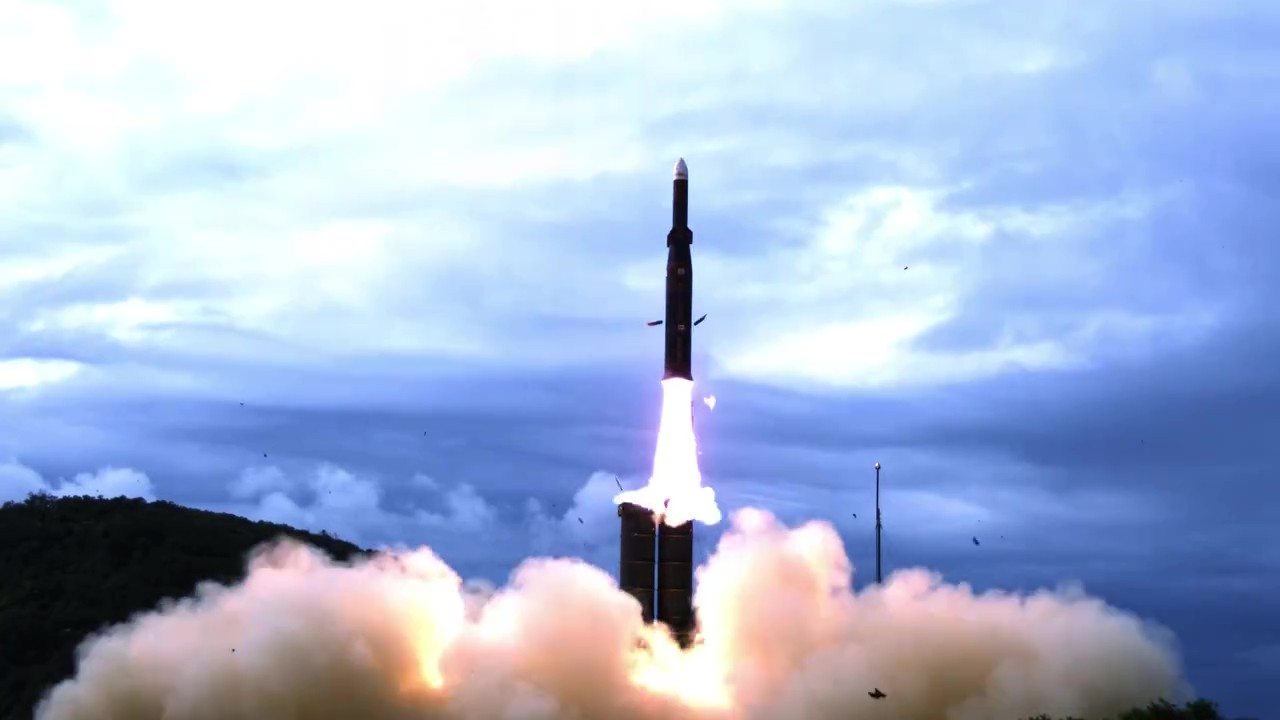
TK-4 during testing at Jiupeng Military Base

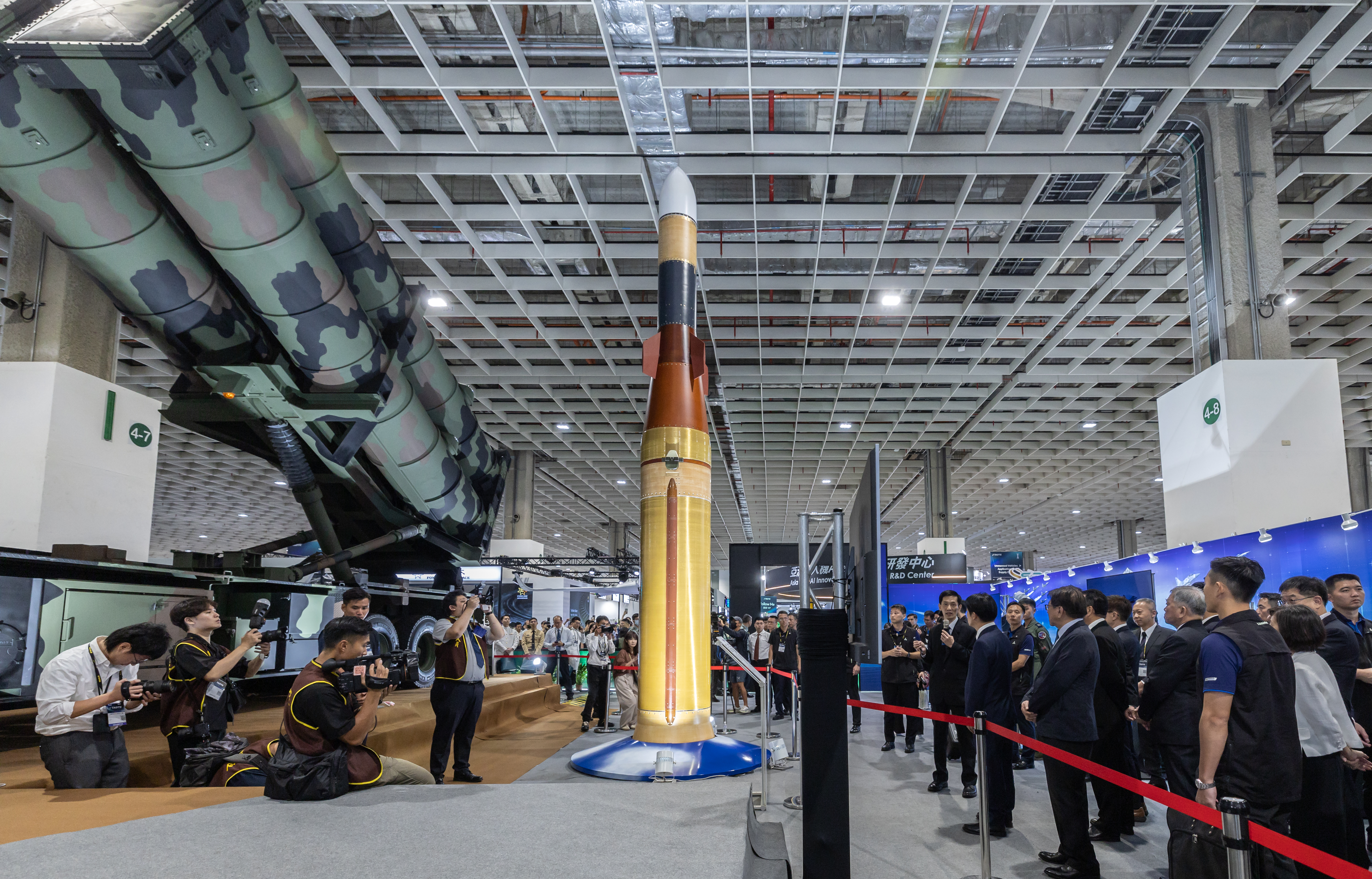
Missile display

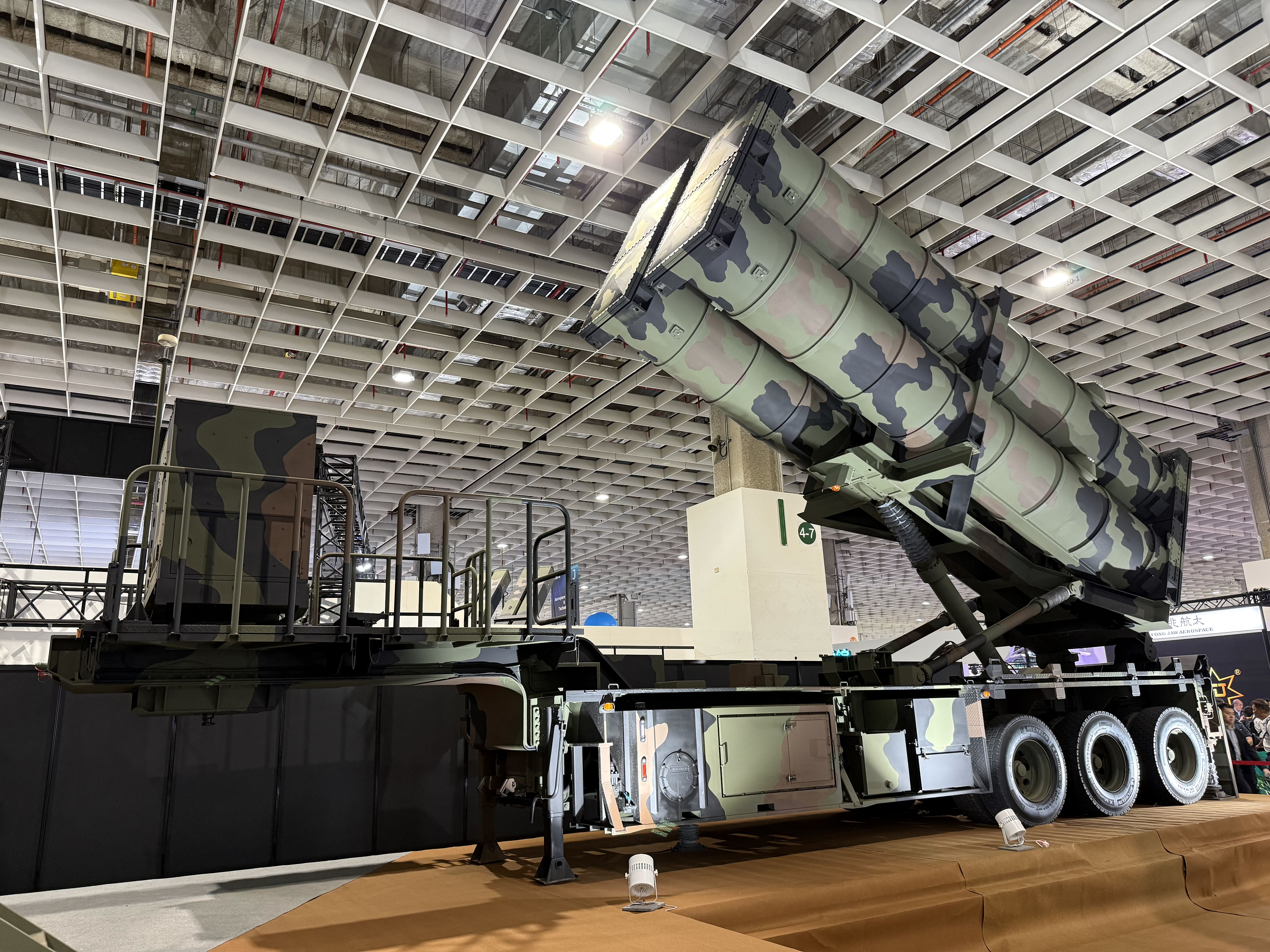
TK-4 launcher trailer

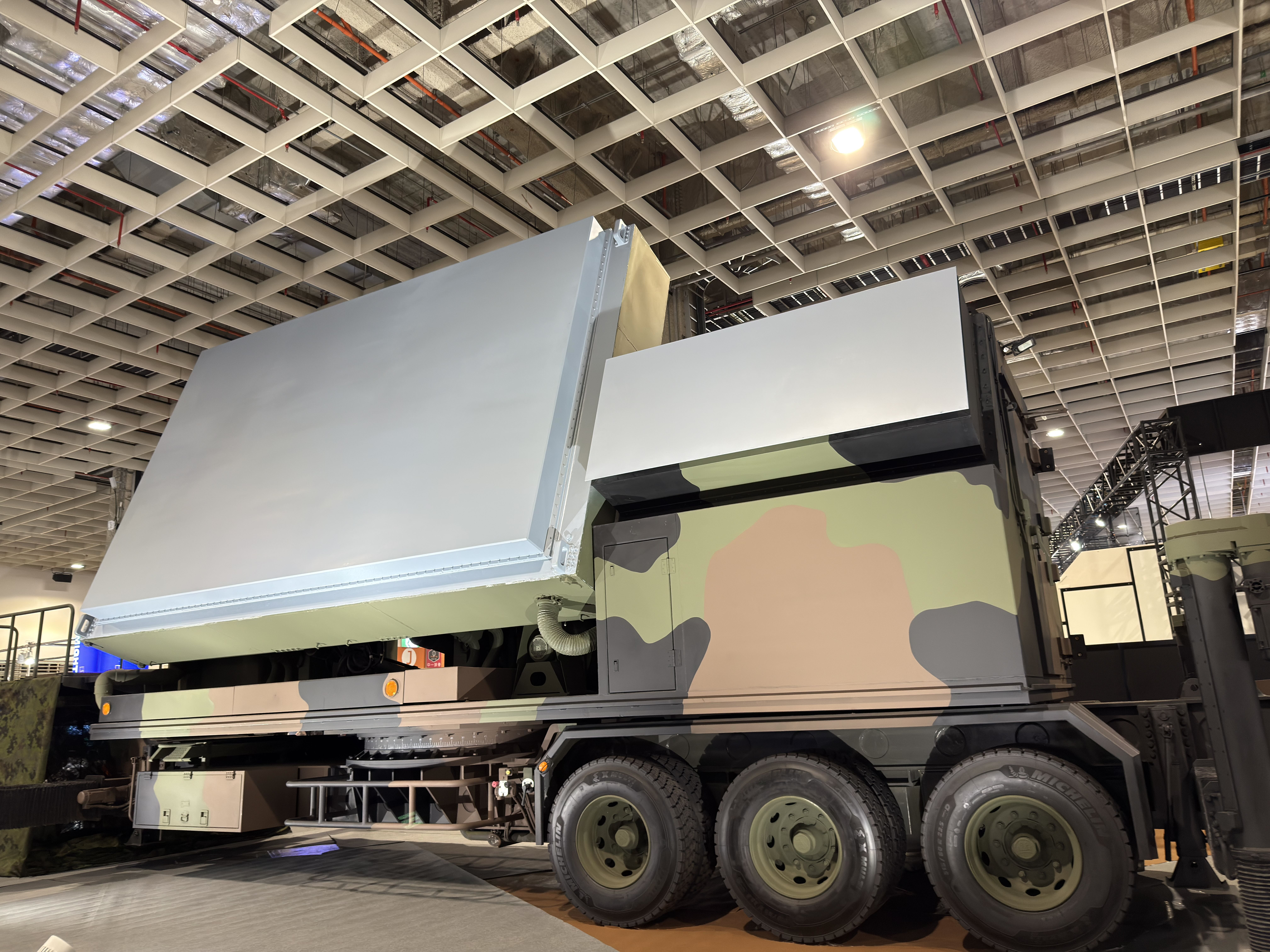
TK-4 radar front

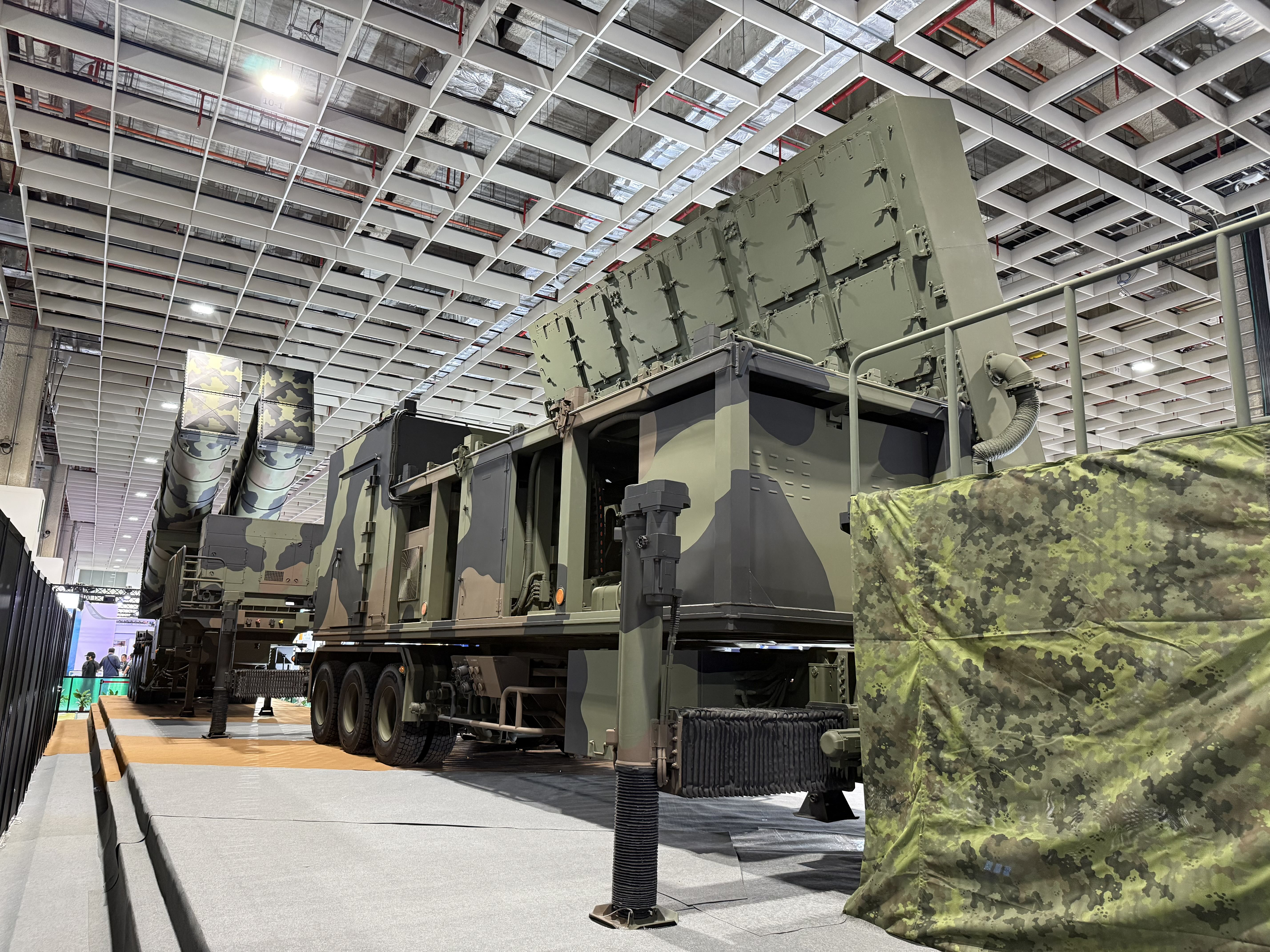
TK-4 radar back

== See also ==
- Sky Spear
- Terminal High Altitude Area Defense
- Anti-aircraft warfare
- Comparison of anti-ballistic missile systems
- Anti-ballistic missile
- List of equipment of the Republic of China Air Force
