= Sky Sword =

Sky Sword may refer to:

- Sky Sword I, a short range Taiwanese anti-air missile
- Sky Sword II, a medium range Taiwanese anti-air missile
