= Taipei Aerospace & Defense Technology Exhibition =

Biennial defense exhibition in Taiwan

Taipei Aerospace & Defense Technology Exhibition 台北國際航太暨國防工業展
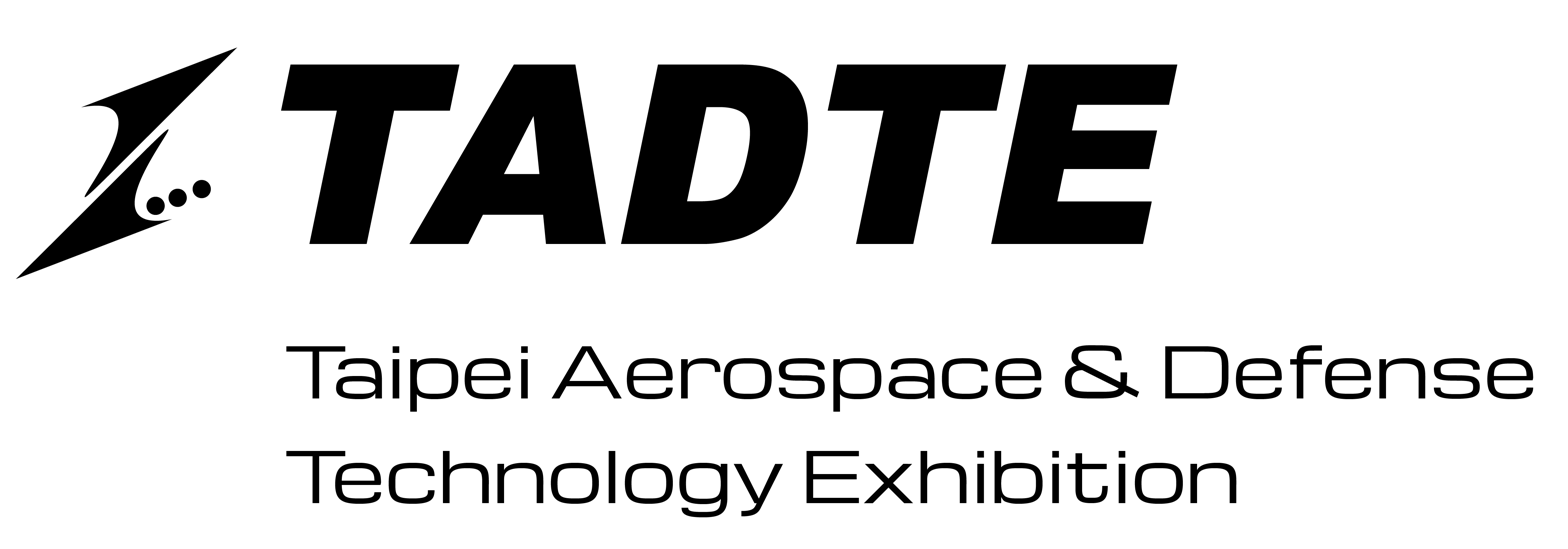
- Nickname: TADTE
- Status: Active
- Genre: Trade Show
- Dates: September
- Frequency: Biennial: Odd years
- Venue: Taipei Nangang Exhibition Center
- Country: Taiwan
- Most recent: 2025
- Next event: 2027
- Attendance: 34,000+
- Organiser: Taiwan External Trade Development Council
- Website: https://www.tadte.com.tw/en

The Taipei Aerospace & Defense Technology Exhibition (TADTE; Chinese: 台北國際航太暨國防工業展) is a biennial defense exhibition held in Taiwan.

TADTE is organized by the Taiwan External Trade Development Council (TAITRA). It is held biennially. Repeat exhibitors include both local firms such as, Lungteh Shipbuilding, foreign companies such as Lockheed Martin, and military concerns such as National Chung-Shan Institute of Science and Technology and the Armaments Bureau arsenals (primarily the 202, 205 and 209). It is generally a three day event.

== History ==
=== 2009, 10th ===
- Date: Aug. 13-16
- Exhibitors: 97
- Booths: 681

=== 2011, 11th ===
- Date: Aug. 15 - 18
- Exhibitors: 91
- Booths: 690

=== 2013, 12th ===
- Date: Aug. 13 - 16
- Exhibitors: 103
- Booths: 688
- From 2013-2015 the Exhibition experienced a 27% increase in the number of exhibitors.

=== 2015, 13th ===
- Date: Aug. 13 - 16
- Exhibitors: 126
- Booths: 694

=== 2017, 14th ===
- Date: Aug. 17 - 19
- Exhibitors: 141
- Booths: 761

=== 2019, 15th ===
- Date: Aug. 15 - 17
- Exhibitors: 159
- Booths: 794
- The 2019 Exhibition featured an enclosed UAV Test Flight area for product demonstrations. The US Government approved export licenses to allow advanced American technology to be exhibited during the 2019 show.

=== 2023, 16th ===
- Date: Sep. 14 - 16
- Exhibitors: 275
- Booths: 968
- Slogan: Show Off Your ARMS
- Changes from last edition:
  - Relocate show ground from Taipei World Trade Center to Taipei Nangang Exhibition Center
  - American Institute in Taiwan first time organized exhibitors delegation to the show
Photos from TADTE 2023
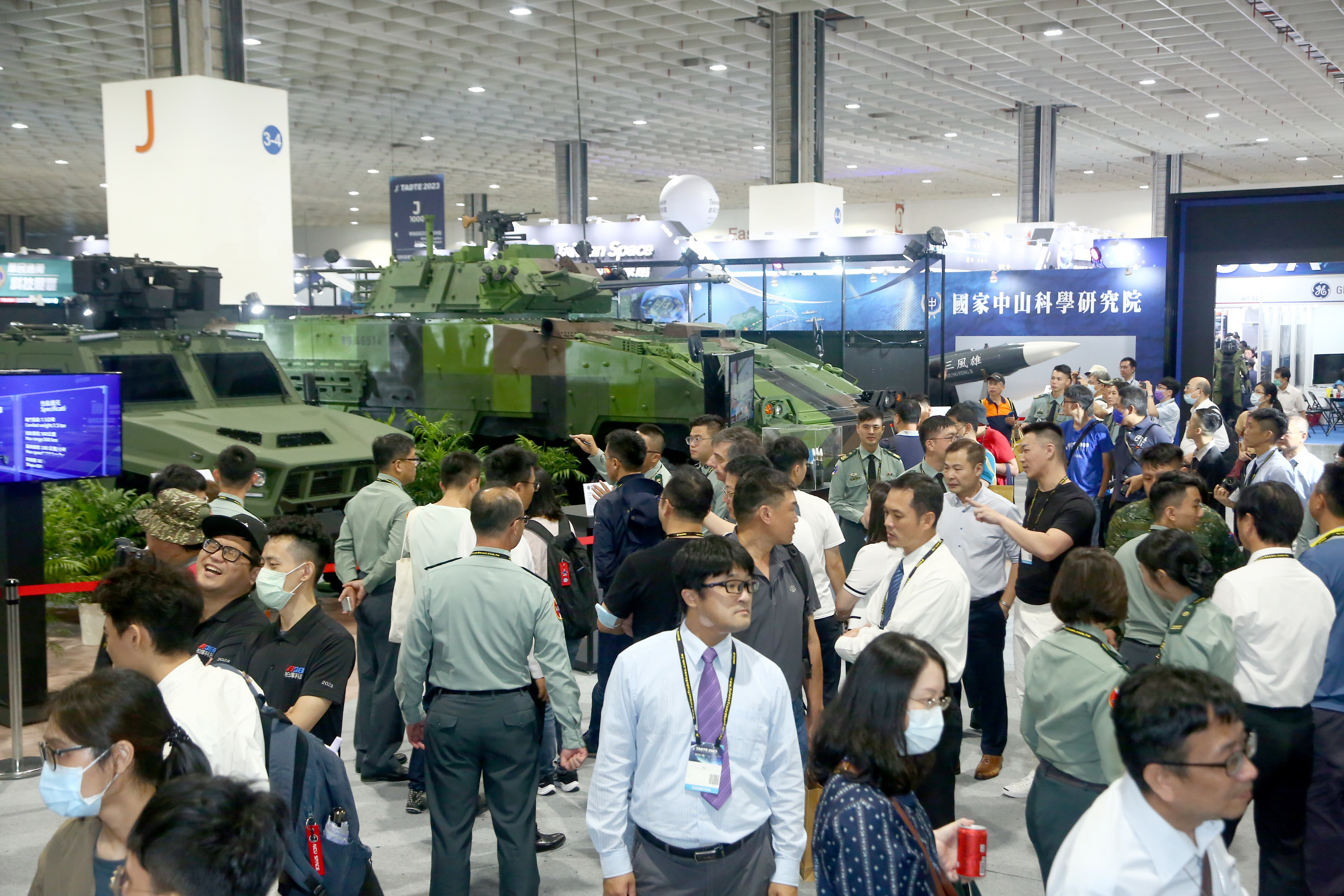
MND Pavilion

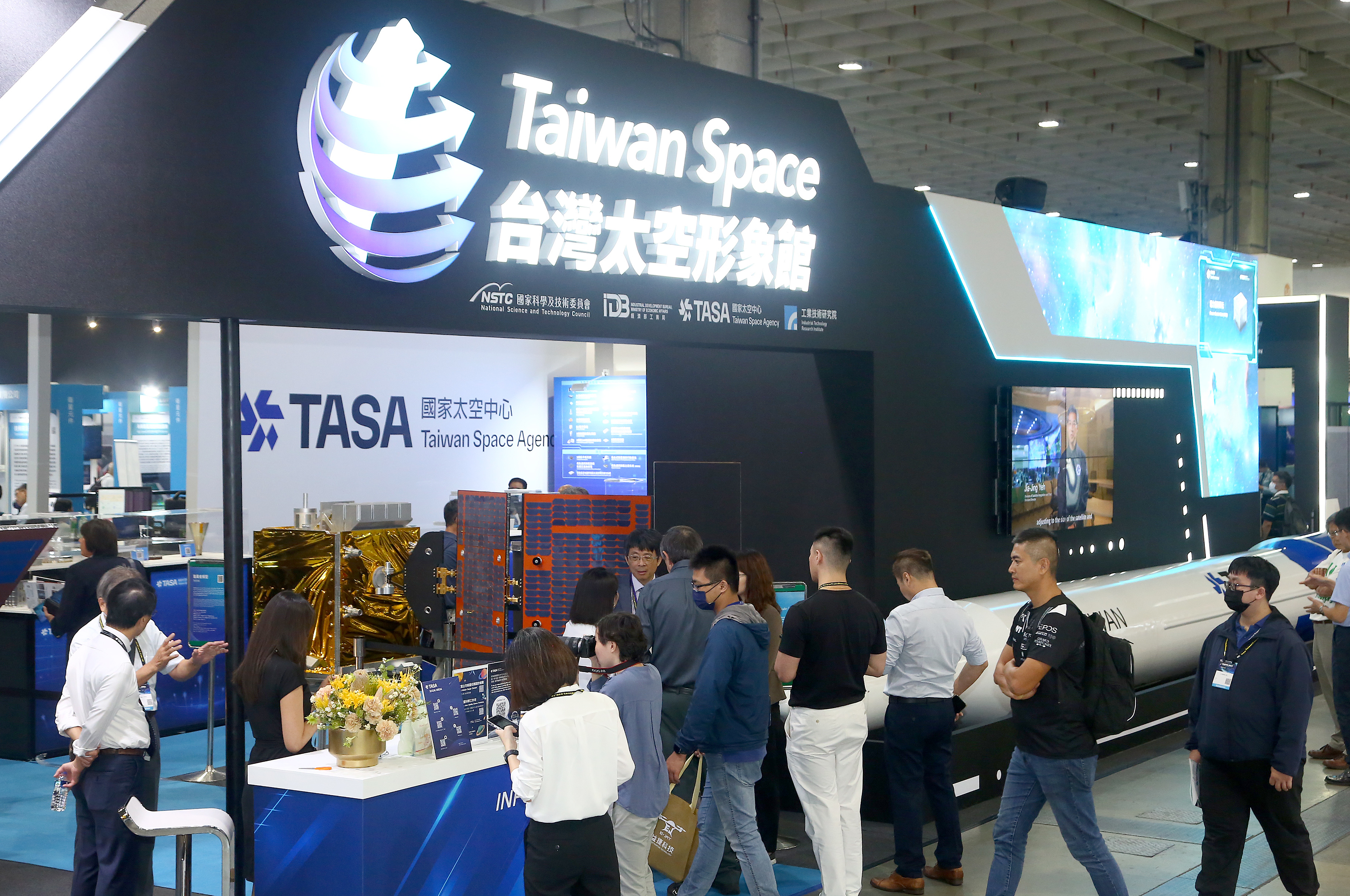
Taiwan Space Paviliion

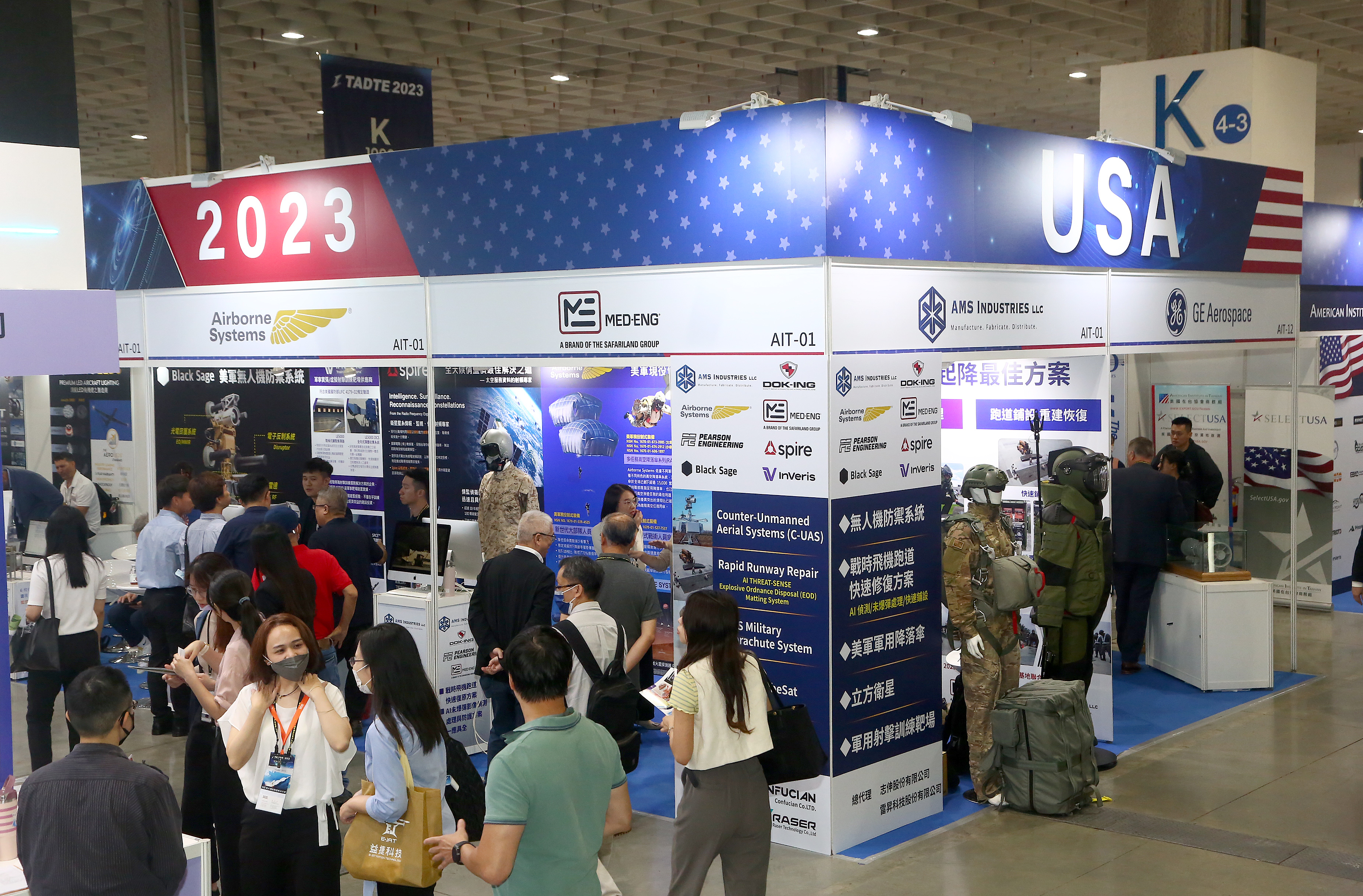
USA Pavilion

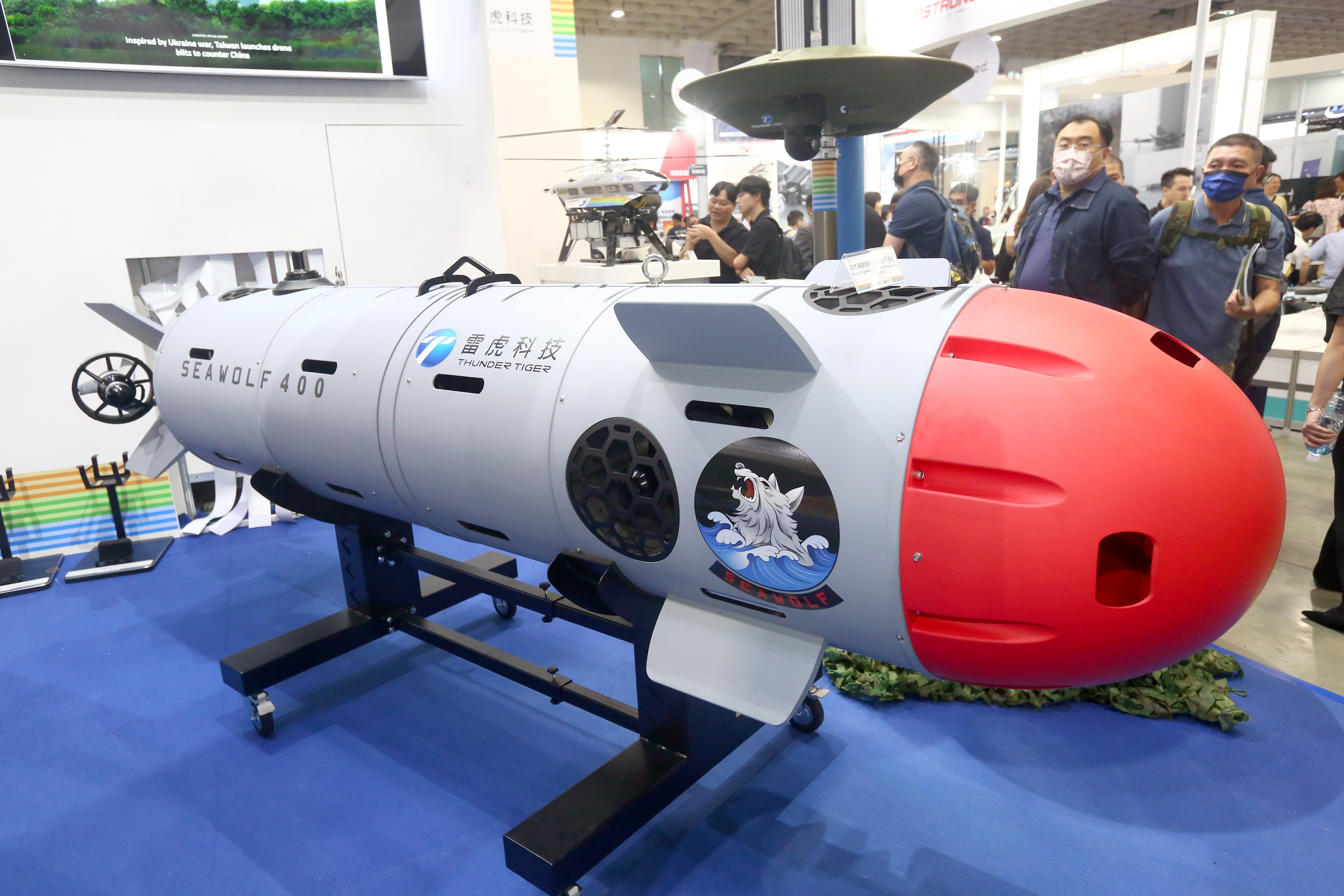
Thunder Tiger Seawolf 400

=== 2025, 17th ===
- Date: Sep. 18 - 20
- Slogan: Future Defense, Boundless Innovation
- Theme: Advanced Defense, Green Aviation, Resilient Supply Chain, Unmanned Evolution

A number of Indian space and intelligence startups exhibited at TADTE for the first time in 2025. A Strong Bow I system was displayed for the first time at the 2025 TADTE.

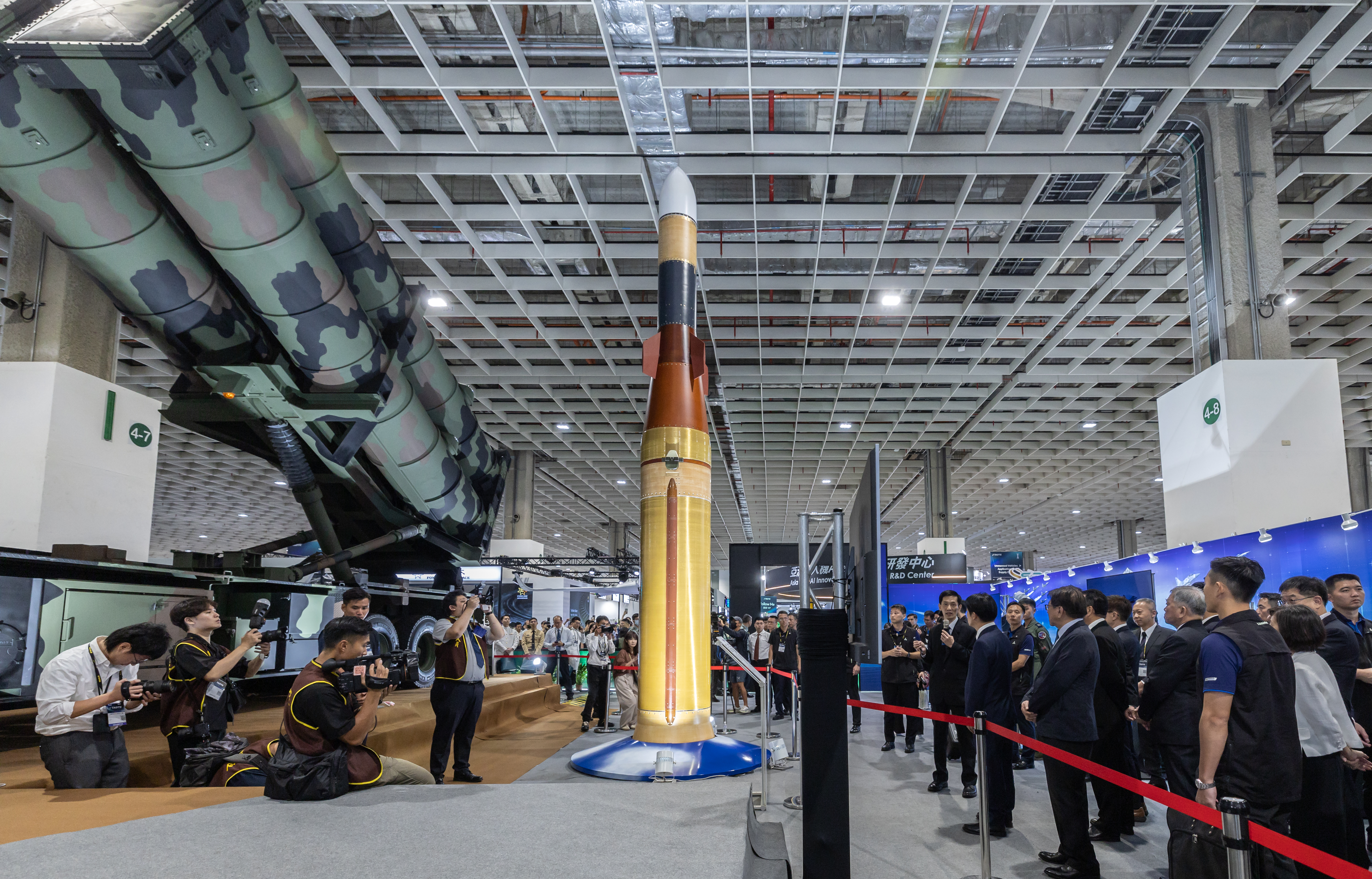
TK-4 system on display

== See also ==
- Africa Aerospace and Defence Expo
- Eurosatory
- Egypt Defence Expo
- International Defence Exhibition
- International Defence Industry Exhibition
- International Defence Exhibition and Seminar
- Defense industry of Taiwan
