= Hsiung Feng =

Hsiung Feng ("Brave Wind") may refer to various missiles developed by the Chungshan Institute of Science and Technology in Taiwan:

- Hsiung Feng I (HF-1), an anti-ship missile system developed between 1975 and 1978
- Hsiung Feng II (HF-2), an anti-ship missile system with several versions in service
- Hsiung Feng IIE (HF-2E), an advanced surface-to-surface cruise missile system
- Hsiung Feng III (HF-3), the third generation Hsiung Feng series of anti-ship missiles
