= ROCS Cheng Kung =

Cheng Kung-class frigates

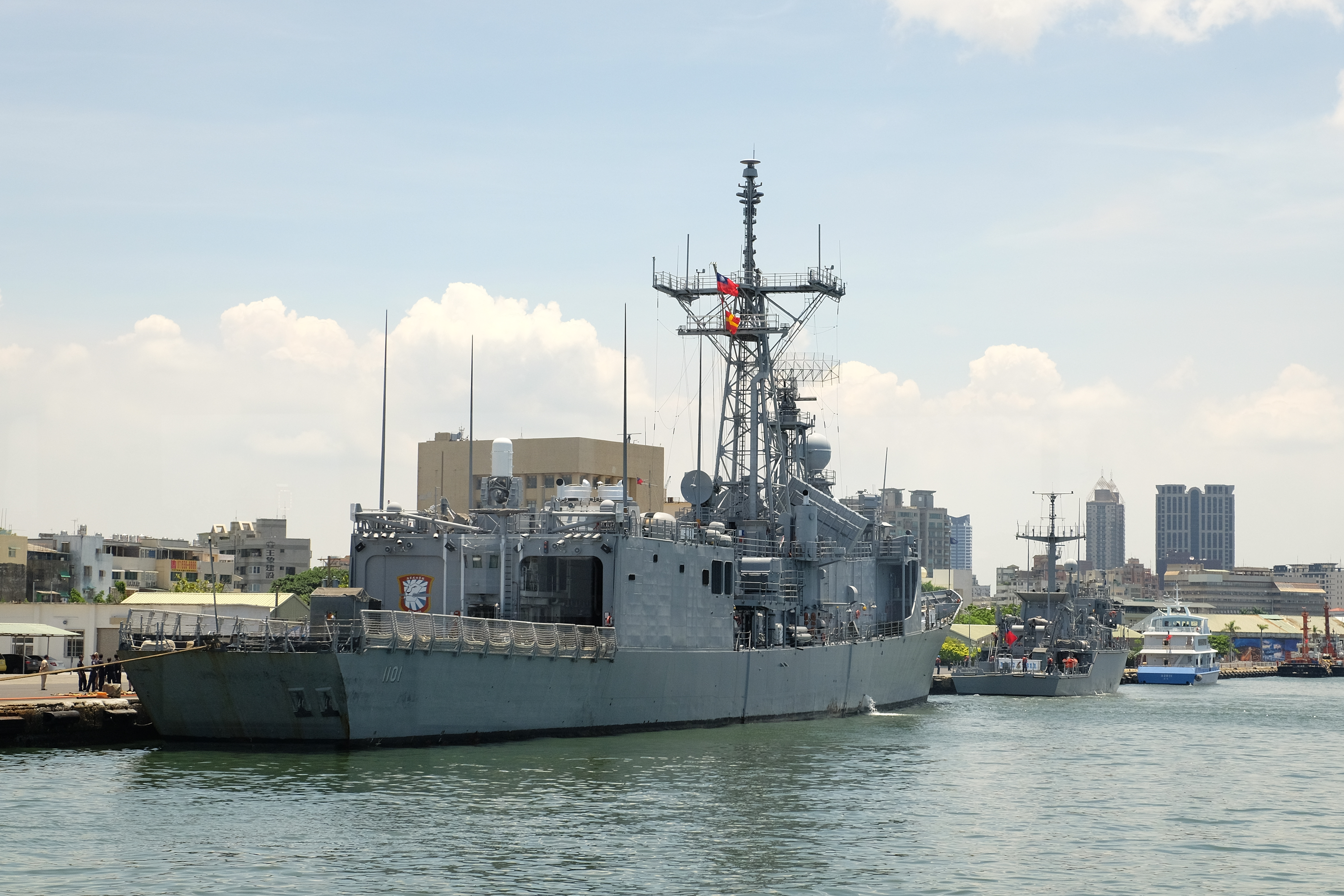
- ROCS Cheng Kung on 12 June 2015

History

Taiwan
- Name: Cheng Kung; (鄭成功)
- Namesake: Cheng Ch'eng-kung
- Ordered: 8 May 1989
- Builder: China Shipbuilding Corp., Kaohsiung
- Laid down: 21 December 1990
- Launched: 5 October 1991
- Commissioned: 7 May 1993
- Identification: Pennant number: PFG2-1101
- Status: in active service

General characteristics
- Class & type: Cheng Kung-class frigate
- Displacement: 4,103 long tons (4,169 t) full
- Length: 453 ft (138 m)
- Beam: 46.95 ft (14.31 m)
- Propulsion: General Electric LM2500-30 gas turbines, 40,000 shp total
- Speed: 29 knots
- Complement: 18 officers; 180 enlisted; 19 flight crew
- Sensors & processing systems: AN/SPS-49 air-search radar; AN/SPS-55 surface-search radar; CAS, STIR gun fire control radar; SQS-56 sonar
- Electronic warfare & decoys: AN/SLQ-32(V)5; (AN/SLQ-32(V)2 + SIDEKICK)
- Armament: 40 × SM-1MR at Mk 13 Missile Launcher; 4 × Hsiung Feng II and 4 HF-3 supersonic AShM; 1 × OTO Melara 76 mm naval gun; 2 × Bofors 40mm/L70mm guns; 1 × 20 mm Phalanx CIWS; 2 × triple Mark 32 ASW torpedo tubes with Mark 46 anti-submarine torpedoes
- Aircraft carried: Sikorsky S-70C-1/2
- Aviation facilities: Hangar and helipad

ROCS Cheng Kung (成功, PFG2-1101) is the lead ship of eight Cheng Kung-class guided-missile frigates, which are based on the Oliver Hazard Perry class of the United States Navy.

== Construction and career ==
Laid down on 2 December 1990 and launched on 27 October 1991, Cheng Kung was commissioned in service on 7 May 1993. All of these Taiwanese guided missile frigates have the length of the later long hull Oliver Hazard Perry-class vessels, but have a different weapon and electronics fit.

In order to control the different weapon systems on board that the Mk 92 cannot integrate into, a second CDS, H930 MCS was installed on all eight ships in order to control the eight HF-2 (or four HF-2 and four HF-3 on PFG-1101 and PFG-1105) and the two Bofors 40 mm/L70 guns (except on PFG-1110). The rest of the ships in this class will receive four HF-3 upon their major overhaul.

== Gallery ==
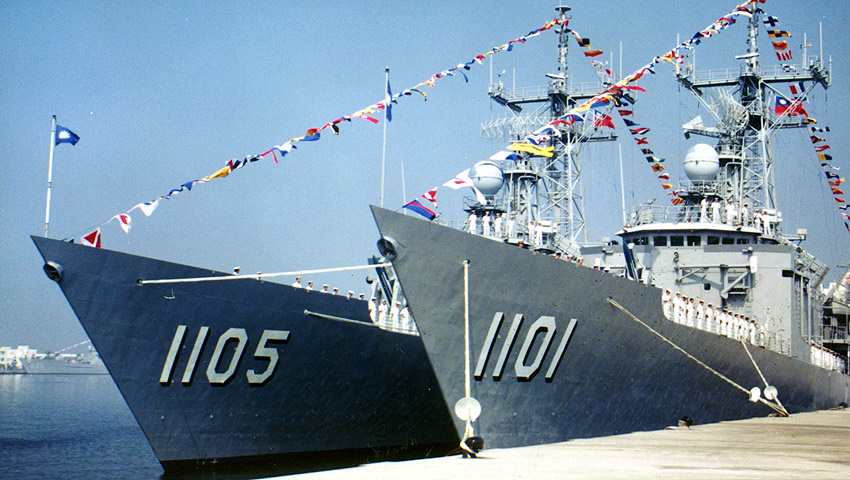
ROCS Cheng Kung and ROCS Chi Kuang

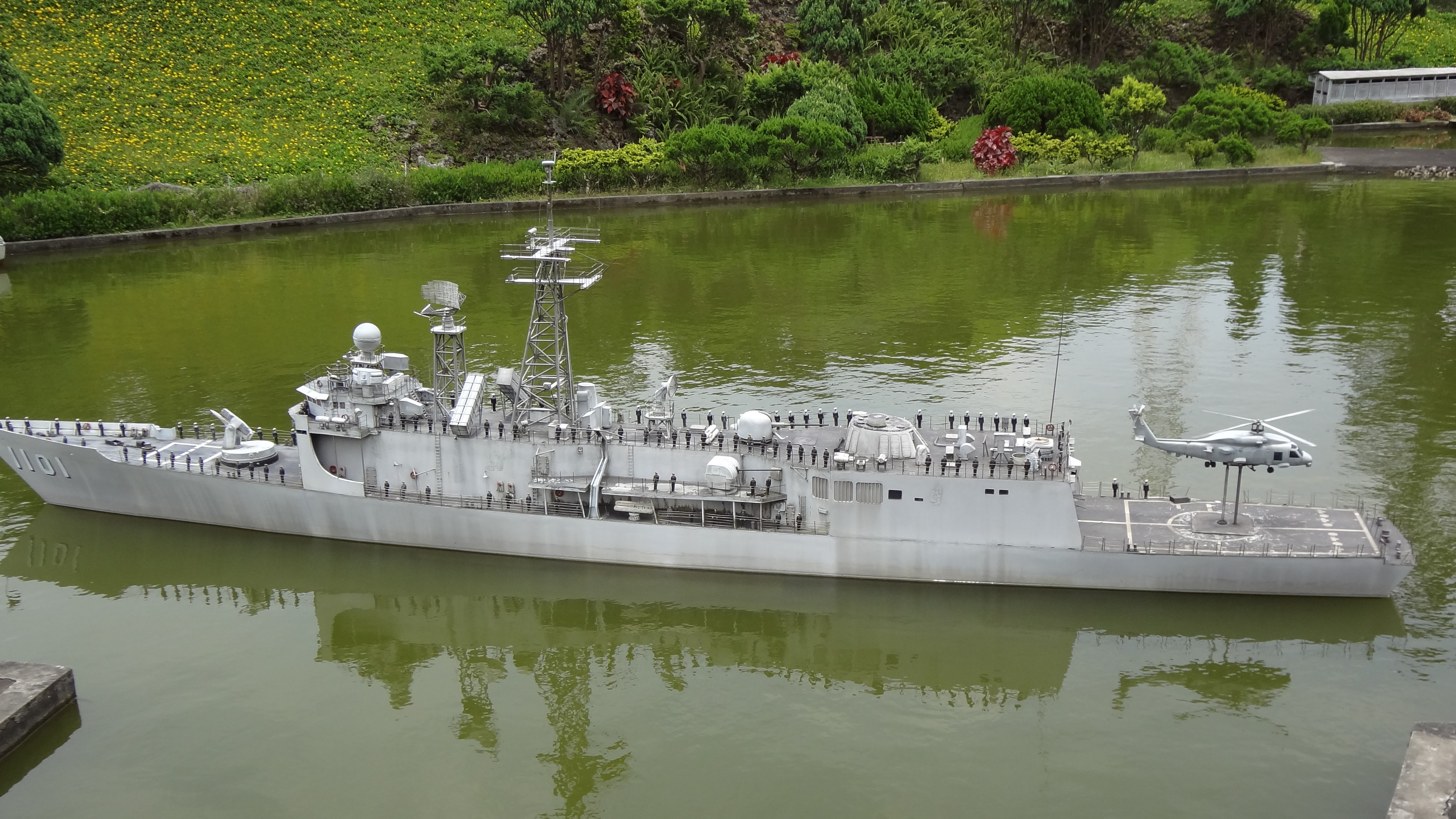
A model of ROCS Cheng Kung
