= HF-1 =

HF-1 may refer to:

- Hsiung Feng I, Taiwanese anti ship missile
- HF-1, German strike drone
