= Hsiung Feng IIE =

Taiwanese land-attack cruise missile

- Type: Land-attack cruise missile
- Place of origin: Taiwan

Service history
- In service: 2011 – present
- Used by: Republic of China (Taiwan) Armed Forces

Production history
- Manufacturer: National Chung-Shan Institute of Science and Technology
- Unit cost: ~3m USD (2003)
- Produced: ~300 (2012), in production

Specifications
- Mass: 1,600 kg (3,500 lb)
- Length: 600 cm (236 in)
- Diameter: 510 mm (20 in)
- Warhead: 220 kg (490 lb)
- Engine: turbofan with solid rocket booster
- Operational range: Various reported ranges from 600 km to >2,000km >1200 km for Hsiung Sheng
- Maximum speed: (Mach 0.75 - 0.85) 919–1,041 km/h (571–647 mph)
- Guidance system: GPS, TERCOM, and inertial guidance with automatic target recognition for terminal guidance
- Accuracy: 10 to 15 m

The Hsiung Feng IIE (HF-2E; Chinese: 雄風二E巡弋飛彈; lit. 'Brave Wind IIE Cruise Missile') is a surface-to-surface land-attack cruise missile system developed by the National Chung-Shan Institute of Science and Technology (NCSIST) in Taiwan.

== Development ==
According to the Taiwan Defense Review (TDR), the HF-2E land attack cruise missile is not a derivative of the Hsiung Feng 2 HF-2 anti-ship missile, as it is often incorrectly reported. The use of the "HF-2E" designation is the primary cause of this confusion and was intentional misinformation in order to divert attention away from the true nature of the project, which is that of a long range offensive cruise missile. The HF-2E is actually a completely different design and is said to serve a similar function in Taiwan's military as the US Navy's Tomahawk cruise missile. Its launch weight is reported to be in the 3,300–3,500 lb (1,500–1,600 kg) range, including its solid rocket booster. It is essentially a tactical land attack cruise missile designed for use against military target sets, particularly air-defense fire units and command-and-control facilities, and its relatively small warhead size and the rather limited number of missiles planned for procurement clearly suggest that this is not a "first strike" weapon.

The project was first announced in 2001. Following several test firings in 2004 and early 2005 at the Jiu Peng Missile Range in southeastern Taiwan, the baseline HF-2E (Block I) completed its operational evaluation (OPEVAL) in 2005, the missile flying a low-altitude circuit off Taiwan's southeastern coastline between Pingtung and Lanyu Island. An improved HF-2E missile was reportedly tested by CSIST at Jui Peng Missile Range on 2 February 2007. In 2017 the missiles received an extensive upgrade to increase their effectiveness against naval targets.

== Description ==
The baseline HF-2E Block I land attack cruise missile (LACM) is said to be powered by an indigenously-developed Taiwanese turbofan engine believed to be rated in the 800 lbf (3.6 kN) thrust range and developed by CSIST partially based on technology and experience from the Microturbo 078 turbojet engine used on Hsiung Feng 2 (HF-2) anti-ship cruise missiles. When equipped with a standard unitary high-explosive 1,000 lb (450 kg)-class warhead, it is said to have a maximum range of 700 km. Other types of warhead are said to be in development, such as cluster submunitions and a hard target penetrator warhead. TDR also reported that through modification of the existing engine and combined with the redesign and reduction of the missile's control and electronic systems, CSIST was able to free up enough internal space/weight in the missile to allow it to carry additional fuel and extend its range to over 2,000 km, although a Defense News report claimed the other version was only an 800 km range missile. The ultimate objective is to develop a missile that has an objective range of over 5,000 km (3,100 mi), using a technologically advanced Taiwanese power plant with superior fuel efficiency and mission endurance, and possibly a more advanced and lighter miniaturized warhead.

The HF-2E Block I missile uses inertial guidance with global positioning system (GPS) and TERCOM updates. For terminal guidance, it uses infrared homing (Imaging infrared) with an autonomous digital target recognition system. The IIR terminal seeker is used for target acquisition and to positively identify an optimal aim point. The target image is then compared against digitized files in the memory of the on-board guidance computer (DSMAC terminal guidance). The HF-2E block I missile's cruising speed is high subsonic, typically in the Mach 0.75 – Mach 0.85 (571–647 mph; 919–1,041 km/h) range. When the missile approaches hostile territory, it would descend to an altitude of about 15–30 m (49–98 ft). On its final approach to its target, the missile would climb up to avoid any physical barriers and to allow its IIR seeker to acquire the target and identify an optimal aim point before plunging down onto the designated impact point. The report in Taiwan Defense Review, credited the HF-2E block I missile with a pre-terminal accuracy of around 15 m.

The primary difference between the two main variants is the engine. The longer ranged variant has a turbofan engine. The shorter range variant was first tested in 2004 with the longer ranged variant following in 2007 however both were put into mass production.

== Production and fielding ==
The low-rate production of the Block I missile was to have started in July 2005 and using funds originally allocated for its R&D, at least five missiles were built. The unit cost per missile was estimated to be at US$3.08 million (2003 US$ dollar value). Another report made in 2006 claimed that three batteries comprising twenty-four mobile launchers and forty-eight missiles were in the final stages of testing and may be fielded within two years. The HF-2E began low volume production in the Project ChiChun (戟隼, jǐ zhǔn, lance hawk). A Taipei Times news report claimed that President Ma Ying Jeou ordered the production of 500 to 1000 HF-2E missiles in 2008. It was approved and cleared to enter full volume/serial production in 2011. It supposedly can deliver a 440 lb (200 kg) unitary warhead to a range of 600 km (370 mi). The Associated Press has reported a range of 1,500 km.

The HF-2E missile is primarily deployed operationally in ground-mobile launchers. The launcher vehicle carries the missiles in protective aluminum box launchers, with wings and control fins retracted, conceptually similar to the trailer-mounted mobile launchers for Tien Kung Sky Bow series surface-to-air missiles and HF-2 coastal defense missiles. The launchers are normally based in hardened shelters at military installations, with deployment to remote, pre-surveyed launch sites during alert situations. The SCMP has reported that the HF-IIE is closely watched by the PLA's Rocket Force.

In 2022 annual combined production of the HF-2E and Hsiung Sheng was 81 units, the two missiles share a production line.

In 2025 it was reported that the navy planned to upgrade the Kee Lung-class destroyers with HF-2E missiles.

== Hsiung Sheng ==
The improved variant has been designated the Hsiung Sheng (traditional Chinese: 雄昇; simplified Chinese: 雄升; pinyin: Xióng Shēng). It is designed to be able to strike critical targets in distant Chinese cities like Wuhan and Qingdao.

In January 2021 the ROCAF took delivery of the first batch of improved HF-2E missiles. The range is reported to be in excess of 1,200 km however the number of missiles deployed is confidential. The Hsiung Sheng carries either a unitary or fragmentation warhead. The unitary high explosive warhead is designed to target bunkers and command centers while the fragmentation warhead is designed to target airfields.

== General characteristics ==
- Primary Function: Land-attack cruise missile
- Power Plant: turbofan engine with solid rocket booster for sustained cruise flight
- Range: Alternately reported to be 600 km, 1,500 km, and 2,000 km.
- Top Speed: Mach 0.75 – Mach 0.85 (571–647 mph; 919–1,041 km/h)
- Guidance: Inertial navigation system and commercial GPS with in-flight waypoints and corrected by terrain contour matching and forward-looking imaging infrared (IIR) seeker with automatic target recognition for terminal guidance
- Launch Weight: 3,000–3,500 lb (1,400–1,600 kg) including solid rocket booster
- Accuracy: Within 10 m
- Warhead: 200 kg (440 lb)
- Date deployed: Unknown

== See also ==
- Hsiung Feng I
- Hsiung Feng III
- Yun Feng
