= Han Kuang-wei =

Taiwanese military officer and engineer (1930–2019)

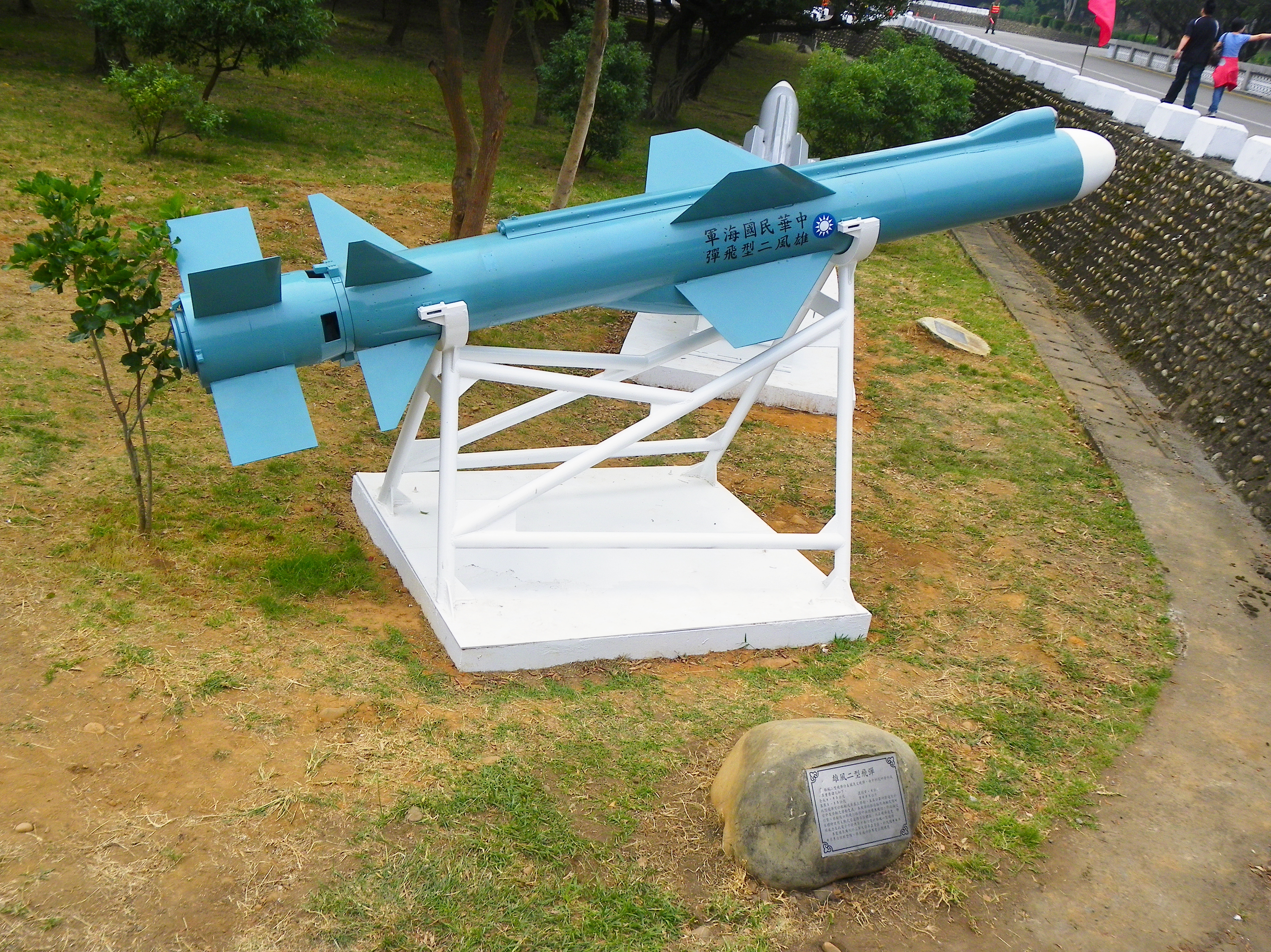
Hsiung Feng II Anti-Ship Missile Display in Chengkungling

Han Kuang-wei (Chinese: 韓光渭; 29 January 1930 – 1 June 2019) was a Taiwanese general officer and engineer.

Han was born on 29 January 1930 in Xiaowangquan, a village in Maping Township, Jimo County, Shandong. He was educated in Qingdao, and traveled by boat to Taiwan during the Great Retreat. After arriving in Taiwan, Han enrolled at Taichung Agricultural College (presently National Chung Hsing University) to study forestry. He graduated from the Republic of China Naval College of Technology (now Chung Cheng Institute of Technology, NDU) in 1955, and was awarded a governmental scholarship to pursue a doctorate in electrical engineering at the Naval Postgraduate School in the United States, which he completed in 1961.

Between 1962 and 1964, Han was an associate professor in the ROCNCT, then a research associate at the University of California, Berkeley, in 1965. He then worked for the National Chung-Shan Institute of Science and Technology (NCSIST) from 1966 to 1995. He led research and development into what became the Hsiung Feng family of missiles, (primarily HF-1 and HF-2), and served as director of the Hsiung Feng project from 1982. Han became deputy director of the NCSIST System Development Center in 1984.

Han was elected a member of Academia Sinica in 1990, and retired from the Republic of China Armed Forces with the rank of major general. During his active military service, and after retirement, Han was an adjunct or visiting professor at several Taiwanese universities, including National Chiao Tung University, National Taiwan University, and Yuan Ze University, where he held a Distinguished Chair Professorship. At his death, he was the only ROCAF general officer to have been elected an academician of the Academia Sinica.

Han died in the United States on 1 June 2019, aged 89. President Tsai Ing-wen issued a posthumous presidential citation commemorating Han on 2 July 2019.
