= Cheng Kung-class frigate =

Class of Taiwanese frigates

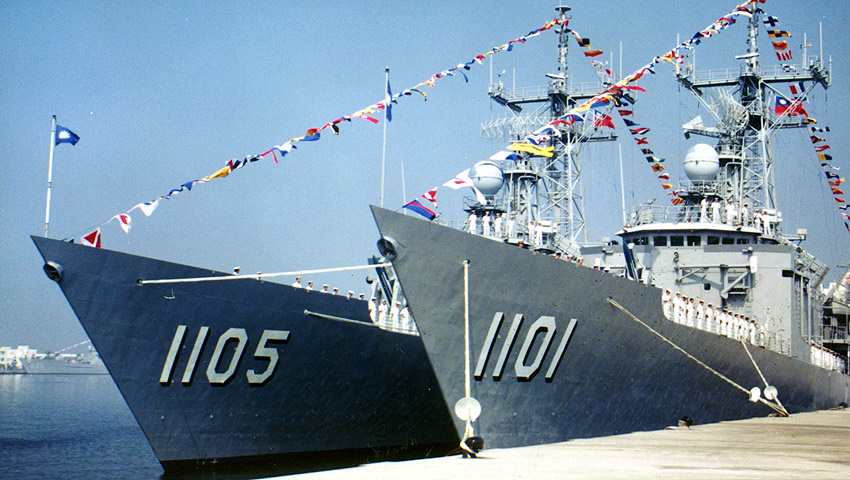
- ROCS Cheng Kung (1101) and ROCS Chi Kuang (1105)

Class overview
- Name: Cheng Kung class
- Builders: China Shipbuilding Corporation
- Operators: Republic of China Navy
- In commission: 1993–present
- Completed: 8
- Active: 8

General characteristics as built
- Type: Frigate
- Displacement: 3,100 long tons (3,100 t) light; 4,200 long tons (4,300 t) full load
- Length: 455 ft 5 in (138.81 m) oa; 413 ft 1 in (125.91 m) wl
- Beam: 45 ft (14 m)
- Draft: 18 ft 8 in (5.69 m)
- Propulsion: 2 × General Electric LM- 2500 gas turbines, 41,000 shp (31,000 kW); 2 × Auxiliary Propulsion Units, 720 hp (540 kW)
- Speed: 29 knots (54 km/h; 33 mph)
- Range: 5,000 nmi (9,300 km; 5,800 mi) at 18 knots (33 km/h; 21 mph)
- Complement: 235
- Sensors & processing systems: Radar: AN/SPS-49, AN/SPS-55, Mk 92 fire control system; Sonar: SQS-56 hull-mounted sonar
- Electronic warfare & decoys: SLQ-32(V)2; Mark 36 SRBOC; AN/SLQ-25 Nixie
- Armament: 1 × Mk 13 Launcher for RIM-66 Standard MR missiles; 2 × triple Mark 32 torpedo tubes with Mark 46 anti-submarine torpedoes; 1 × OTO Melara 76 mm/62 caliber naval gun; 2 × Bofors 40 mm/L70 guns; 1 × 20 mm Phalanx CIWS point defense cannon; 2 × Type 75 20 mm/68 caliber guns; 4 × Hsiung Feng II SSM; 4 × Hsiung Feng III SSM or 8 × Hsiung Feng II SSM
- Aircraft carried: 2 × S-70C(M)-1/2 helicopters

The Cheng Kung-class frigates are eight guided-missile frigates in service in the Republic of China Navy (ROCN). They are based upon the U.S. Oliver Hazard Perry class and built by China Shipbuilding Corporation in Kaohsiung, Taiwan under license throughout the 1990s as part of the Kuang Hua I project. These frigates served as the mainstay of the ROCN's area air defense capability prior to the acquisition of the Keelung (Kidd)-class destroyers in 2005. They are designated with the hull classification PFG (Patrol Frigate, Guided missile) rather than FFG (Frigate, Guided missile) used by the Oliver Hazard Perry class.

== Background ==
The Kwang Hua I project came out of renewed relations between Taiwan and the United States following the election of President Ronald Reagan. Reagan's government took a harder stance with China and began joint defense projects with the Taiwanese military. Among them was the Kwang Hua I project which was part of a series of new surface warships being transferred from the United States or developed with their aid. Previously, the Republic of China Navy (ROCN) focused their naval efforts on anti-submarine warfare (ASW) due to mainland China's large submarine force. However, later developments of China's surface fleet led to the arming of ROCN warships with surface-to-surface missiles (SSMs).

== Design and description ==
The Cheng Kung class are based on the long-hulled version of the Oliver Hazard Perry-class frigates of the United States Navy but with modifications. The class was intended to be built in two batches, with Batch I built to the standard design, and Batch II constructed to an improved design, incorporating new technologies. The standard initially had a light displacement of 3,100 long tons (3,100 t) and a full load displacement of 4,200 long tons (4,300 t). They initially measured 455 feet 5 inches (138.81 m) long overall and 413 ft 1 in (125.91 m) at the waterline with a beam of 45 ft (14 m) and a maximum draft of 18 ft 8 in (5.69 m). They are powered by two General Electric LM-2500 gas turbines turning one shaft connected to a controllable pitch propeller, creating 41,000 shaft horsepower (31,000 kW). They also have two drop-down auxiliary propulsion units that create 720 hp (540 kW). This gives them a maximum speed of 29 knots (54 km/h; 33 mph). They carry 587 long tons (596 t) of fuel giving them a range of 5,000 nautical miles (9,300 km; 5,800 mi) at 18 knots (33 km/h; 21 mph). The ships have four 1,000 kW diesel alternator sets for generating electricity. For additional stability in heavy seas, the ships have fin stabilizers. The frigates have a crew of 206 including 13 officers and an air group of 19.

The frigates were initially armed with eight Hsiung Feng II SSMs placed in two box launchers located atop the superstructure aft of the bridge. They also mounted a Mark 13 launcher for RIM-66 Standard MR surface-to-air missiles. They have an OTO Melara 76-millimetre (3 in)/62 dual-purpose naval gun situated forward and two single-mounted Bofors 40 mm (1.6 in)/L70 guns. the 40 mm guns cannot be crewed while the 76 mm gun is firing due to blast effects. (Note: /62 refers to the length of the gun in terms of calibers. A /62 gun is 62 times as long as it is in bore diameter.) The Cheng Kung class mounts a 20 mm (0.79 in)/76 Phalanx close-in weapon system (CIWS) atop the hangar. Flanking the CIWS atop the hangar are two Type 75 20 mm/75 guns. For ASW, the frigates are armed with two triple-mounted 324 mm (12.8 in) Mk 32 torpedo tubes for Mark 46 torpedoes.

The ships mount SPS-55 surface search radar, SPS-49(V)5 air search, Mark 92 fire control radar, STIR 24 missile fire control radar and Mark 90 Phalanx fire control radar. They are also equipped with DE 1160B hull-mounted sonar and are capable of using the ATAS towed passive sonar or the SQR-18A towed sonar. For electronic countermeasures, they mount the Chang Feng IV suite, which consists of the SLQ-32(V)5 radar warning system and the Sidekick radar jammer, and the SLQ-25 Nixie torpedo decoy system. The ships are equipped with the Prairie-Masker acoustic signature reduction system. The ships came designed with a hangar and aft helicopter deck capable of operating two helicopters. However, the ROCN had difficulty acquiring helicopters capable of operating from the class until they obtained the S-70C Thunderhawk helicopters from the United States. Though capable of operating two, only one is kept housed aboard the frigates. The ships use the Recovery Assist, Secure and Traverse (RAST) haul-down system for their helicopters.

=== Upgrades ===
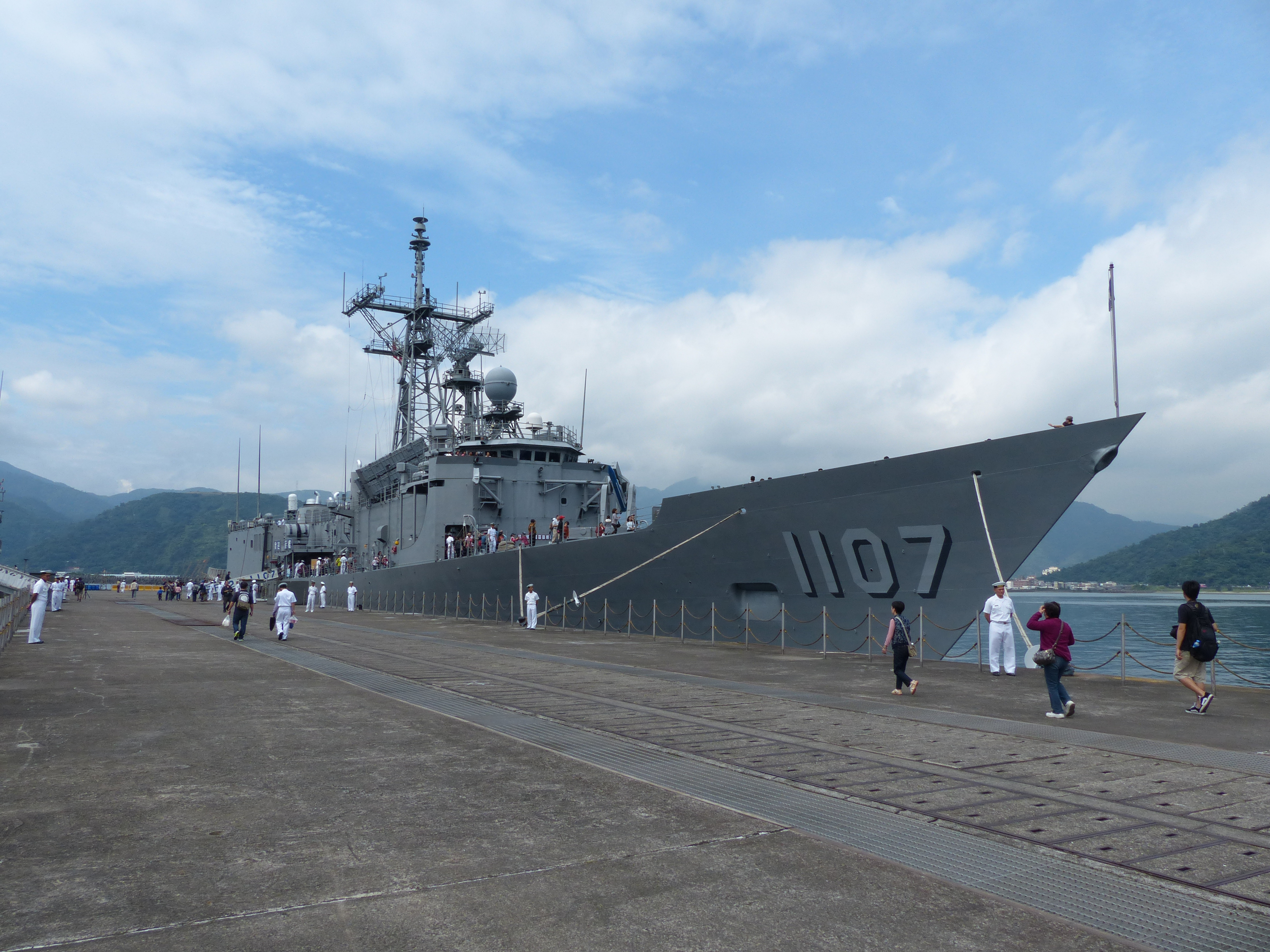
Tzu I

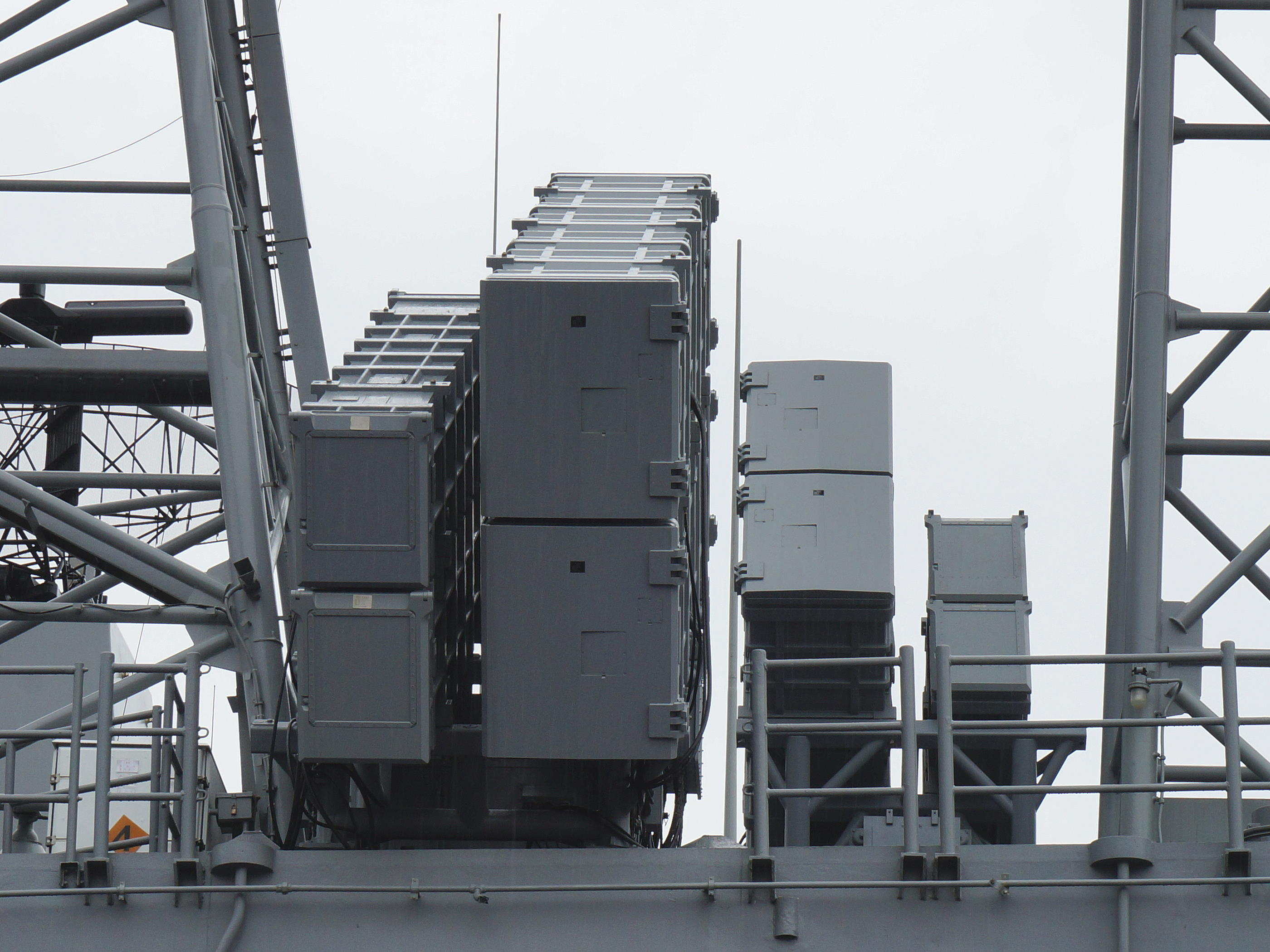
Hsiung Feng II and Hsiung Feng III launchers of Tian Dan

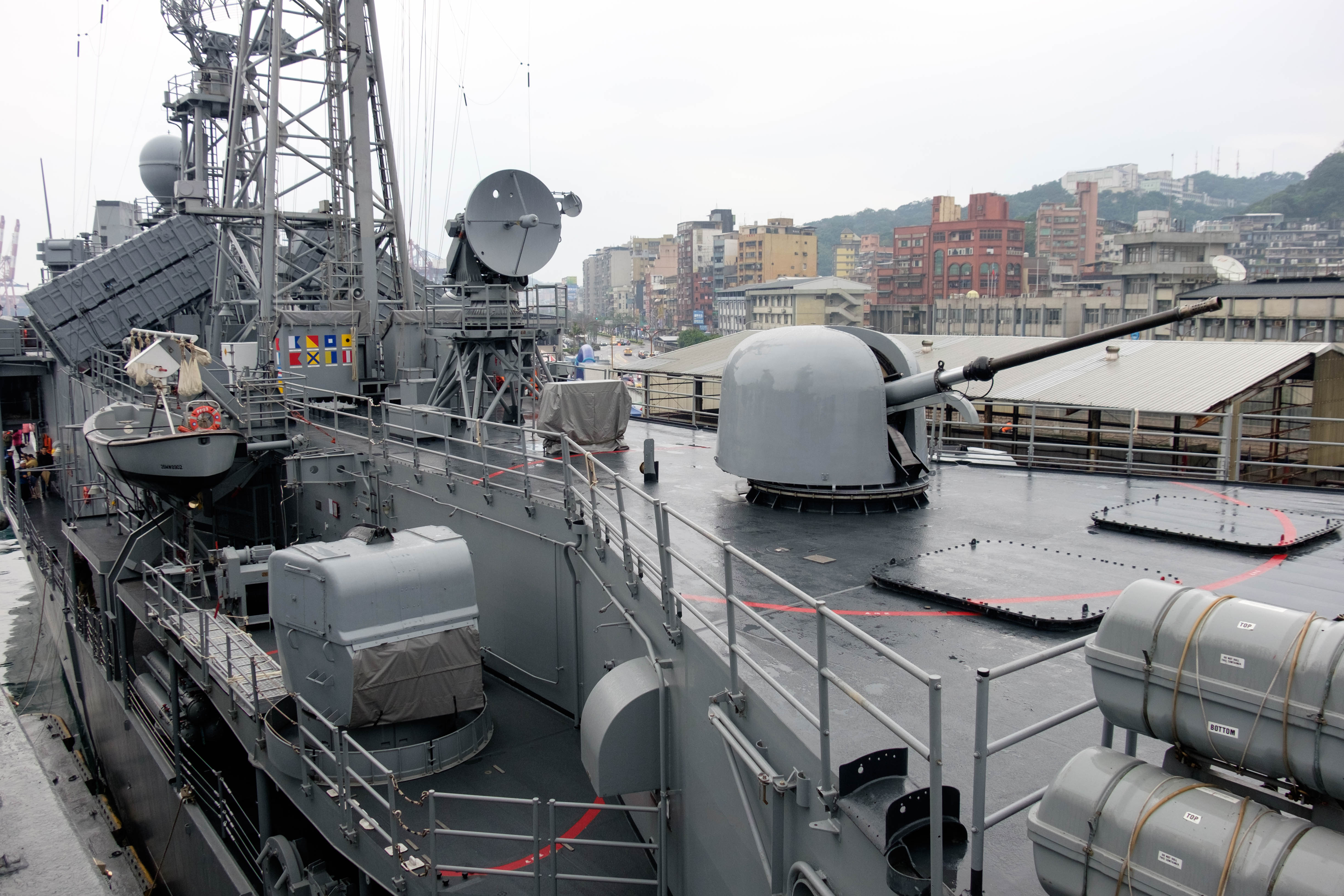
Central upper deck of Chang Chien

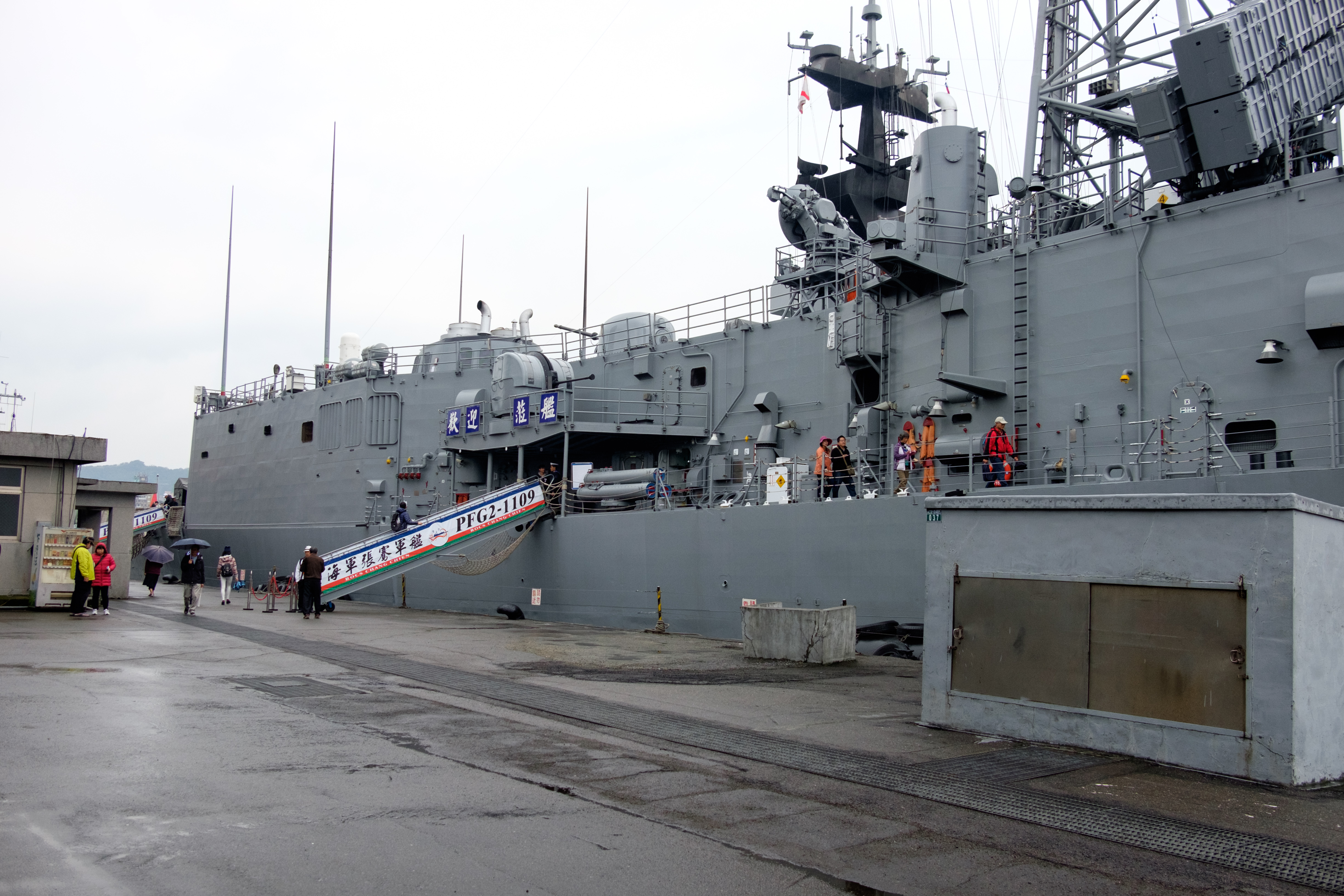
Rear starboard of Chang Chien

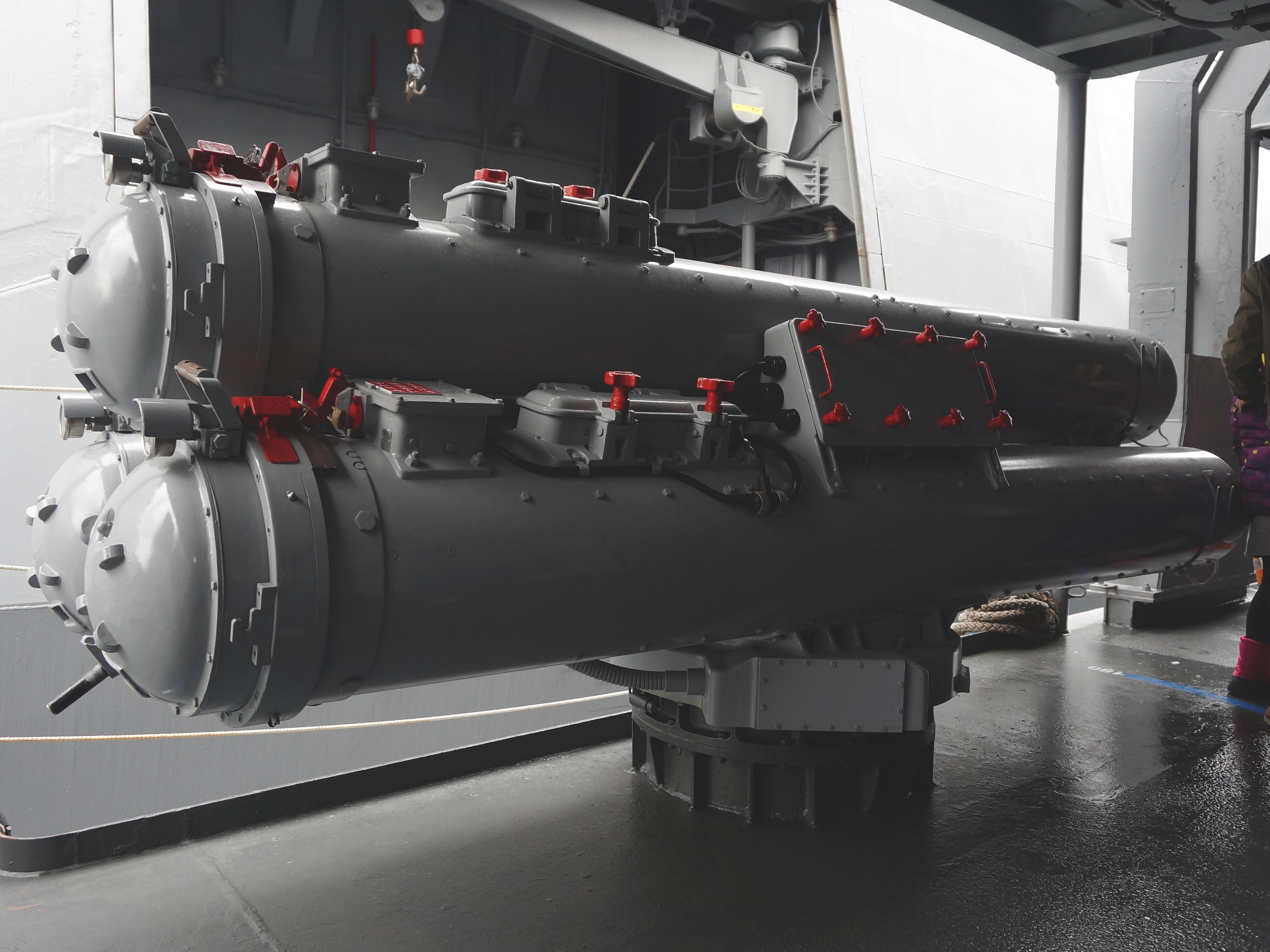
Mk 32 torpedo tubes

The displacement of the Cheng Kung-clas frigates has varied over time. In 2009, it was reported that the vessels had a light displacement of 2,750 long tons (2,790 t) and a full load displacement of 4,105 long tons (4,171 t). Furthermore, their draft increased to a maximum of 24 ft 5 in (7.44 m). This increased again by 2013, with the ships displacing 3,207 long tons (3,258 t) light with a maximum draft of 28 ft 3 in (8.60 m).

The Cheng Kung class was initially fitted with eight Hsiung Feng II SSMs, instead of the Harpoon missiles that the Oliver Hazard Perry class used. Ships of the class began refitting with four Hsiung Feng III (HF III) missiles, replacing four of the Hsiung Feng II missiles after the new HF III missiles entered production. In addition, the ROCN ordered Harpoon missiles for use by the Cheng Kungs in September 2000. After the US stopped supporting the SM-1 and their associated launch system support was taken up by NCSIST which also implemented an upgrade program for the missiles. Upgrades to the SM-1 include a better rocket motor and an active seeker.

The class's Mk 75 main guns have been upgraded and have an improved firing rate of 100 rounds a minute.

== Construction ==
The Cheng Kung-class frigates were ordered from the China Shipbuilding Corporation of Kaoshuing, Taiwan, on 8 May 1989. They are named after historical Chinese commanders. The first two ships of the class were constructed from pre-fabricated sets supplied by Bath Iron Works, which also worked in conjunction with China Shipbuilding Corporation on the remaining frigates. Initially, only the first four hulls were intended to be part of the Batch I standard design. However, delays in the development of new surface-to-air missiles and electronics issues led to additional three hulls being built to the standard design. Eventually, the second batch was canceled in October 1994. An eighth hull was ordered in January 1999. The eighth ship was intended to be the first of the Batch II hulls, but it too was built to the standard design. Funding for the eighth ship only became in December 2000.

== Ships in class ==
Cheng Kung class construction data
Hull number	Name	Builder	Laid down	Launched	Commissioned	Status
1101	Cheng Kung (成功)	China Shipbuilding Corporation, Kaoshuing, Taiwan	January 7, 1990 (Note: Wertheim has the ship laid down on December 2, 1990)	October 5, 1991 (Note: Wertheim has the ship launched on October 27, 1991)	May 7, 1993	Active
1103	Cheng Ho (鄭和)	China Shipbuilding Corporation, Kaoshuing, Taiwan	December 21, 1991	October 15, 1992	March 28, 1994	Active
1105	Chi Kuang (繼光)	China Shipbuilding Corporation, Kaoshuing, Taiwan	October 4, 1991	September 27, 1993	March 4, 1995	Active
1106	Yueh Fei (岳飛)	China Shipbuilding Corporation, Kaoshuing, Taiwan	September 5, 1992	August 26, 1994	February 7, 1996	Active
1107	Tzu I (子儀)	China Shipbuilding Corporation, Kaoshuing, Taiwan	August 7, 1994	July 13, 1995	January 9, 1997	Active
1108	Pan Chao (班超)	China Shipbuilding Corporation, Kaoshuing, Taiwan	July 25, 1995	July 4, 1996 (Note: Wertheim has the launch date as July 3, 1996.)	December 16, 1997	Active
1109	Chang Chien (張騫)	China Shipbuilding Corporation, Kaoshuing, Taiwan	December 4, 1995 (Note: Wertheim has the ship laid down in June 1996.)	May 14, 1997	December 1, 1998	Active
1110	Tian Dan (田單)	China Shipbuilding Corporation, Kaoshuing, Taiwan	February 21, 2001 (Note: Wertheim has the ship laid down in April 2001.)	October 15, 2002 (Note: Wertheim has the launch date as October 17, 2002.)	March 11, 2004	Active

=== Additional Oliver Hazard Perry-class frigates ===
On November 5, 2012, Taiwan announced the U.S. government would sell them two additional Oliver Hazard Perry-class frigates that are about to be retired from the United States Navy for a cost of US$240 million. They were to be retrofitted and delivered in 2015. The Naval Vessel Transfer Act of 2013 was signed by President Barack Obama in 2014, allowing up to four of the frigates to be sold to Taiwan. Two ships were eventually selected and were reactivated by VSE Corporation and transferred to Taiwan on March 9, 2017. These ships would replace aging Chiyang-class (ex-Knox-class) vessels. Both ships were commissioned into the ROCN on November 8, 2018.

Ships in class
Hull number	Name	Former name	Commissioned	Status
1112	Ming-chuan (銘傳)	ex-USS Taylor	November 8, 2018	Active
1115	Feng Jia (逢甲)	ex-USS Gary	November 8, 2018	Active

== See also ==
- List of frigate classes in service

Equivalent frigates of the same era

- Jacob van Heemskerck class
- Santa María class
- Godavari class
- Adelaide class
- Cassard class
