= Hsiung Feng II =

Taiwanese anti-ship missile

Hsiung Feng II 雄風二型
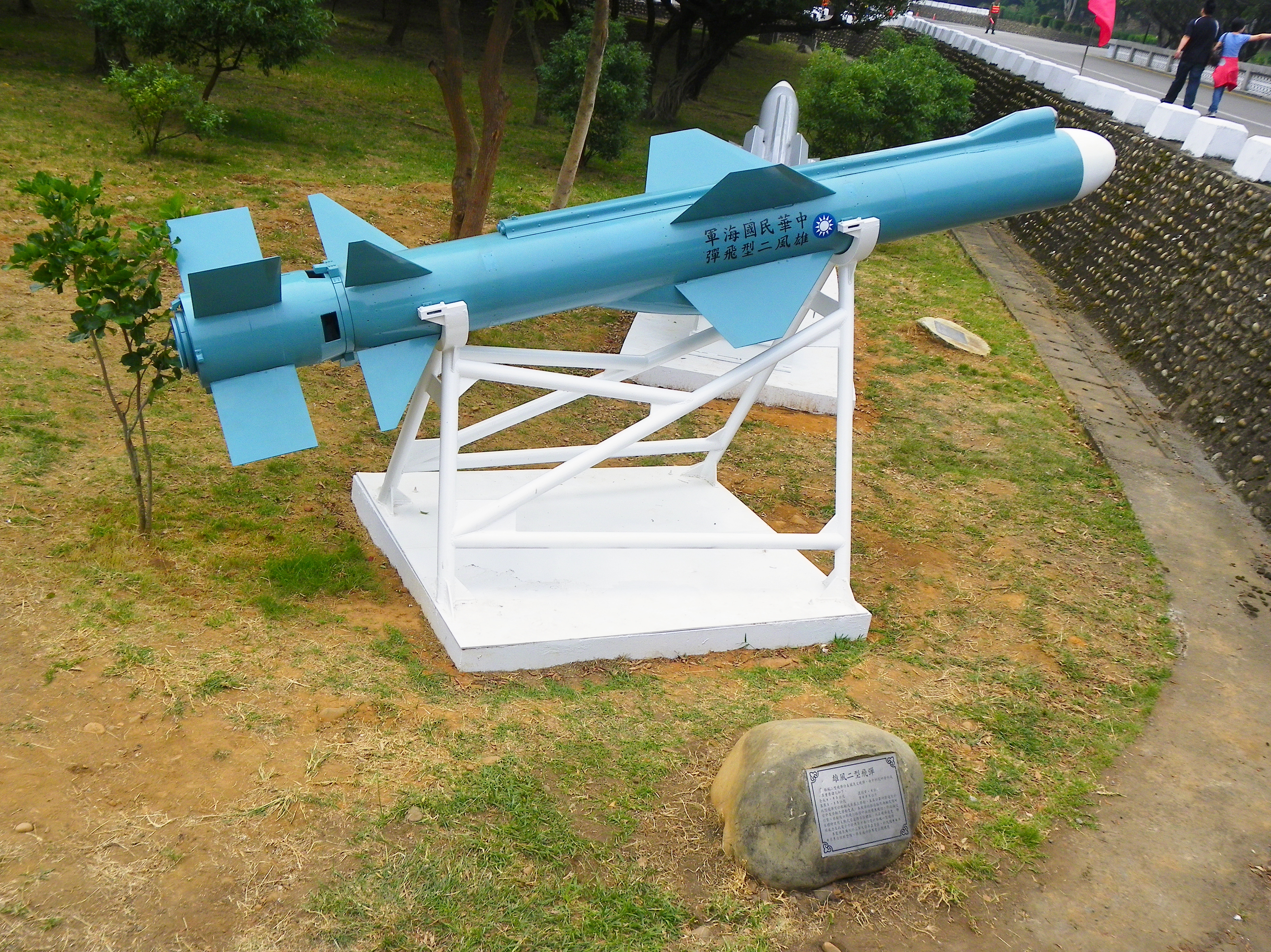
- Hsiung Feng II Anti-Ship Missile Display in Chengkungling.
- Type: Surface-to-surface missile
- Place of origin: Taiwan

Service history
- In service: Early 1990s-present
- Used by: Republic of China Armed Forces

Production history
- Designer: National Chung-Shan Institute of Science and Technology
- Variants: Air launched version without first stage rocket booster

Specifications
- Mass: 685 kg (1,510 lb)
- Length: 4,800 mm (190 in)
- Diameter: 400 mm (16 in)
- Warhead weight: 180 kg (400 lb)
- Operational range: 160 km (99 mi) (Block 1) 250 km (160 mi) (Block 2)
- Maximum speed: 1,041 km/h (647 mph)
- Guidance system: Inertial guidance midflight, terminal with dual active radar homing and infrared homing seekers
- Launch platform: Box launcher or aircraft

The Hsiung Feng II (HF-2; Chinese: 雄風二型; pinyin: Xióngfēng èr xíng, "Brave Wind II") is an anti-ship missile system developed by the National Chung-Shan Institute of Science and Technology (NCSIST) in Taiwan. The HF-2 is designed to be deployed aboard ships or at facilities on land. An airborne version has also been developed which can be carried by the ROC Air Force's F-CK fighters. The HF-2 has ECCM capabilities and is deployed on the ROC Navy's Cheng Kung-class and La Fayette-class frigates, as well as at several land-based sites.

== Versions ==
There are three major versions of HF-2 in service. The first to enter service is the ship-based HF-2, with 2 twin box launcher on destroyer DD-915 first as a trial vessel. Later all major surface combatant in RoCN, except the Knox, were equipped with 2 quad-launchers, plus the 7 World War II-era Gearing-class guided missile destroyers that was upgraded to WC3 standard, from the late 1980s to mid-1990s, had added a 1 quad-launcher by mid-1990s to give those air defense ships an anti-surface ability.

An air-launched version appeared in the early 1990s. Carried by two AIDC AT-3B trainer/attacker and a single A-3 attacker, the small force poses little threat to the marine intruders due to its small quantity. However, the recent upgraded IDF (F-CK-1C/D) will add the capacity to carry and launch the HF-2, thus greatly enhance the air-to-surface capacity of RoCAF in future. The air launcher version of HF-2 carried by AT-3 is different from the one supposed carried by original IDF (F-CK-1A/B) prototype, due to differences in length of the HF-2 missile (better known as HF-2 Mark 3 and Mark 4), where the rocket designed for one aircraft cannot fit on another aircraft. Unknown if air-launched HF-2 program is continuing at this point.

The land-launch version of the HF-2 is the most secretive one because of its relation with the land-attack version of HF-2E. Fixed base versions were produced first, and all major outlying islands of Taiwan were equipped with fortified HF-2 bases in the late 1990s, replacing old HF-1 bases. Fixed HF-1 bases in the main island were also being replaced with fixed HF-2 launchers, again in fortified positions.

The mobile launcher version was accepted in 2005 and went to mass production in 2006. All mobile launchers, together with mobile command center (with data-link), mobile surface search radar and portable electric generators, were kept in harden shelters and being driven out when needed. The HF-2 mobile launchers, shown in 10 October 2007 parade, was designed to be able to carry both HF-2 and the new HF-3 AShM, by leaving room for the larger HF-3 missile boxes. Same was done to the Oliver Hazard Perry/Cheng Kung-class frigate's new HF-2 launchers after each frigate's major overhaul, starting 2001, that allows the launcher to carry larger HF-3 AShM, besides HF-2. The Ching Chiang-class patrol ships (total 12 built) also are undergoing the same upgrade to carry two twin-mounted HF-2/3 anti-ship missiles. The Kuang Hua VI-class missile boats (total 31 built) carry two twin-mounted HF-2 anti-ship missiles. The Tuo Chiang-class corvettes also carry four quad-mounted HF-2/HF-3 anti-ship missiles.

A submarine-launched version was planned and designed in the mid-1990s, but nothing more was heard.

== Block II ==
In late 2014, CSIST reportedly began the test-launching stage of an extended-range version of the HF-2, increasing range from 160 km (99 mi) to 250 km (160 mi); the range increase was successfully achieved by February 2017.

In 2019 mass production of an improved Block IIB was approved with production to be completed by 2023.

== Future development ==
=== HF-2B ===
In November 2019 NCSIST tested a new short range anti-ship missile which while weighting significantly less than the Hsiung Feng II is said to have the same range. The test was conducted using NCSIST’s Glorious Star test ship. The provisional designation is HF-2B and production is scheduled to begin in 2021. The reported range of the HF-2B is 250 km.

== General characteristics ==
- Primary function: Anti-ship missile, some prototypes land attack cruise missiles
- Power plant: Solid propellant booster, turbojet in-flight
- Range: 160 km (99 mi) (antiship)
- Top speed: Mach 0.85 (1,040 km/h; 647 mph)
- Weight: 685 kg (1,510 lb)
- Length: 4.8 m (16 ft)
- Diameter: 40 cm (16 in)
- Warhead: 180 kg (400 lb) high-explosive warhead plus advanced technology self-forging fragmentation
- Guidance: Inertial guidance midflight, terminal with dual active radar homing and infrared homing seekers
- Date deployed: Early 1990s

== Popular culture ==
In 2019 Sputnik News and other began propagating a conspiracy theory that the Argentinian submarine ARA San Juan had been sunk by a Taiwanese HF-2 anti-ship missile used by international mercenaries working for multinational oil companies.

== Gallery ==
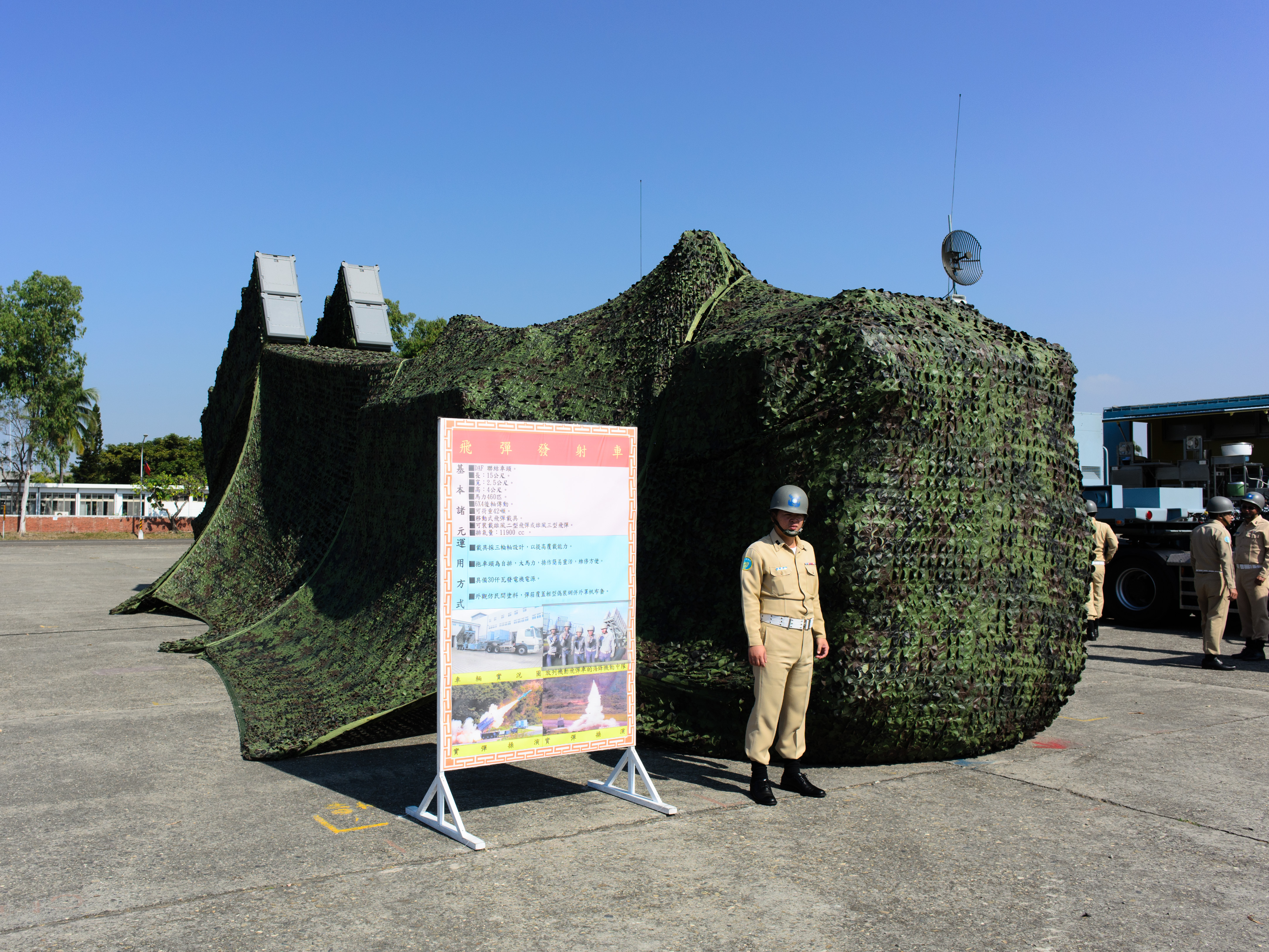
Covered ROCN Hsiung Feng II Anti-Ship Missile Launcher Truck Display at Zuoying Naval Base Ground

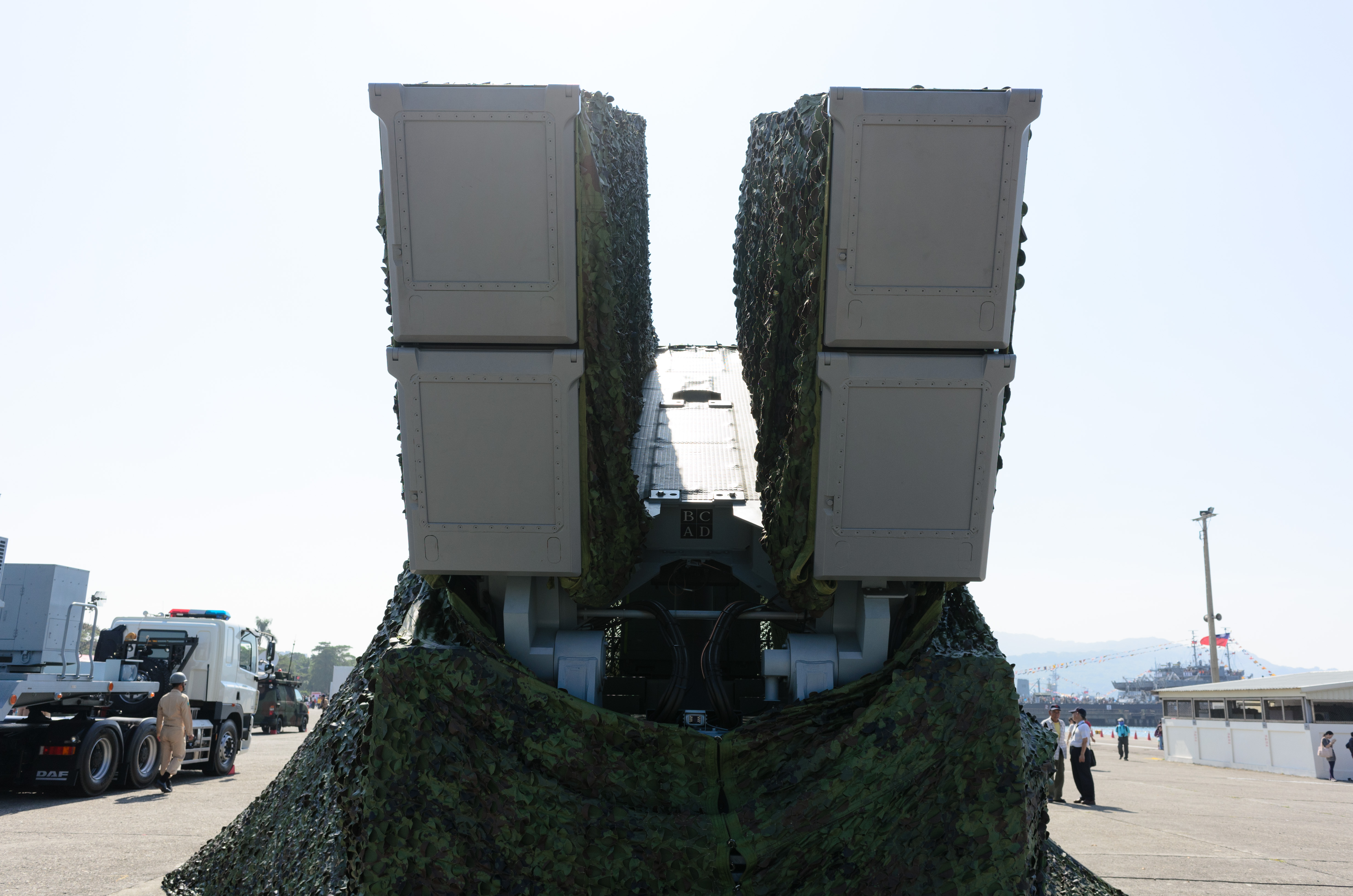
Rear view of HF-2 launcher

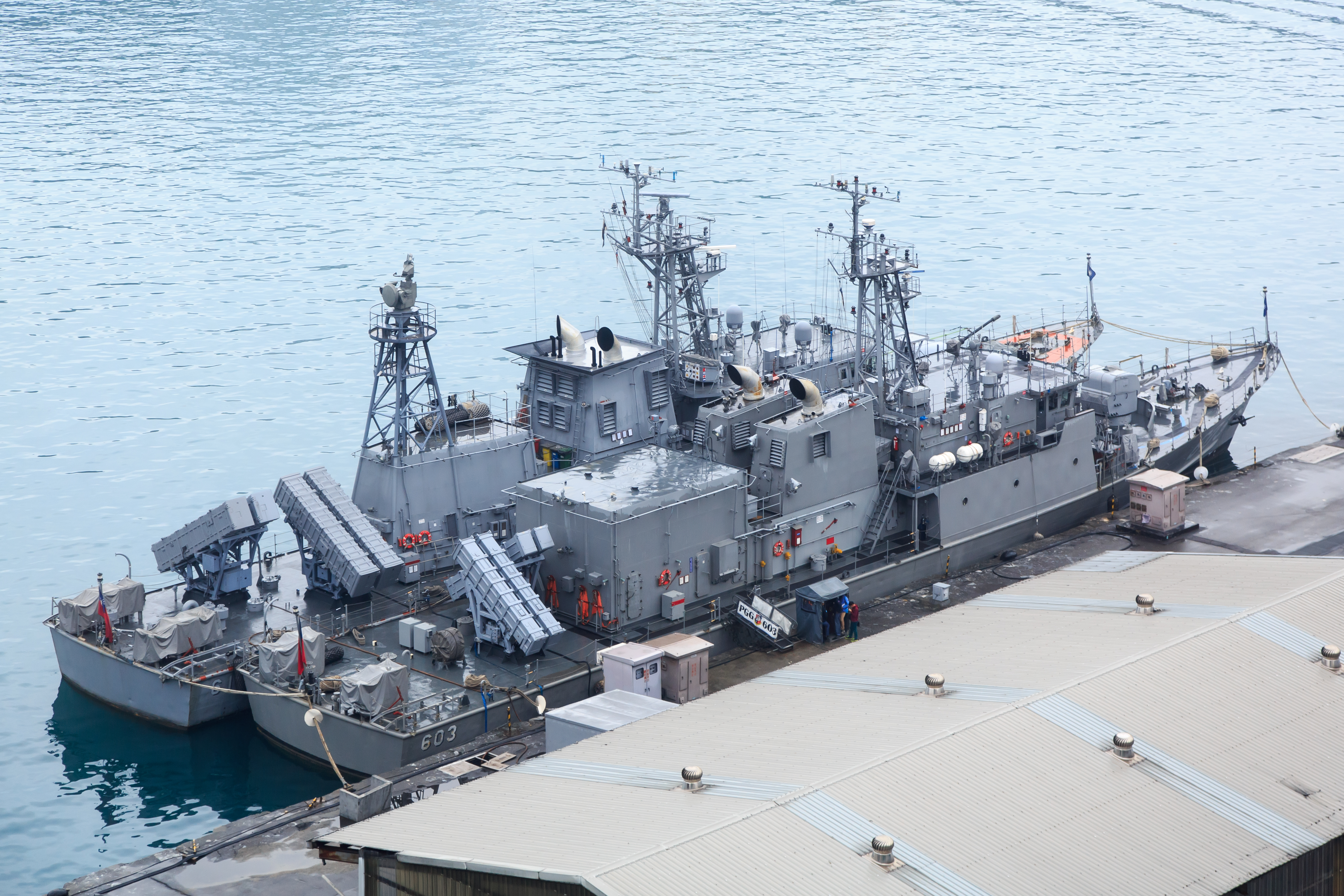
Two vessels of the Ching Chiang class at Keelung, Taiwan. The vessel on the right is armed with Hsiung Feng II

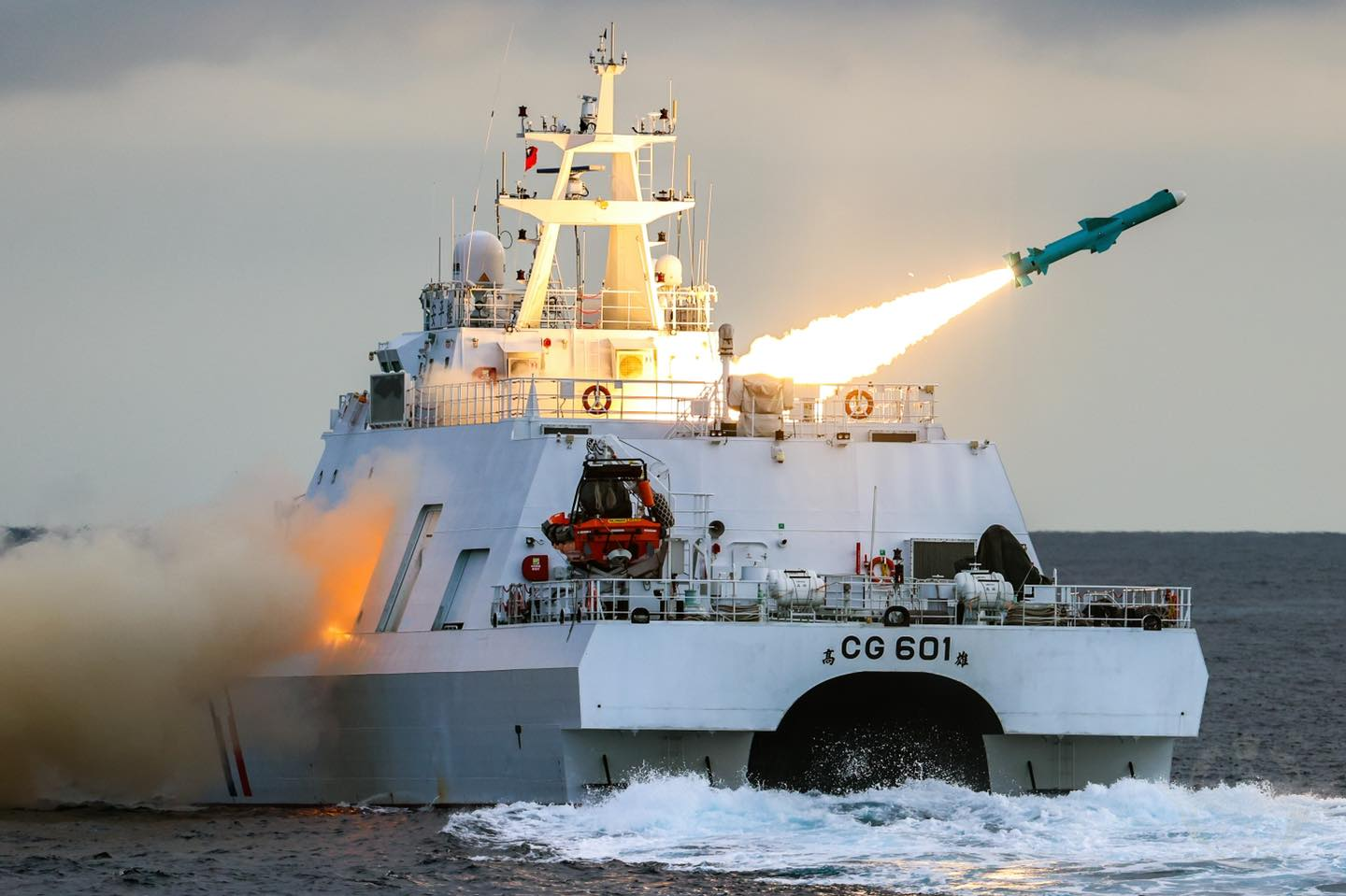
Taiwan Coast Guard Anping-class offshore patrol vessel Anping launches a Hsiung Feng II anti-ship missiles

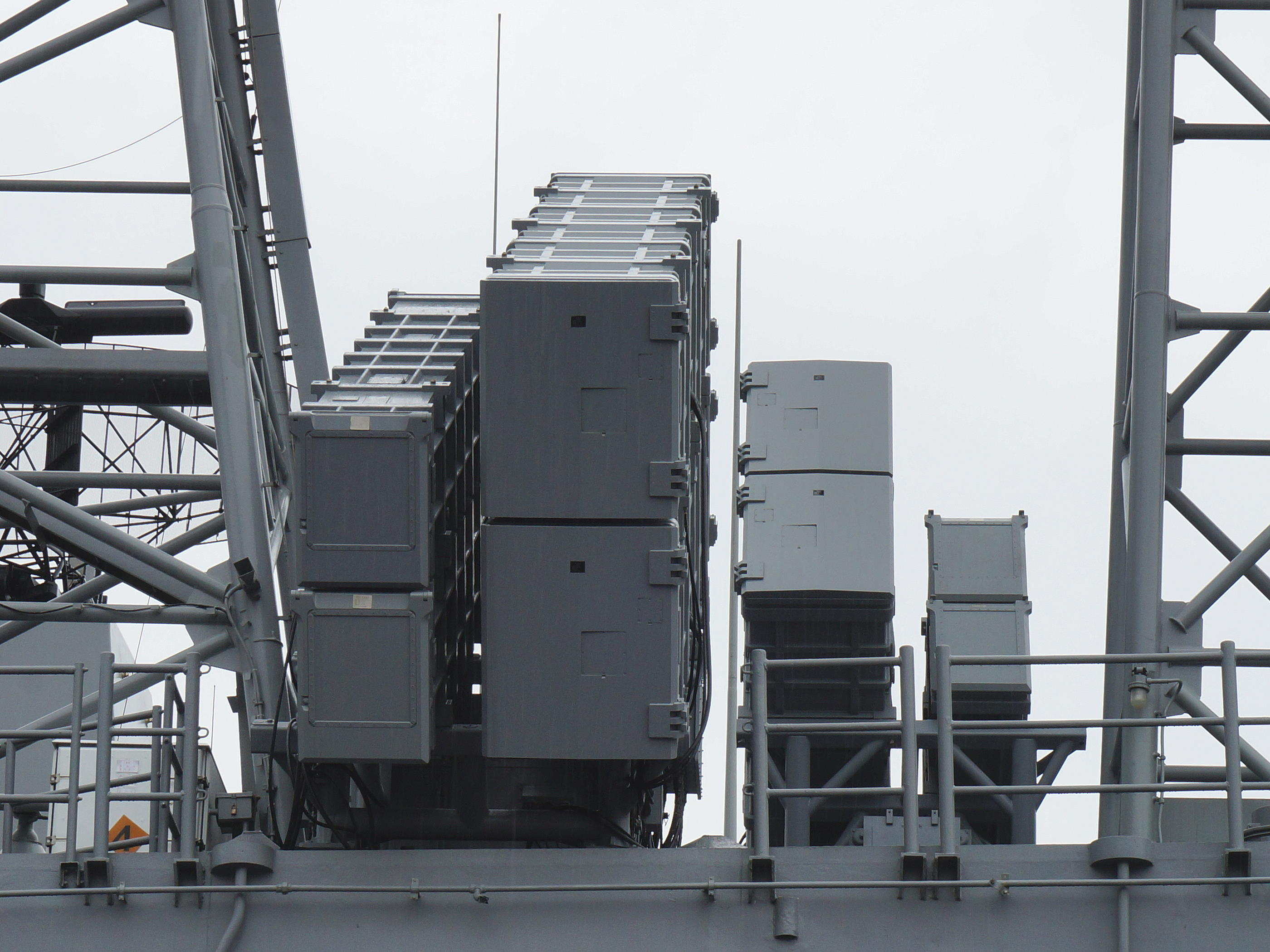
Hsiung Feng II and Hsiung Feng III launchers aboard the ROCN Cheng Kung-class frigate Tian Dan (田單)

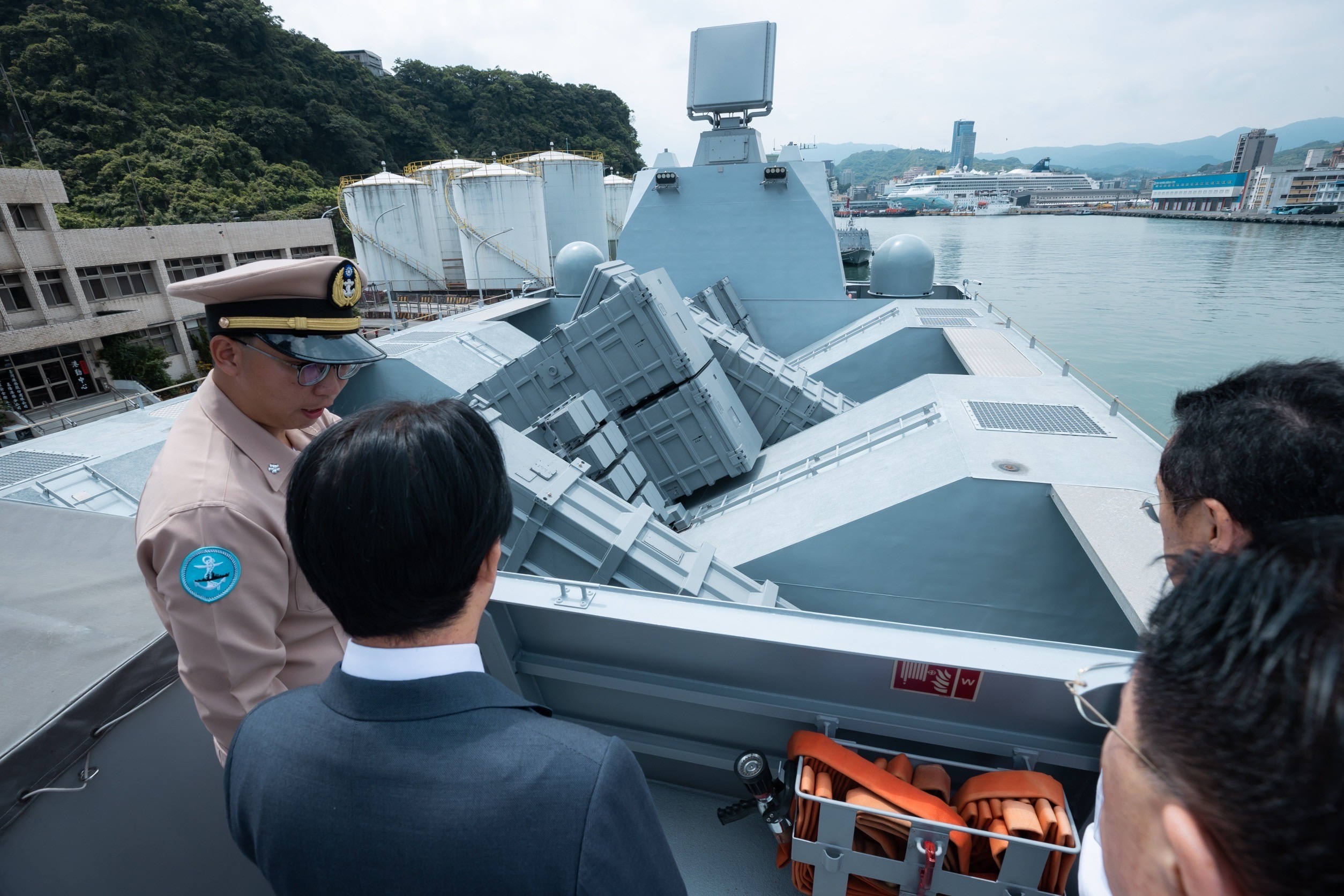
HF-2, HF-3, and TC-2N with CS/MPQ-90 Bee Eye in background aboard PGG-621 Hsu Chiang

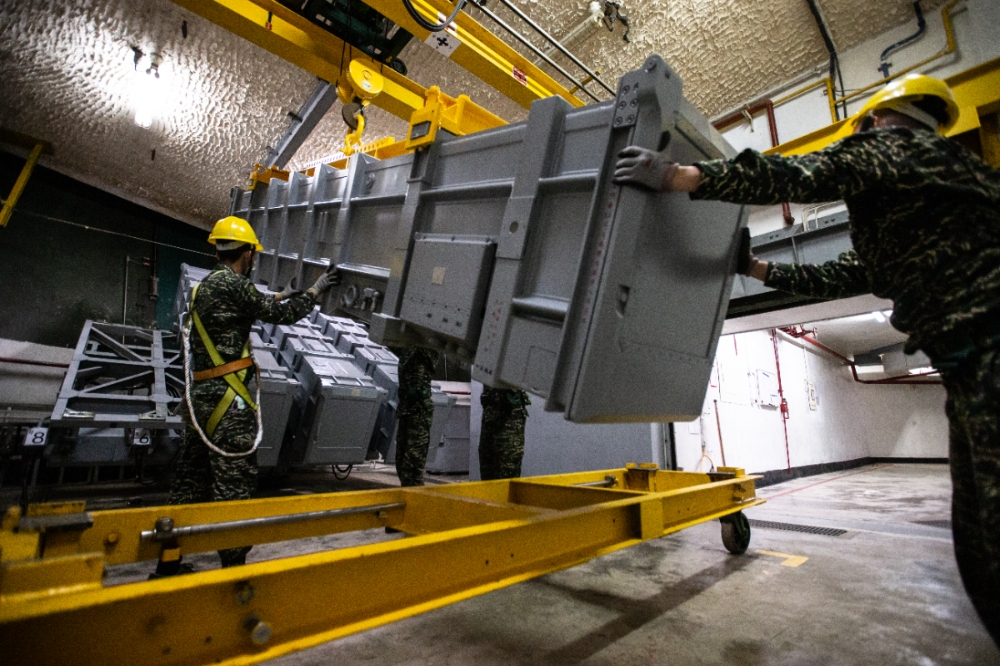
ROCN Hsiung Feng II missiles in an underground missile launch bunker

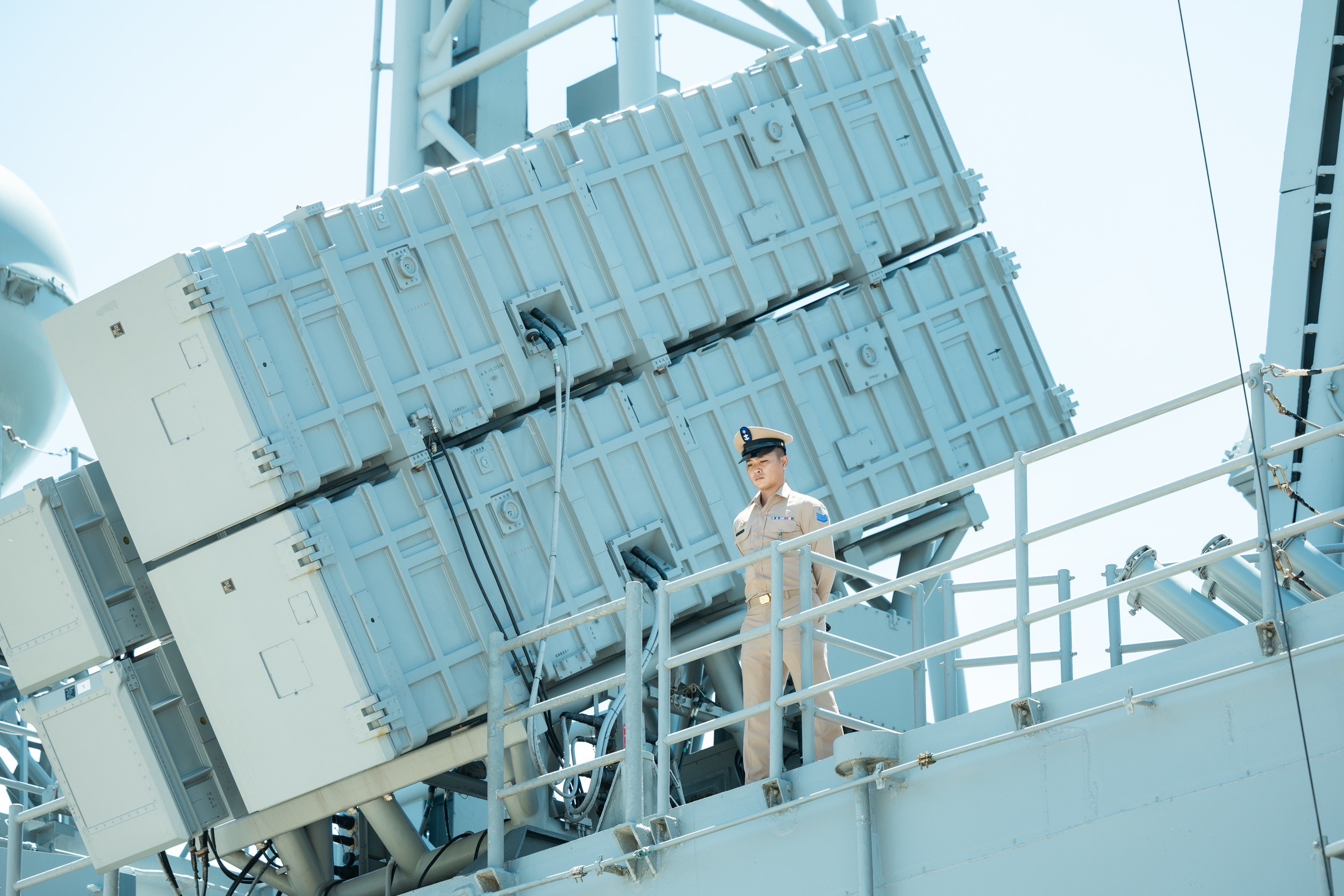
HF-2 and HF-3 aboard ROCN Cheng Ho (PFG2-1103)

== See also ==
- Hsiung Feng I – (Taiwan)
- Hsiung Feng IIE – (Taiwan)
- Hsiung Feng III – (Taiwan)
- YJ-83 – (China)
- C-802 – (China)
- Han Kuang-wei – Taiwanese military officer and engineer (1930–2019)
- Anping-class offshore patrol vessel
