= Hsiung Feng I =

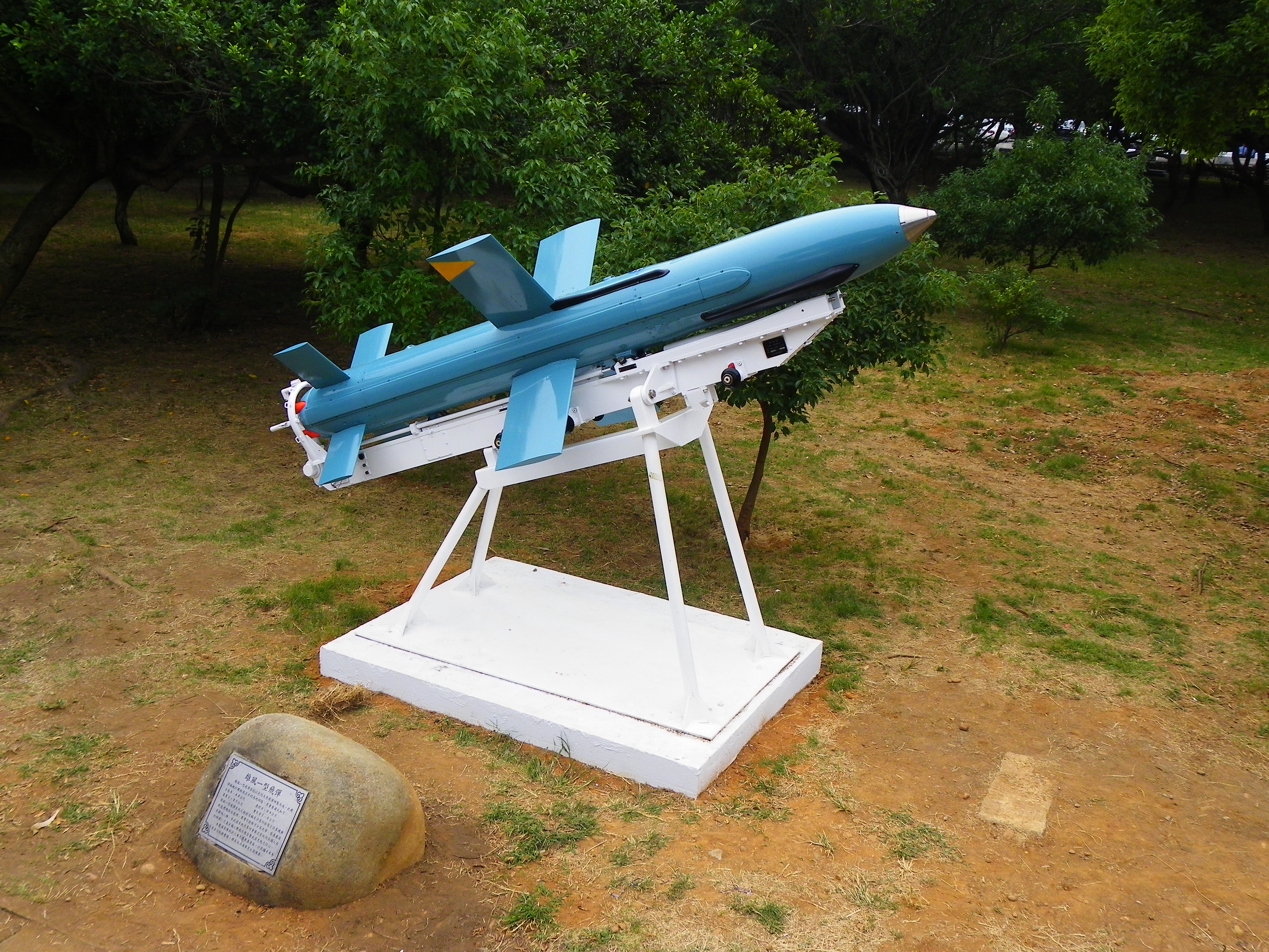
Hsiung Feng I Anti-ship Missile

The Hsiung Feng I (HF-1) (雄風一型, "Brave Wind I") is an anti-ship missile system developed by the National Chung-Shan Institute of Science and Technology in Taiwan between 1975 and 1978 in response to the SY-1 missile being introduced into service with the opposing People's Liberation Army Navy.

== Development ==
As NCSIST's previous experience with anti-ship missile development was limited to experimentally fitting warheads onto MQM-33B drones, the decision was made to base the weapon on the Israeli Gabriel Mk I with necessary modifications added in order to remain competitive against the SY-1 missile, making it essentially a Taiwanese interpretation of the Gabriel Mk II (and since the Republic of China Navy did also import several sets of Gabriel Mk II system to rehabilitate three of their Allen M. Sumner class destroyers, they also stipulated the HF-I to be made interchangeable with the Israeli-made ordnance).

The system uses the Taiwanese CS/SPG-21A as a target acquisition and fire control radar. The CS/SPG-21A reportedly has a range of 37 km which was later upgraded to 46 km.

== Service history ==
The Hsiung Feng I was officially a reverse-engineered version of Gabriel Mk.2 antiship missile, although Israel is believed to have cooperated with Taiwan. Sun Yat-sen Institute and National Chung-Shan Institute of Science and Technology redesigned the missile to include Taiwanese components.

First test-fire of Hsiung Feng I was done in 1977. Initial production started in 1979. HF-I design flaws with the radar radio frequency altimeter, cooling system, and the rocket motor undermined the missile's effectiveness. Taiwan redesigned the missile to create the Hsiung Feng IA (HF-1A), which went into production in 1981. The missile was in service until 2012.

Prior to the service entry of the Hsiung Feng II missile, it was the primary anti-ship weapon on all of the ROC Navy's frontline surface combatants, including the majority of the service's Gearing class and Allen M. Sumner class destroyers. It is currently deployed on the ROCN's littoral combatants, most notably the Hai Ou class missile boats, as well as some land based facilities. Due to it being superseded by the Hsiung Feng II on larger patrol craft and in coastal batteries, the HF-1 is being phased out of service (along with Hai Ou class FACs). The last ship to carry the missile converted to the HF-2 in early 2013. The missiles were sent back to NCSIST for decommissioning.

== Variants ==
=== HF-IA ===
The IA variant was created to address deficiencies with the radar radio frequency altimeter, cooling system, and the rocket motor of the missile. The redesigned missile was designated HF-1A and entered production in 1981.

== General characteristics ==
- Primary Function: Anti-ship missile
- Power Plant: One-stage dual-thrust solid propellant rocket motor
- Range: 46 km
- Top Speed: Mach 0.65 or 240 m/s
- Length: 3.4 m
- Diameter: 34 cm
- Launch weight: 537.5 kg
- Warhead: 150 kg high explosive
- Guidance: Radar beam riding plus terminal semi-active radar homing
- Date Deployed: 1978

== See also ==
- Hsiung Feng II
- Hsiung Feng IIE
- Hsiung Feng III
- Han Kuang-wei
