= Chengkungling History Museum =

Museum in Wuri, Taichung, Taiwan

- 成功嶺歷史館
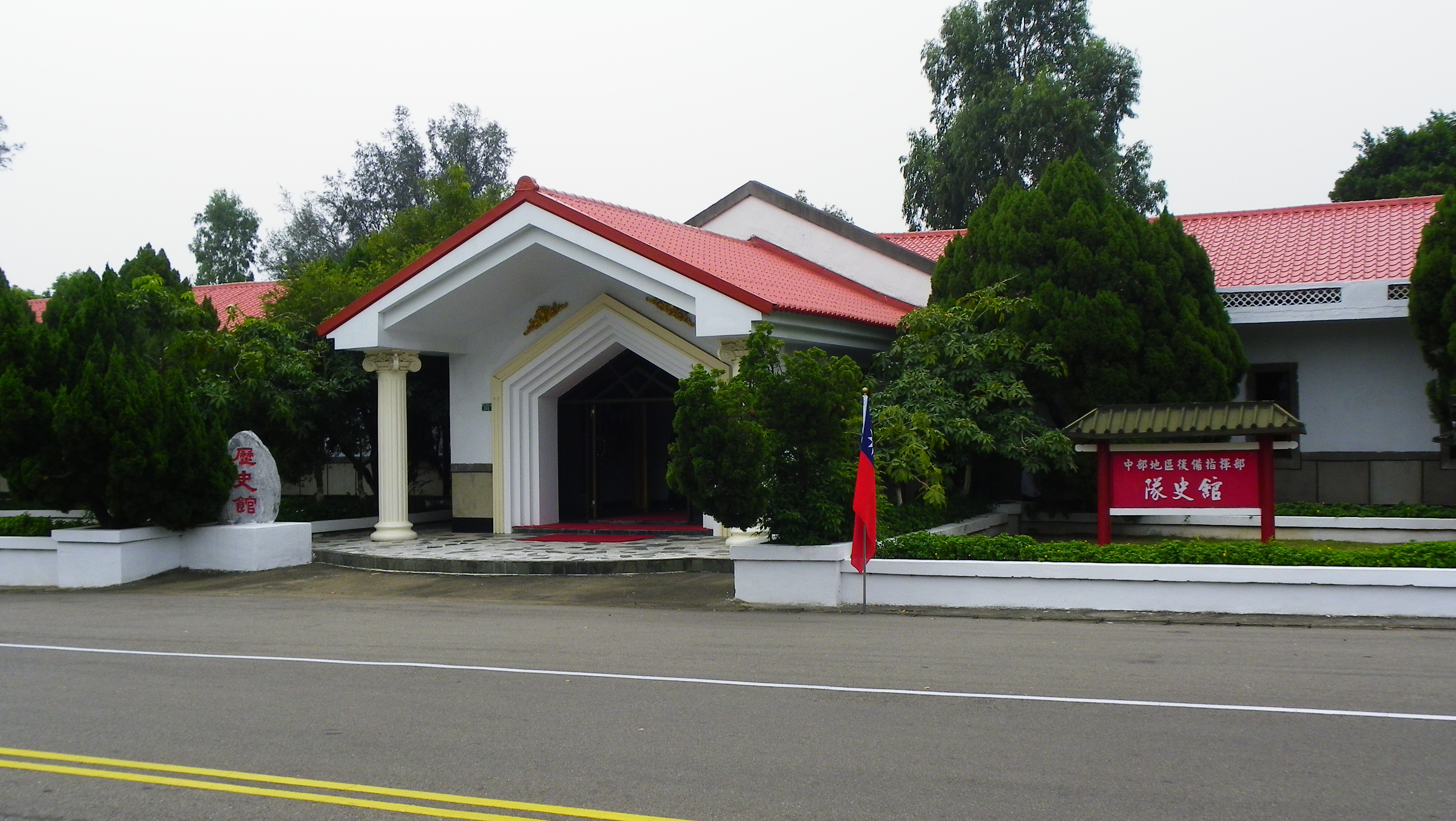
- Location: Wuri, Taichung, Taiwan
- Coordinates: 24°07′11.0″N 120°36′05.9″E
- Type: museum

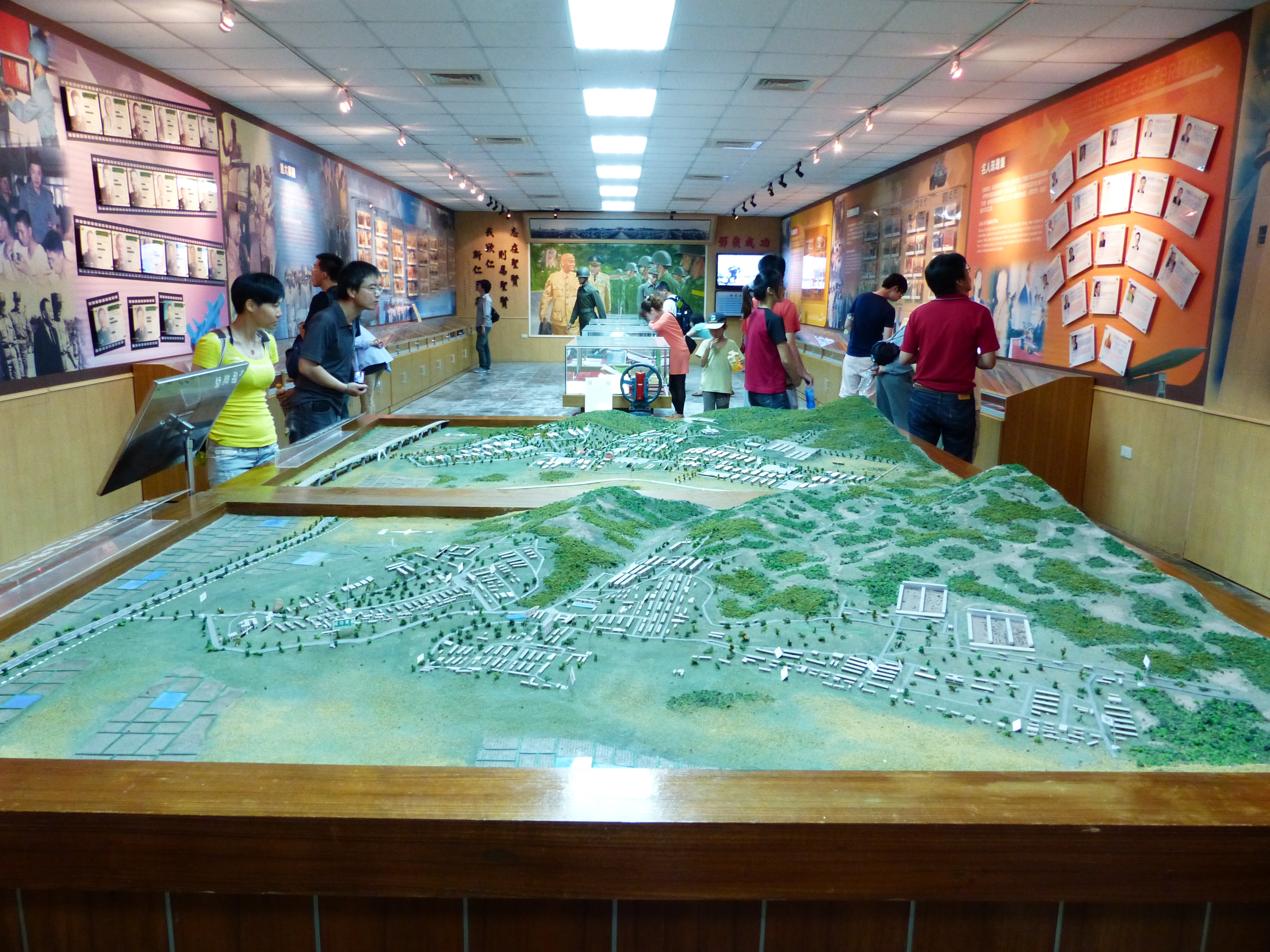
Chengkungling History Museum exhibition hall

The Chengkungling History Museum (Chinese: 成功嶺歷史館; pinyin: Chénggōnglǐng Lìshǐguǎn) is a museum in Chengkungling, a military training centre in Wuri District, Taichung, Taiwan.

== See also ==
- List of museums in Taiwan
