= ROCS Tzu I =

Cheng Kung-class frigates

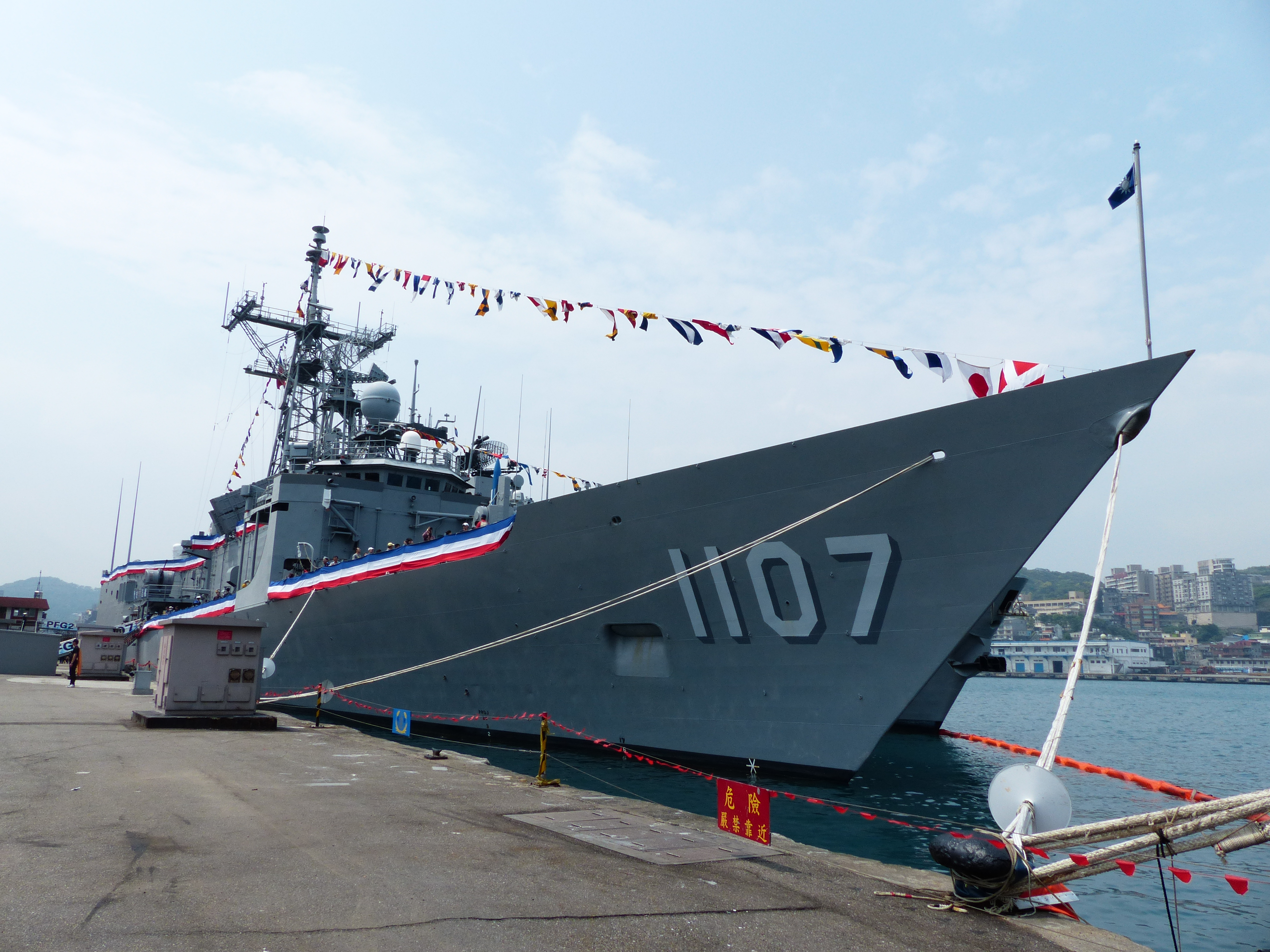
- ROCS Tzu I on 27 March 2014

History

Taiwan
- Name: Tzu I; (郭子儀)
- Namesake: Guo Ziyi
- Builder: China Shipbuilding Corp., Kaohsiung
- Laid down: 7 August 1994
- Launched: 13 July 1995
- Commissioned: 9 January 1997
- Home port: Tsoying
- Identification: Pennant number: PFG2-1107
- Status: in active service

General characteristics
- Class & type: Cheng Kung-class frigate
- Displacement: 4,103 long tons (4,169 t) full
- Length: 453 ft (138 m)
- Beam: 46.95 ft (14.31 m)
- Installed power: 40,000 shp total
- Propulsion: General Electric LM2500-30 gas turbines
- Speed: 29 knots
- Complement: 18 officers; 180 enlisted; 19 flight crew
- Sensors & processing systems: AN/SPS-49 air-search radar; AN/SPS-55 surface-search radar; CAS, STIR gun fire control radar; SQS-56 sonar
- Electronic warfare & decoys: AN/SLQ-32(V)5; (AN/SLQ-32(V)2 + SIDEKICK)
- Armament: 40 × SM-1MR at Mk 13 Missile Launcher; 4 × Hsiung Feng II and 4 HF-3 supersonic AShM; 1 × OTO Melara 76 mm naval gun; 2 × Bofors 40mm/L70mm guns; 1 × 20 mm Phalanx CIWS; 2 × triple Mark 32 ASW torpedo tubes with Mark 46 anti-submarine torpedoes
- Aircraft carried: Sikorsky S-70C-1/2
- Aviation facilities: Hangar and helipad

ROCS Tzu I (子儀, PFG2-1107) is the fifth of eight Taiwanese-built Cheng Kung-class frigate, based on the Oliver Hazard Perry class.

== Construction and career ==
Laid down on 7 August 1994 and launched on 13 July 1995, Tzu I was commissioned in service in January 1997. The Cheng Kung-class frigates have the same length as the later Oliver Hazard Perry frigates, but have a different weapon and electronics fit.

Like her sister ships, Tzu I was built under license by China SB Corp. at Kaohsiung City, Taiwan, ROC.

As of 2005, Tzu I is homeported at Tso-Ying naval base.

== Gallery ==
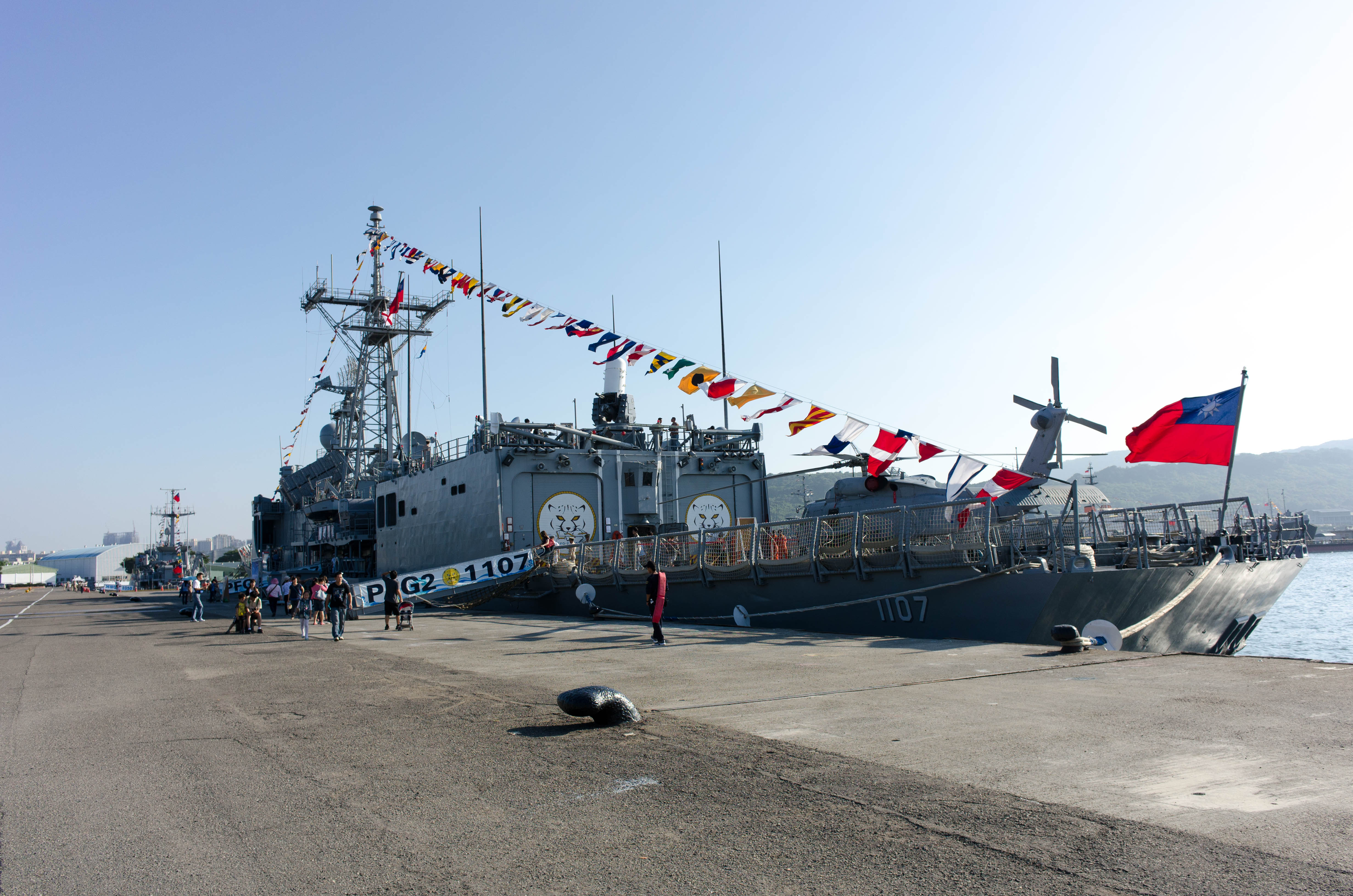
ROCS Tzu I's aft

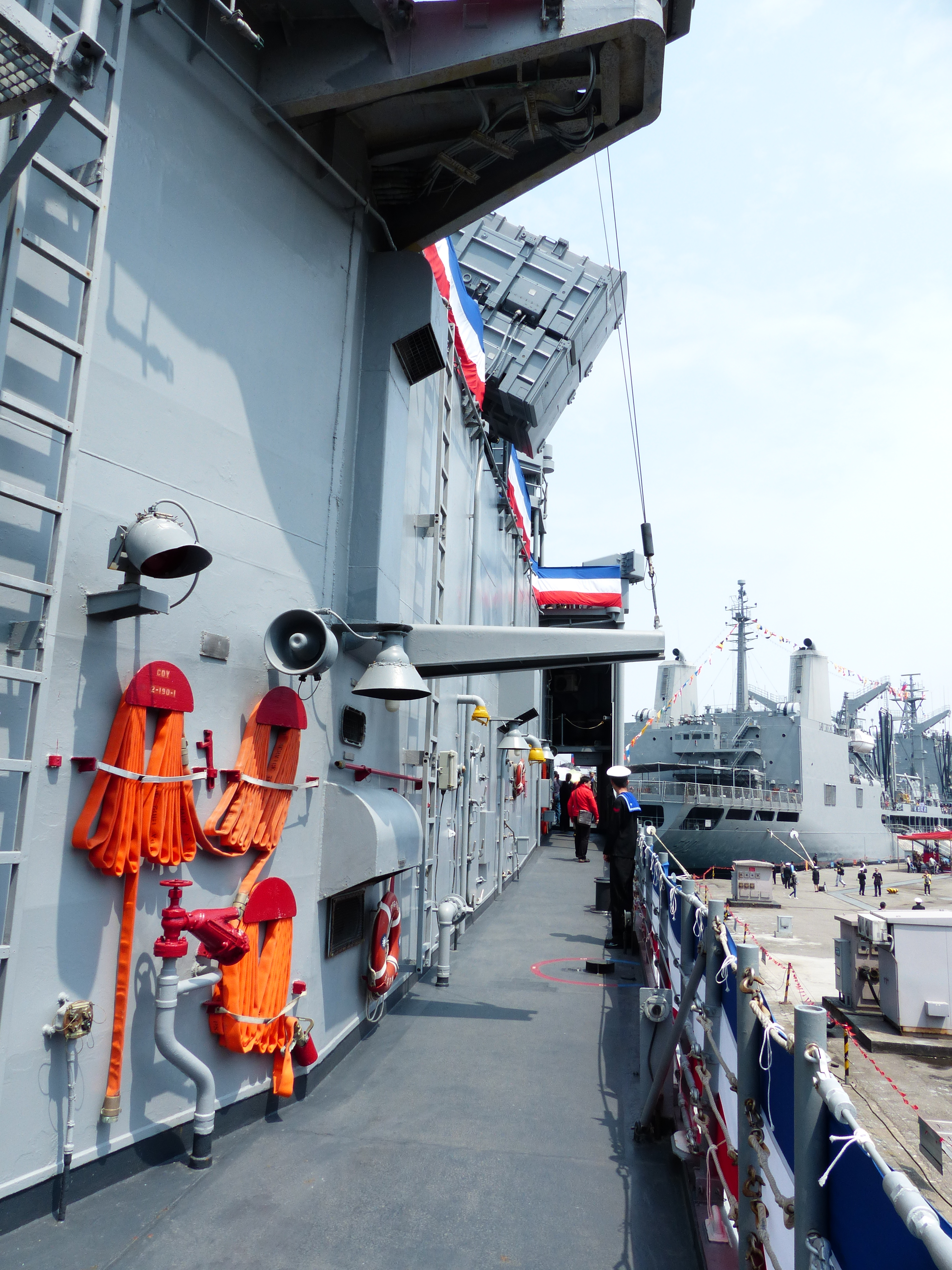
ROCS Tzu I's bell

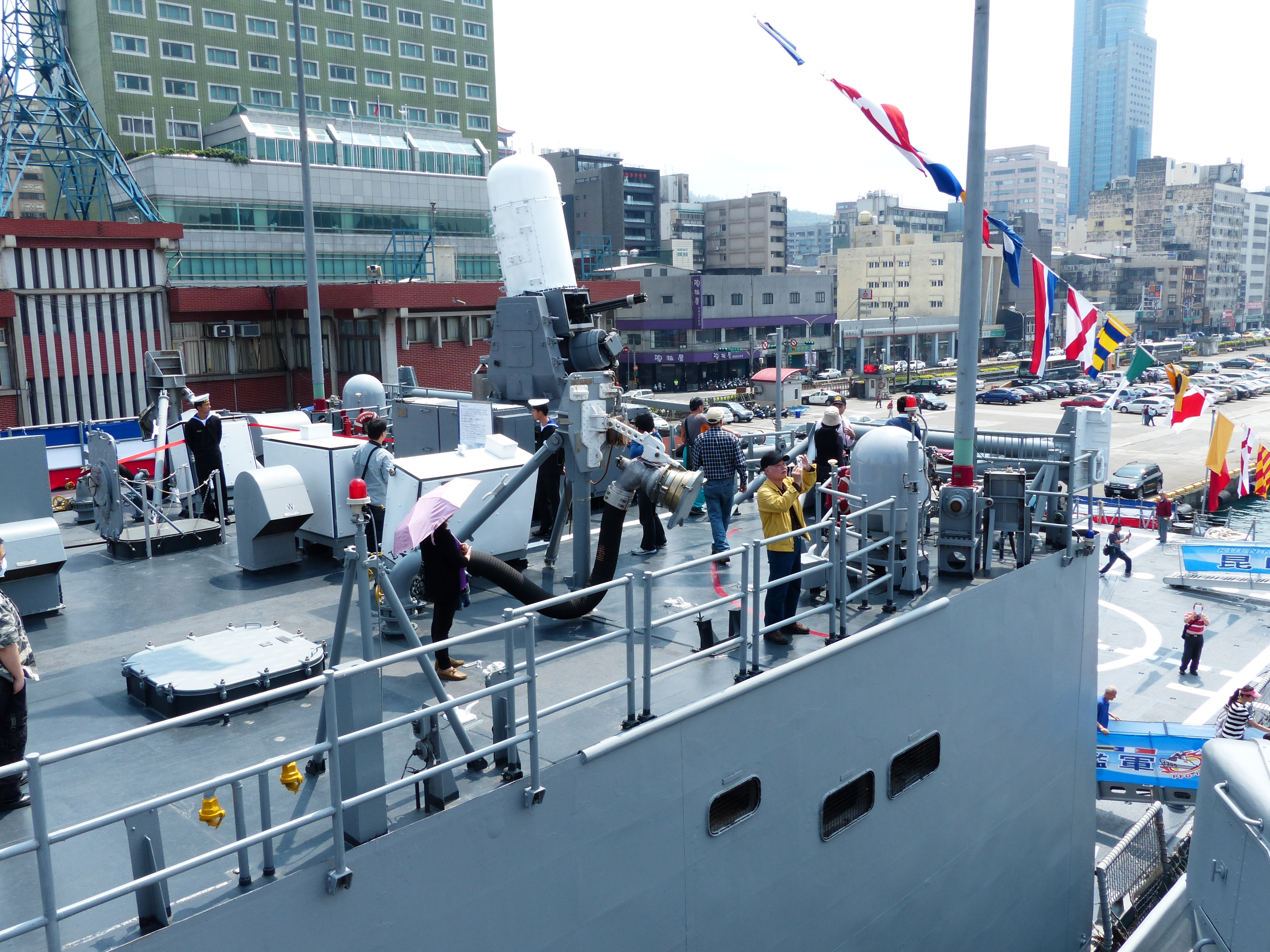
ROCS Tzu I's Phalanx CIWS

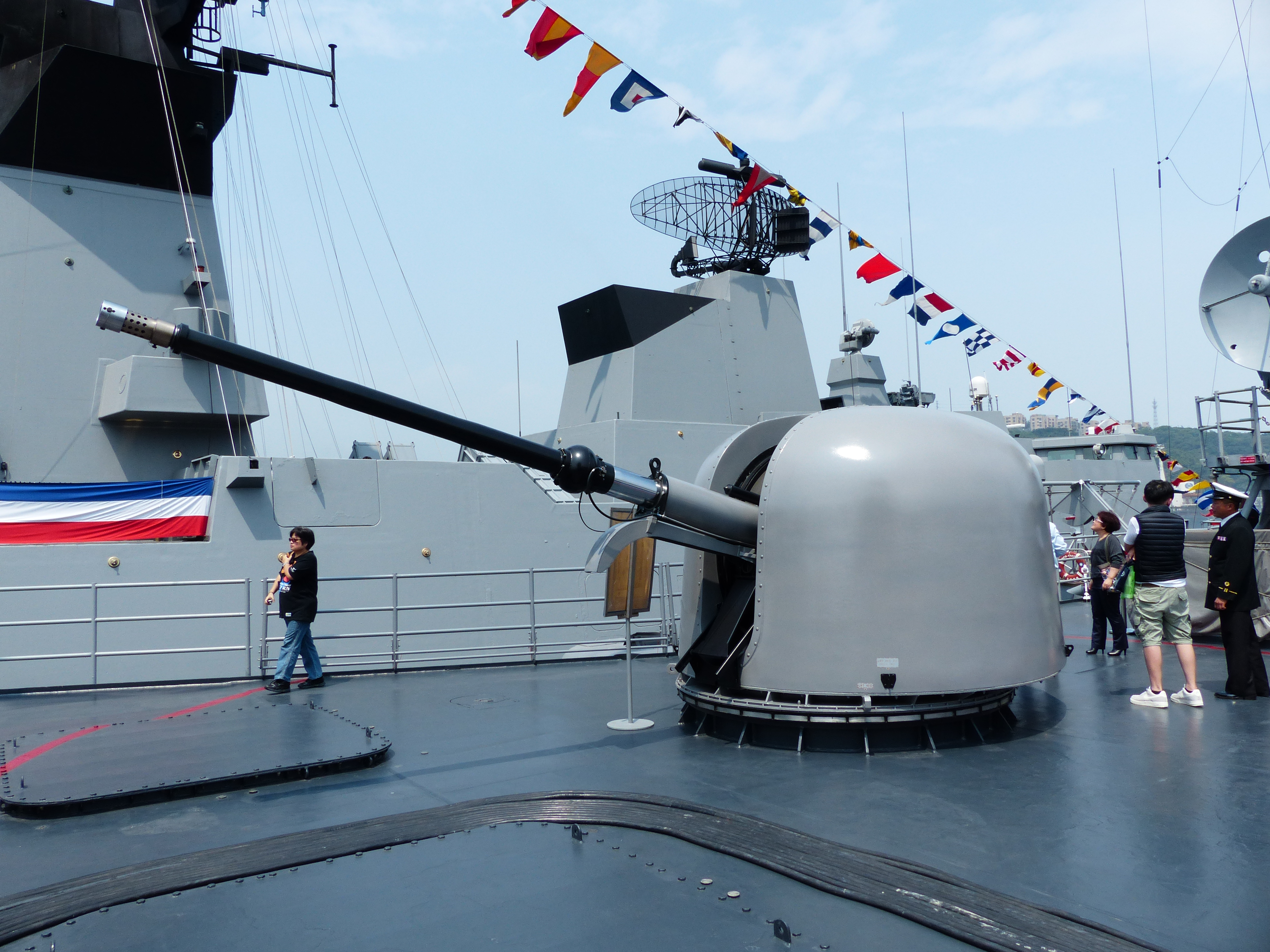
ROCS Tzu I's OTO Melara 76mm gun

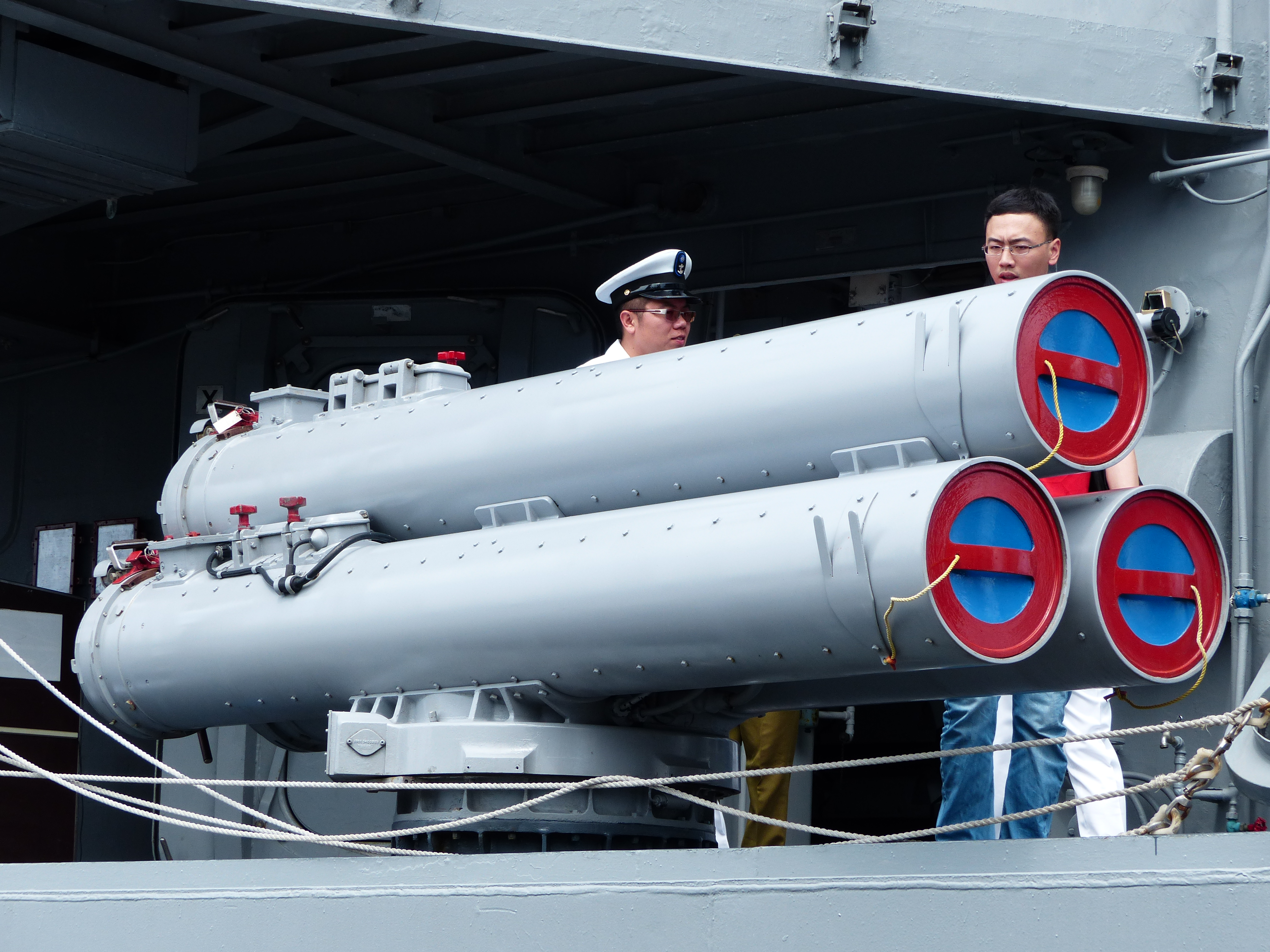
ROCS Tzu I's Mark 32 torpedo tubes

== See also ==
- ROCS Cheng Ho (PFG2-1103)
- ROCS Chi Kuang (PFG2-1105)
- ROCS Pan Chao (PFG2-1108)
- ROCS Chang Chien (PFG2-1109)
- ROCS Tian Dan (PFG2-1110)
