= ROCS Si Ning =

Republic of China frigate

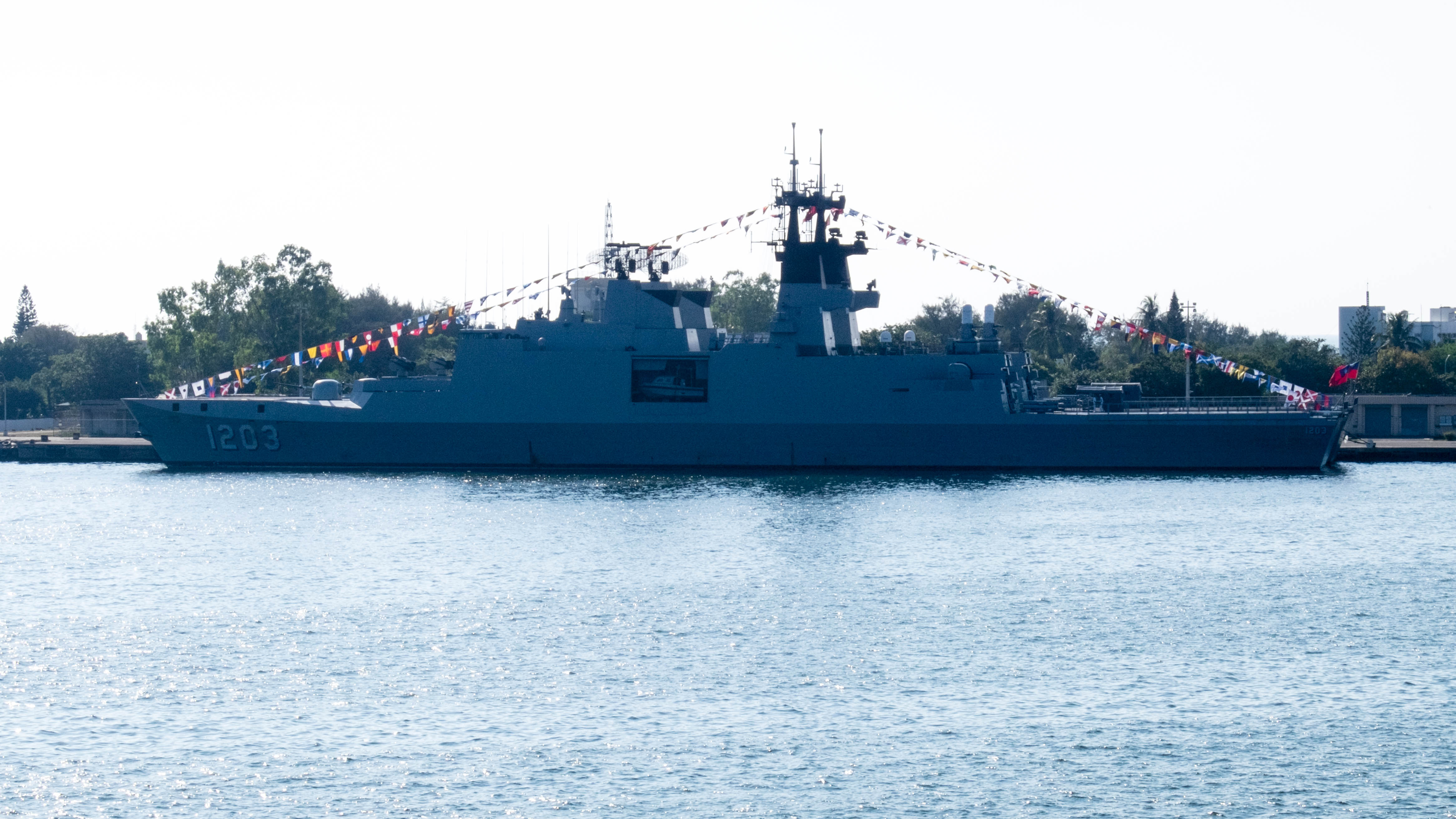
- ROCS Si Ning at Zuoying Naval Base on 23 November 2014

History

Taiwan
- Name: Si Ning; (西寧)
- Namesake: Si Ning
- Builder: DCNS, Lorient
- Laid down: 14 March 1994
- Launched: 5 November 1994
- Acquired: 1996
- Commissioned: 5 October 1996
- Home port: Zuoying
- Identification: Pennant number: PFG-1203
- Status: Active

General characteristics
- Class & type: Kang Ding-class frigate
- Displacement: 3,200 tonnes, 3,800 tonnes fully loaded
- Length: 125 m (410 ft)
- Beam: 15.4 m (51 ft)
- Draught: 4.1 m (13 ft)
- Propulsion: 4 diesel SEMT Pielstick 12PA6V280 STC2, 21,000 hp (16,000 kW)
- Speed: 25 kn (46 km/h; 29 mph)
- Range: 4,000 nmi (7,400 km; 4,600 mi) at 15 kn (28 km/h; 17 mph); 9,000 nmi (17,000 km; 10,000 mi) at 12 kn (22 km/h; 14 mph)
- Endurance: 50 days of food
- Boats & landing craft carried: 2 × ETN boats
- Capacity: 350 tonnes of fuel, 80 m³ of kerosene, 60 tonnes of potable water
- Complement: 12 officers; 68 petty officers; 61 men
- Sensors & processing systems: 1 × CastorII fire control radar; 1 x DRBV-26D Jupiter-II two-dimensional air search radar; 1 x Poseidon Triton G search radar; Najir photoelectric director; Alose Sonar System
- Armament: Anti-ship; 8 × Hsiung Feng II anti-ship missiles; 1 x MIM-72 Chaparral; 2 x Mark 32 Surface Vessel Torpedo Tubes; Guns; 1 × OTO Melara 76 mm; 2 × Bofors 40 mm L70 guns; CIWS; 1 × Phalanx CIWS
- Armour: On sensitive areas (munition magazine and control centre)
- Aircraft carried: 1 × Sikorsky S-70C (M)
- Aviation facilities: Hangar and helipad

ROCS Si Ning (PFG-1203) (Chinese: 西寧; lit. 'Si Ning') is a Kang Ding-class frigate of the Republic of China Navy.

== Development and design ==
As the ROC (Taiwan)'s defensive stance is aimed towards the Taiwan Strait, the ROC Navy is constantly seeking to upgrade its anti-submarine warfare capabilities. The US$1.75 billion agreement with France in the early 1990s was an example of this procurement strategy, the six ships are configured for both ASW and surface attack. The Exocet was replaced by Taiwan-developed Hsiung Feng II anti-ship missile and the AAW weapon is the Sea Chaparral. The main gun is an Oto Melara 76 mm/62 mk 75 gun, similar to its Singaporean counterparts, the Formidable-class frigates. Some problems in the integration of Taiwanese and French systems had been reported. The frigate carries a single Sikorsky S-70C(M)-1/2 ASW helicopter.

The Sea Chaparral SAM system is considered inadequate for defense against aircraft and anti-ship missiles, so the ROC (Taiwan) Navy plans to upgrade its air-defense capabilities with the indigenous TC-2N in 2020. The missiles will be quad-packed in a vertical launch system for future ROCN surface combatants, but a less-risky alternative arrangement of above-deck, fixed oblique launchers is seen as more likely for upgrading these French-built frigates.

== Construction and career ==
Si Ning was launched on 5 November 1994 at the DCNS in Lorient. Commissioned on 5 October 1996.

In 2017, she participated in the annual Dunmu Voyage Training Detachment of the Republic of China Navy. ROCS Pan Shi warship served as the flagship for Si Ning and ROCS Zhang Qian warships. From February 25 to March 14, they visited Kaohsiung, Anping, Magong, Taichung, and Keelung, Suao, Hualien and other ports are open for public visits. For the first time, the head of state will see off in person. Cheering for the officers and soldiers who are about to go abroad to promote the relief of overseas Chinese and the team led by Major General Jiang Zhengguo visited the Solomon Islands, Marshall Islands, Kiribati and Palau during the period.

On 4 August 2018, Tang Huosheng, deputy chief executive of the Central Joint Service Center of the Executive Yuan, led a visit the Si Ning.

On 22 March 2019, the National Defense Intellectual Tour and the Dunkin Good-Neighborly Open Tour, Si Ning warship berthed at Taipei Port for the first time which she arrived on 21 March.

On January 16, 2021, when the Xining warship was out of port for a mission in the early morning, the left blade hit an unidentified underwater object. The Navy immediately arranged for the Xining ship to return to the port safely for berthing. After inspection, only the left blade was damaged, and the rest of the personnel and equipment were normal. After the damaged blades of the Xining warship were inspected and replaced by the Navy itself, it can resume combat readiness, which will not affect the fleet's manpower deployment and combat readiness mission execution. The Navy recently issued a notice of winning the bid for the procurement of the left car blade assembly required for maintenance. The Navy Zuoying Logistics Support Command purchased the left car blade assembly from outside. The bid stated that an emergency occurred on the 16th of last month and the purchase was approved on the same day, so a budget of 46.09185 million yuan was compiled. Finally, Sunrise won the bid and must deliver the goods to the Navy before February 21, 2021.

== Gallery ==
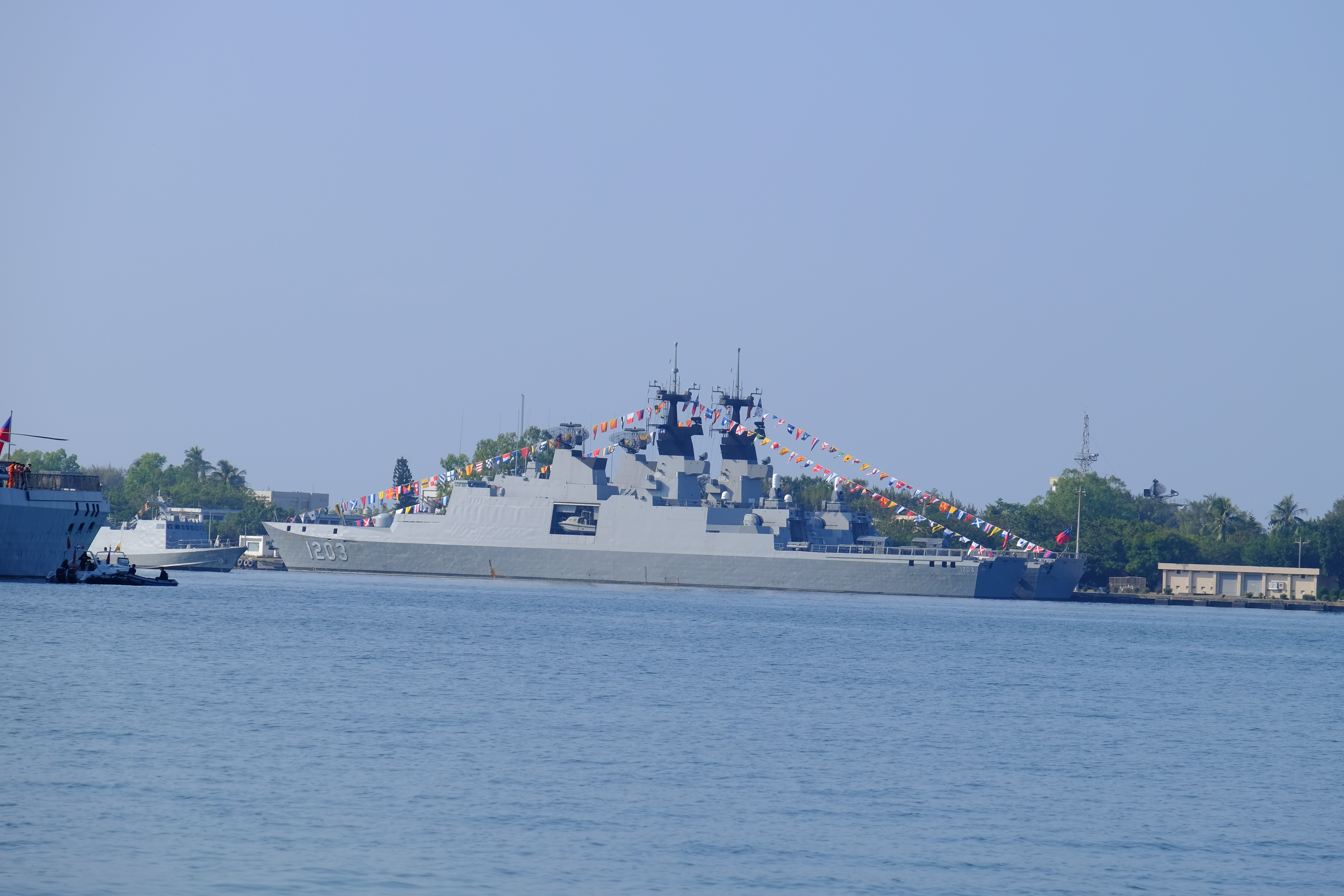
ROCS Si Ning at Zuoying Naval Base on 23 November 2014.

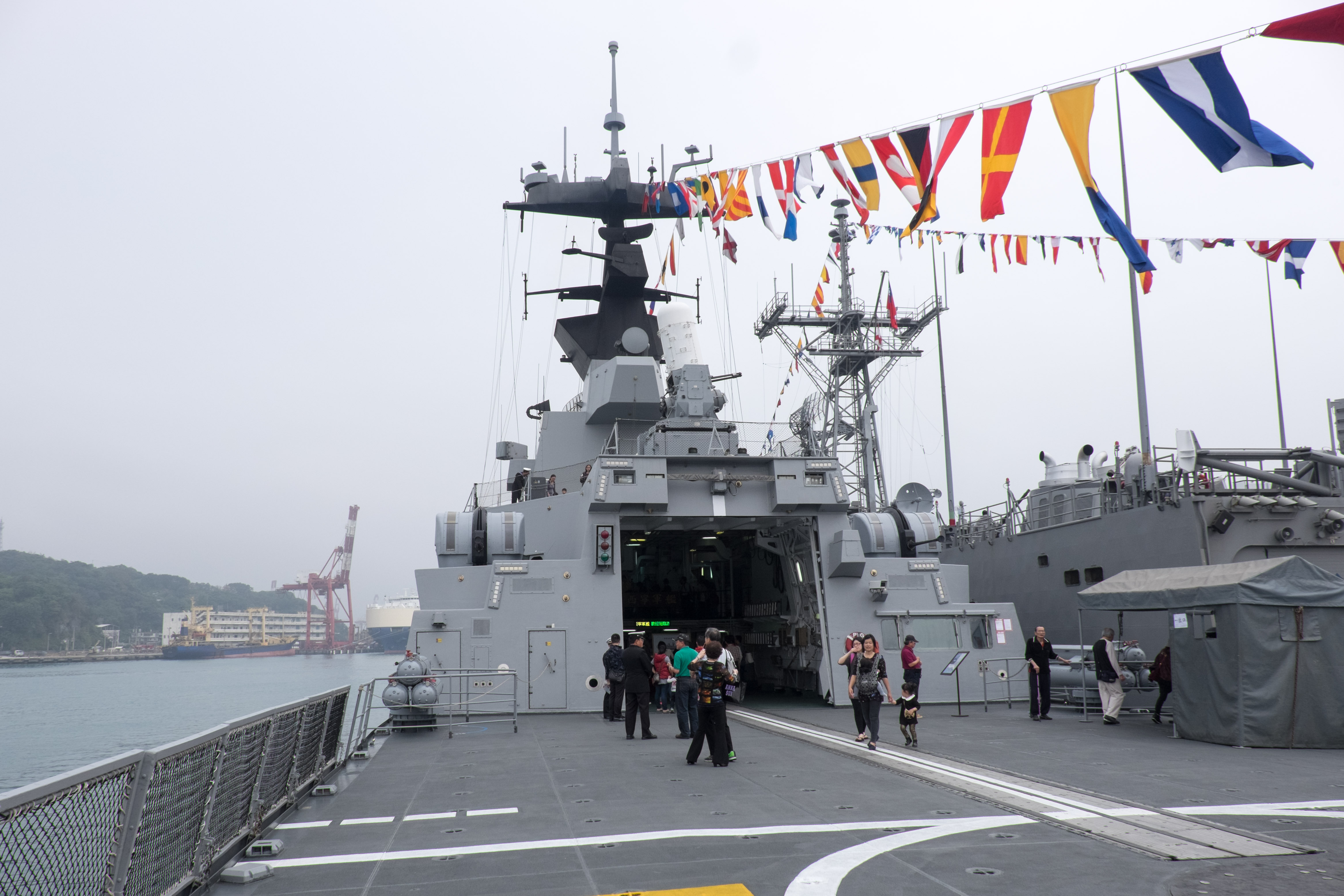
ROCS Si Ning's helipad on 16 March 2015.

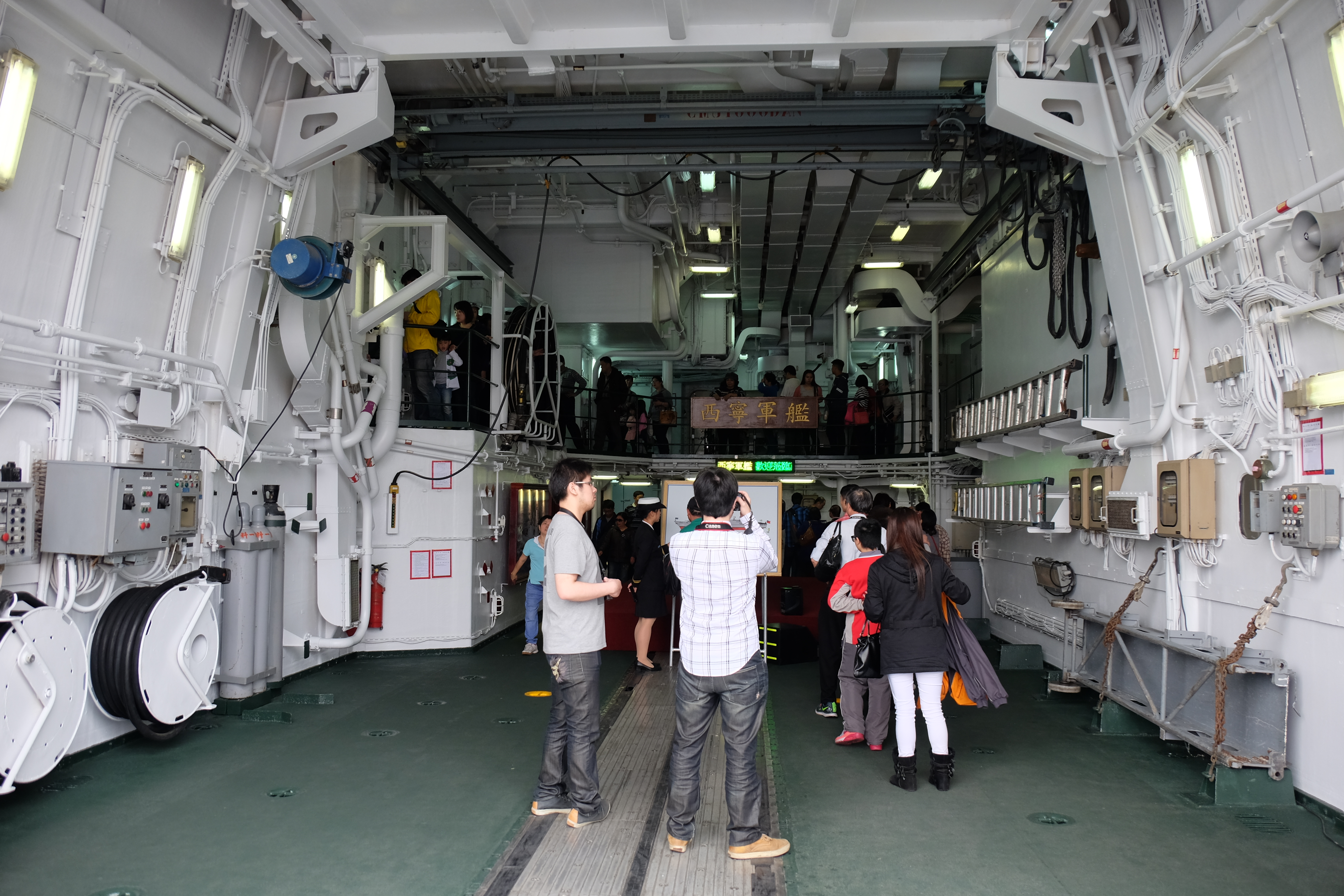
ROCS Si Ning's hangar on 16 March 2015.

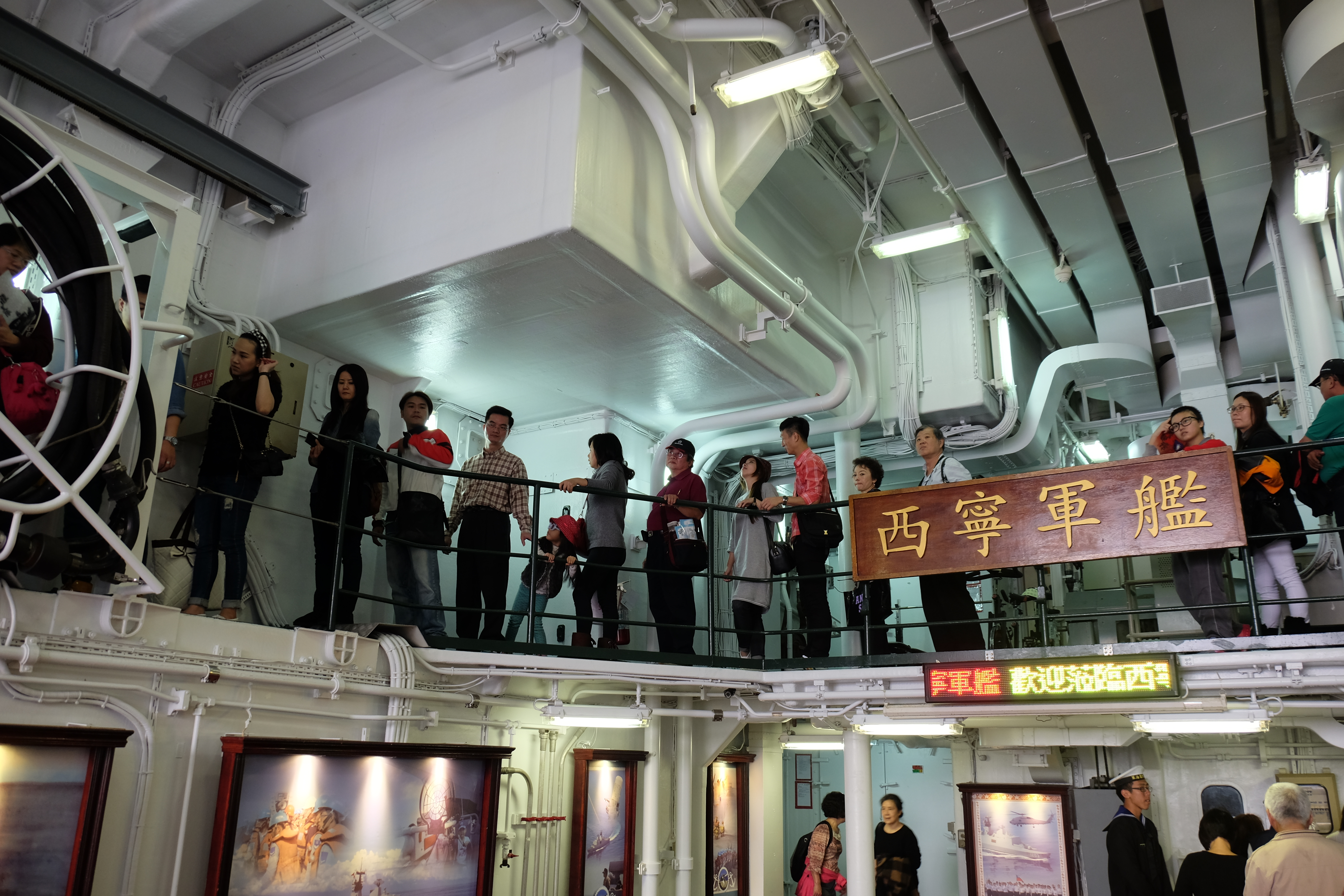
ROCS Si Ning's hangar on 16 March 2015.

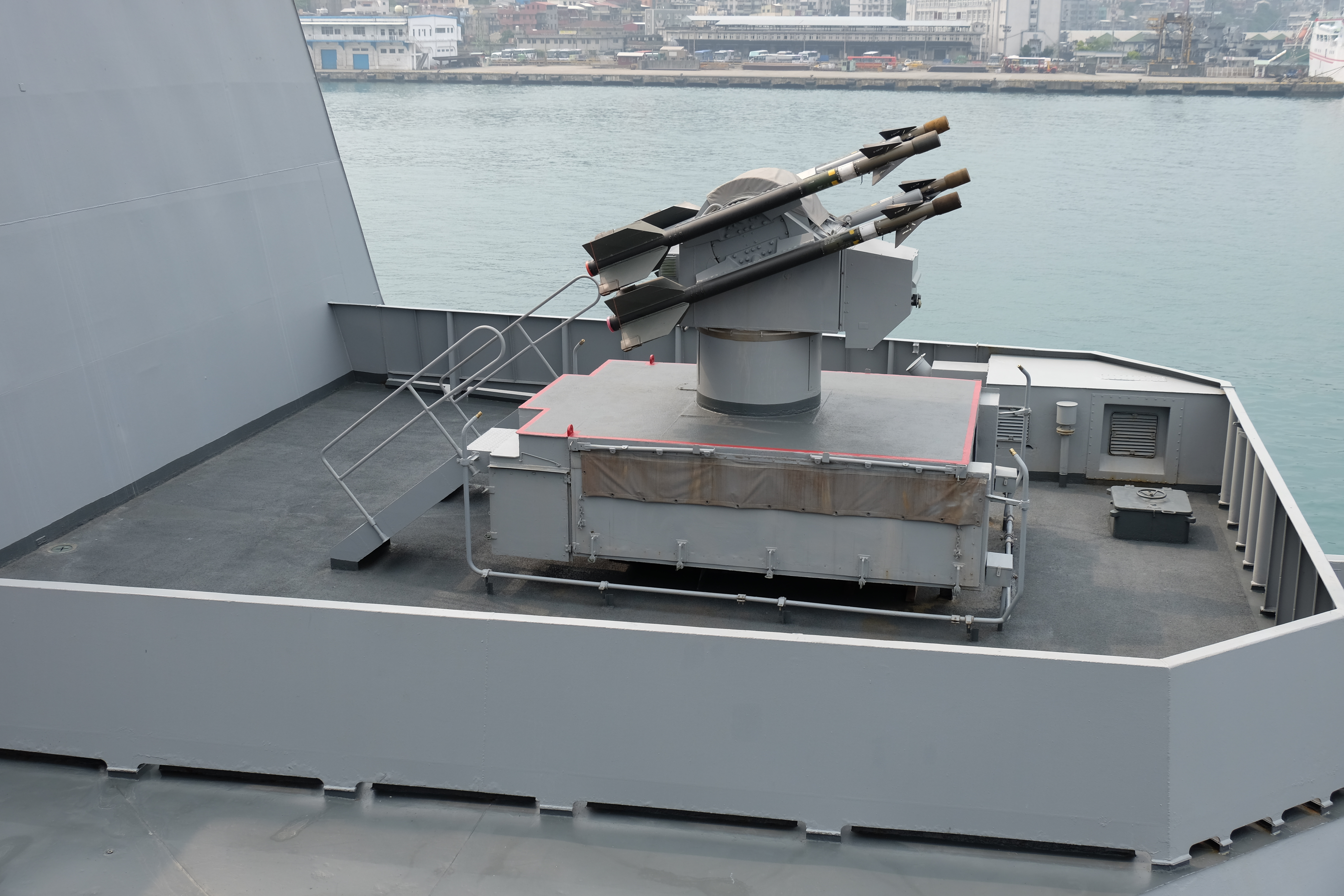
ROCS Si Ning's MIM-72C on 16 March 2015.

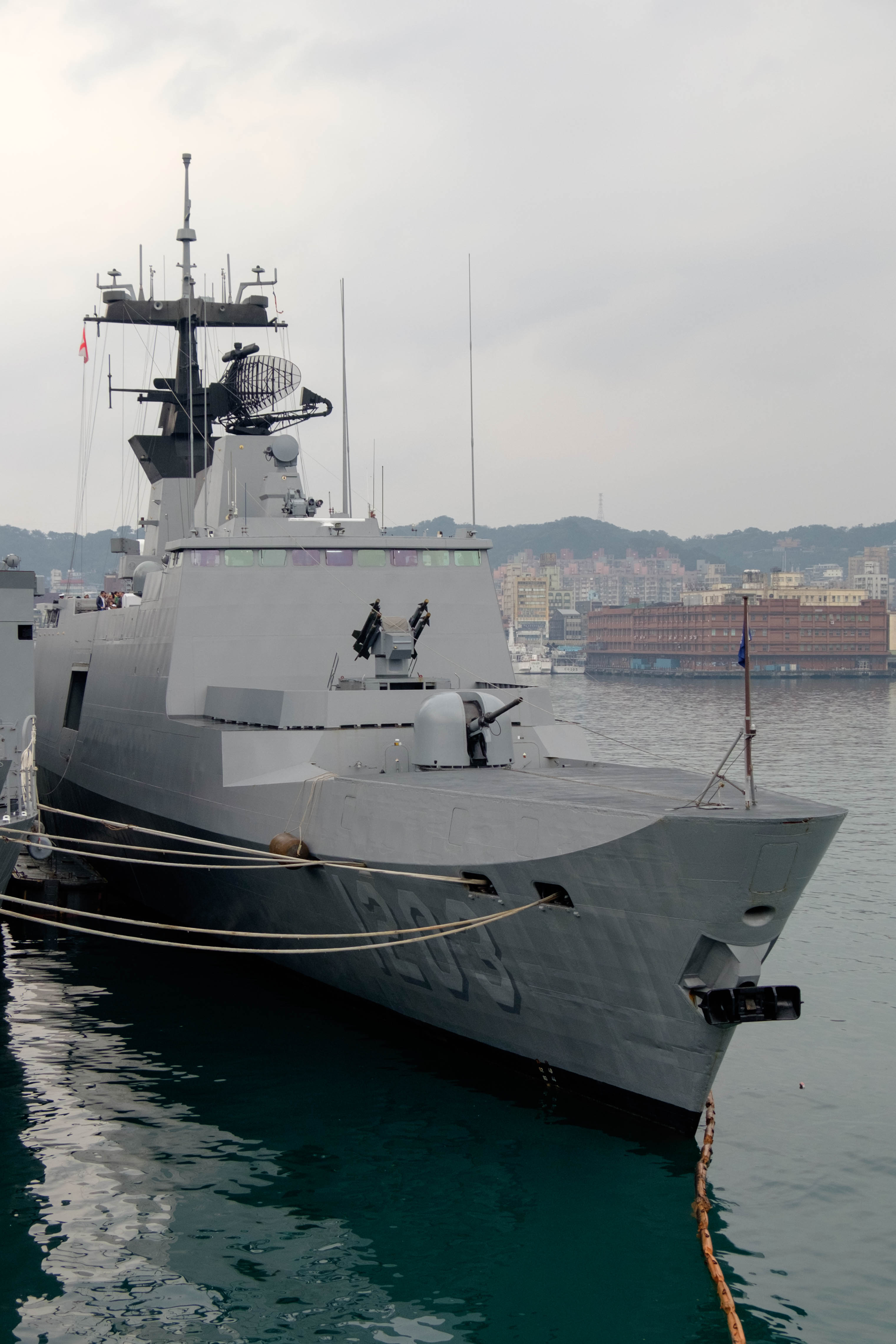
ROCS Si Ning at Keelung Naval Base on 9 March 2017.
