= ROCS Pan Chao =

Cheng Kung-class frigates

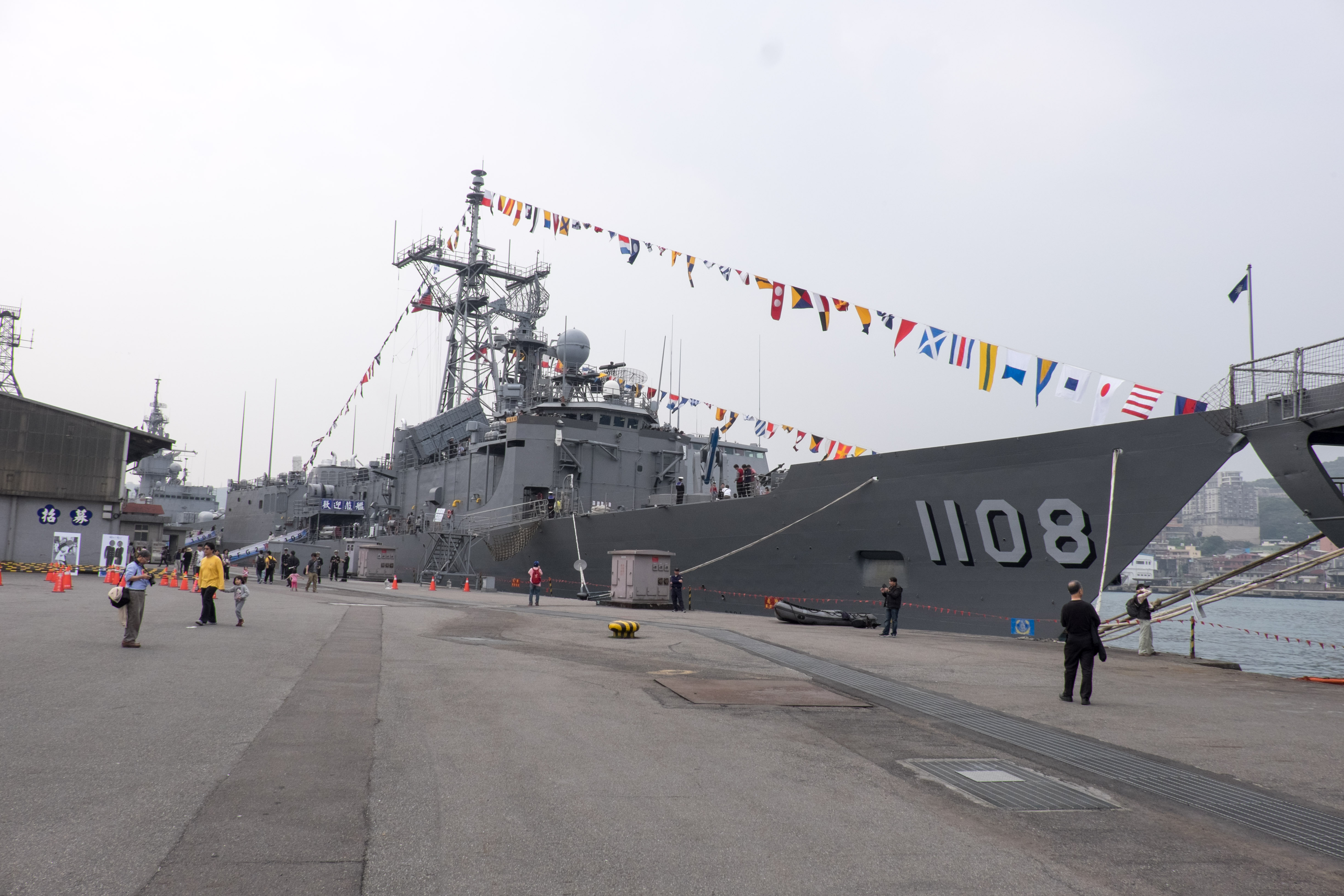
- ROCS Pan Chao on 16 March 2015

History

Republic of China
- Name: Pan Chao; (班超)
- Namesake: Ban Chao
- Builder: China Shipbuilding Corp., Kaohsiung
- Laid down: 25 July 1995
- Launched: 3 July 1997
- Commissioned: 16 December 1997
- Identification: Pennant number: PFGS-1108
- Status: in active service

General characteristics
- Class & type: Cheng Kung-class frigate
- Displacement: 4,103 long tons (4,169 t) full
- Length: 453 ft (138 m)
- Beam: 46.95 ft (14.31 m)
- Installed power: 40,000 shp total
- Propulsion: General Electric LM2500-30 gas turbines,
- Speed: 29 knots
- Complement: 18 officers; 180 enlisted; 19 flight crew
- Sensors & processing systems: AN/SPS-49 air-search radar; AN/SPS-55 surface-search radar; CAS, STIR gun fire control radar; SQS-56 sonar
- Electronic warfare & decoys: AN/SLQ-32(V)5; (AN/SLQ-32(V)2 + SIDEKICK)
- Armament: 40 × SM-1MR at Mk 13 Missile Launcher; 4 × Hsiung Feng II and 4 HF-3 supersonic AShM; 1 × OTO Melara 76 mm naval gun; 2 × Bofors 40mm/L70mm guns; 1 × 20 mm Phalanx CIWS; 2 × triple Mark 32 ASW torpedo tubes with Mark 46 anti-submarine torpedoes
- Aircraft carried: Sikorsky S-70C-1/2
- Aviation facilities: Hangar and helipad

ROCS Pan Chao (班超, PFG2-1108) is the sixth of eight Taiwanese-built Cheng Kung-class frigates of the Republic of China Navy, based on the United States Oliver Hazard Perry class.

== Construction and career ==
Laid down in July 1995 and launched in May 1996, Pan Chao was commissioned in December 1997. All of these Taiwanese frigates have the length of the later Oliver Hazard Perry-class frigates, but have a different weapon and electronics fit.

Like her sister ships, Pan Chao was built under license by China SB Corp. at Kaohsiung City, ROC.

On May 23, 2024, the Ministry of National Defense released footage of the ship monitoring the PLA's Type 052DShaoxing.

On February 26, 2025, the ship monitored the PLA's Type 071Simingshan and Type 903 Qiandao Lake in the southwest waters of Taiwan.

== Gallery ==
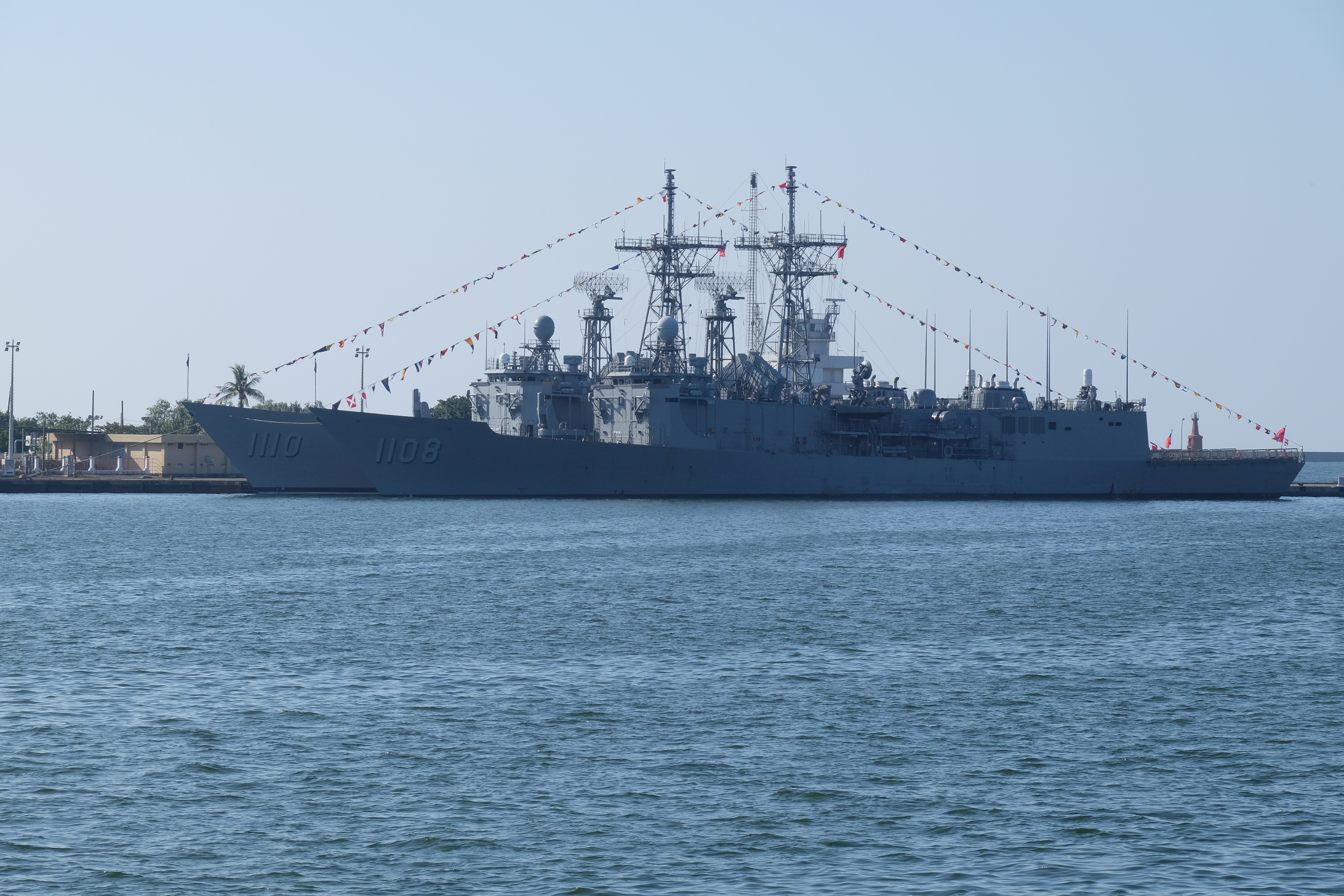
ROCS Pan Chao and ROCS Tian Dan on 23 November 2014

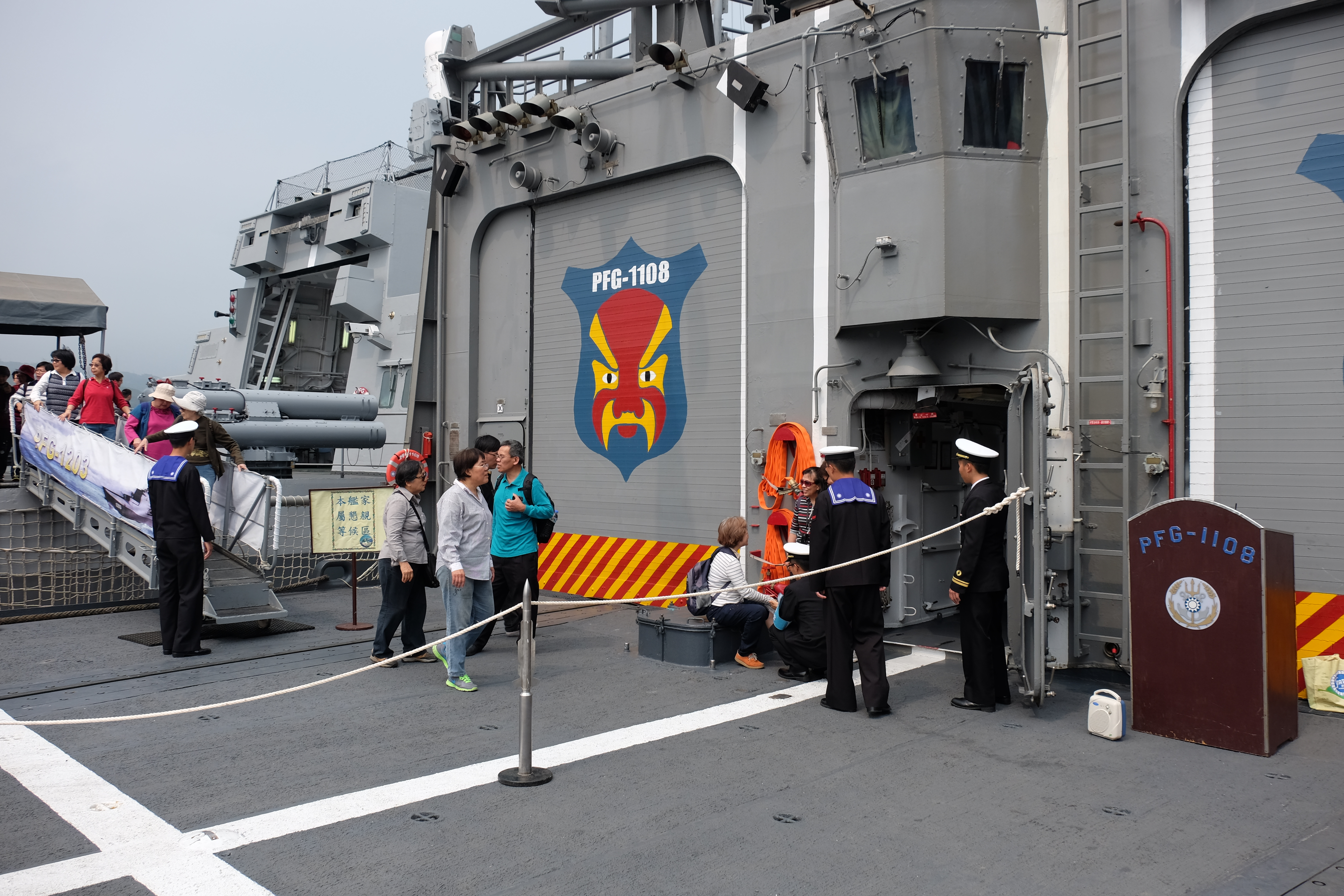
ROCS Pan Chao's hangar

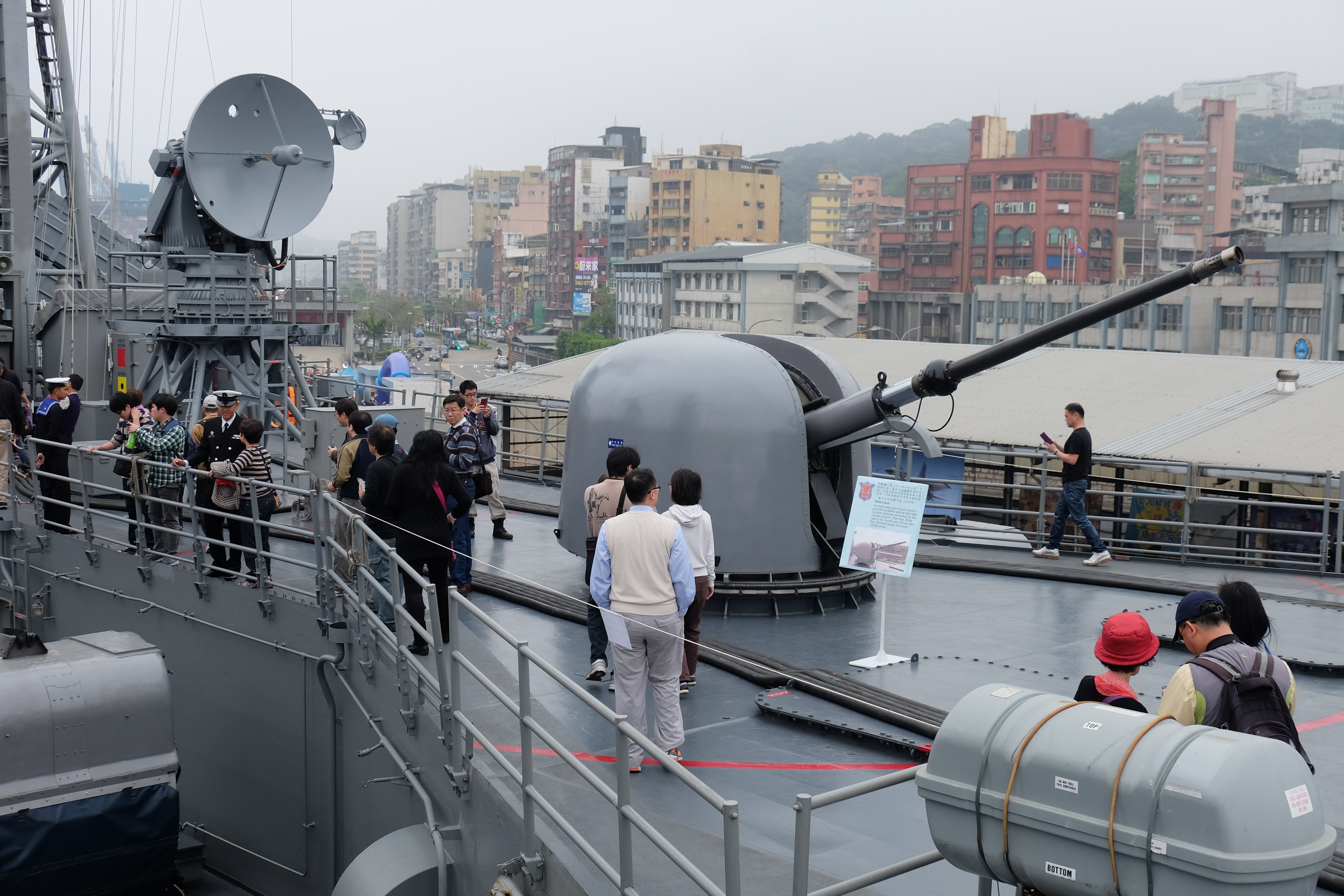
ROCS Pan Chao's OTO Melara 76mm gun

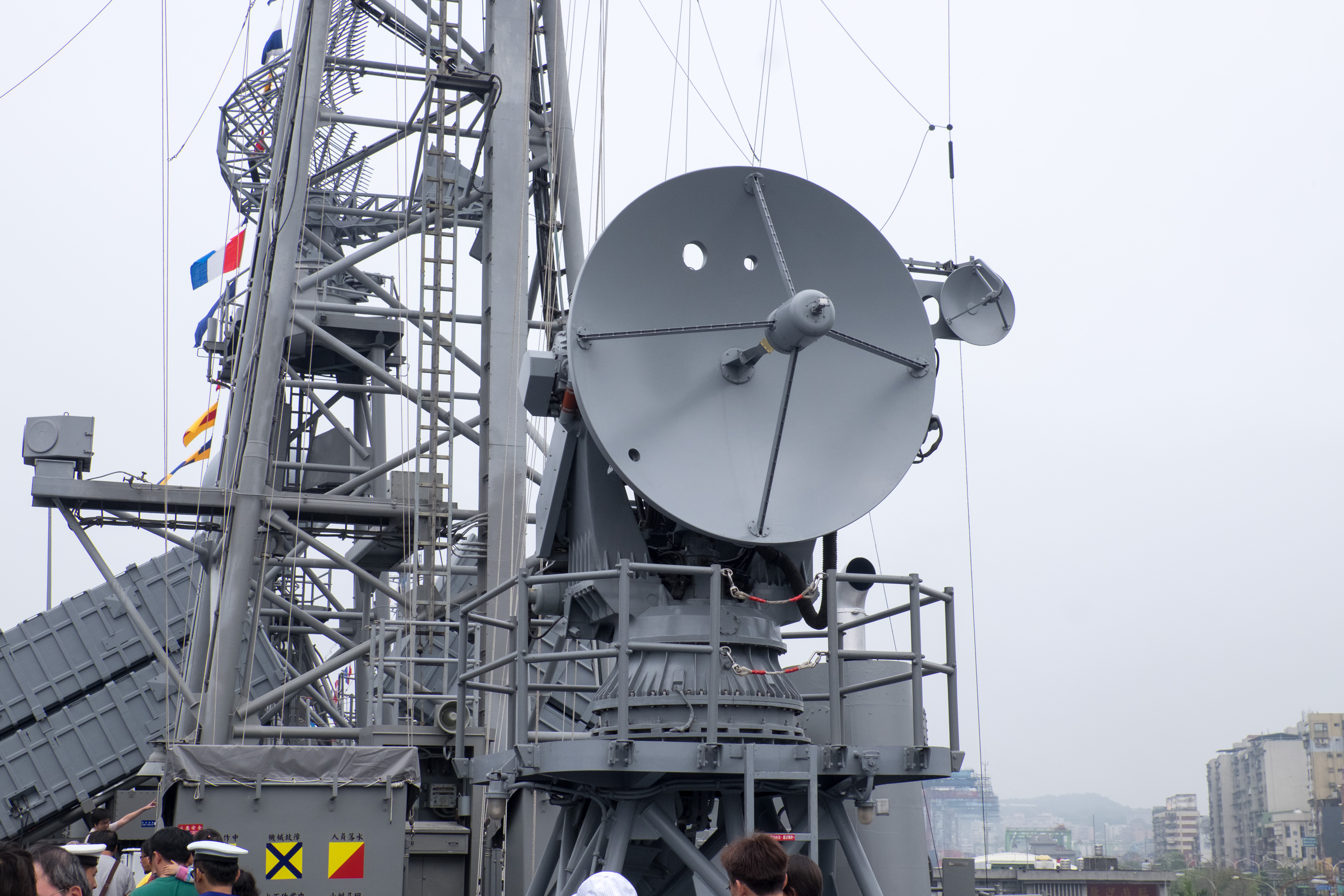
ROCS Pan Chao's Mark 92 Fire Control System

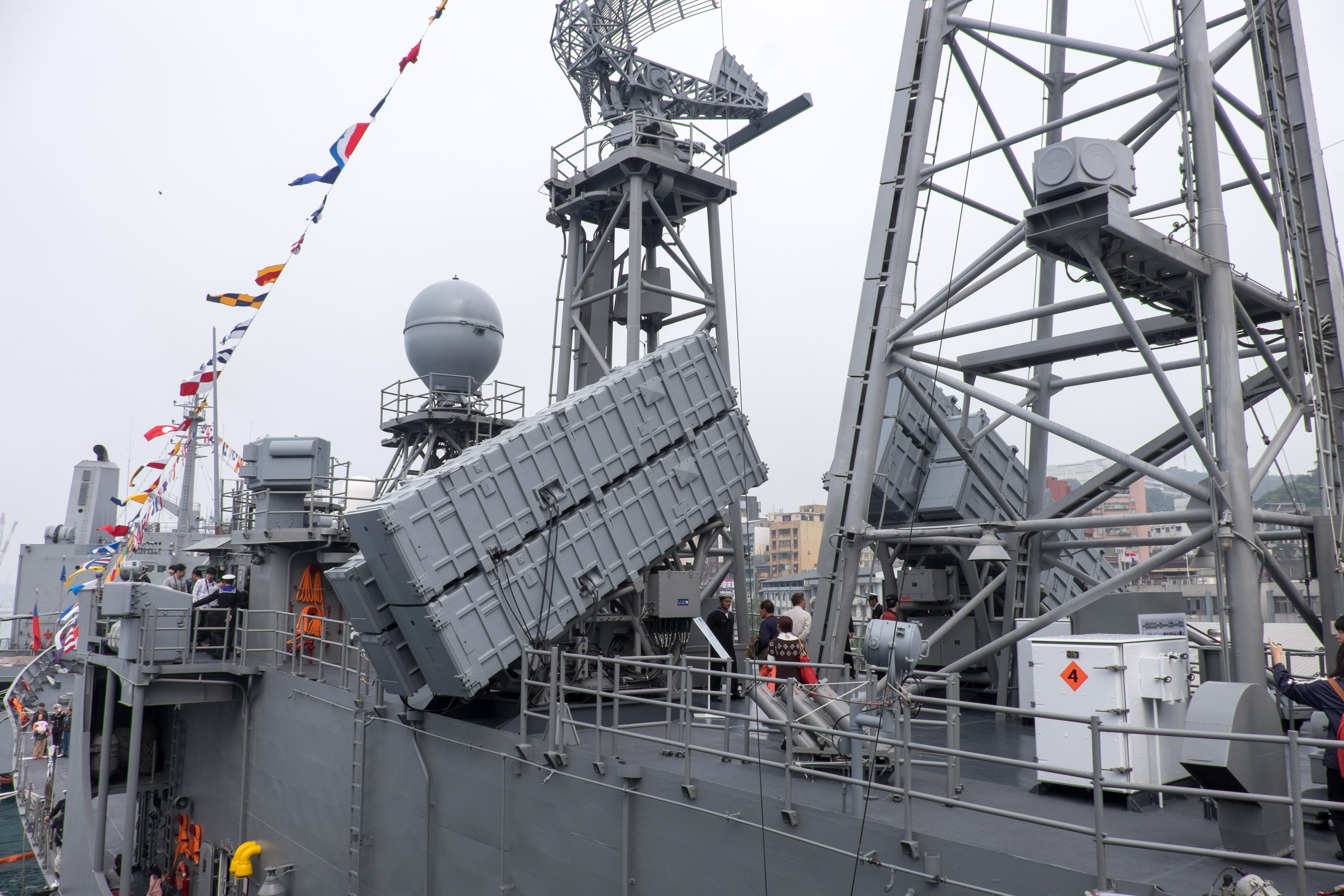
ROCS Pan Chao's Hsiung Feng II and Hsiung Feng III

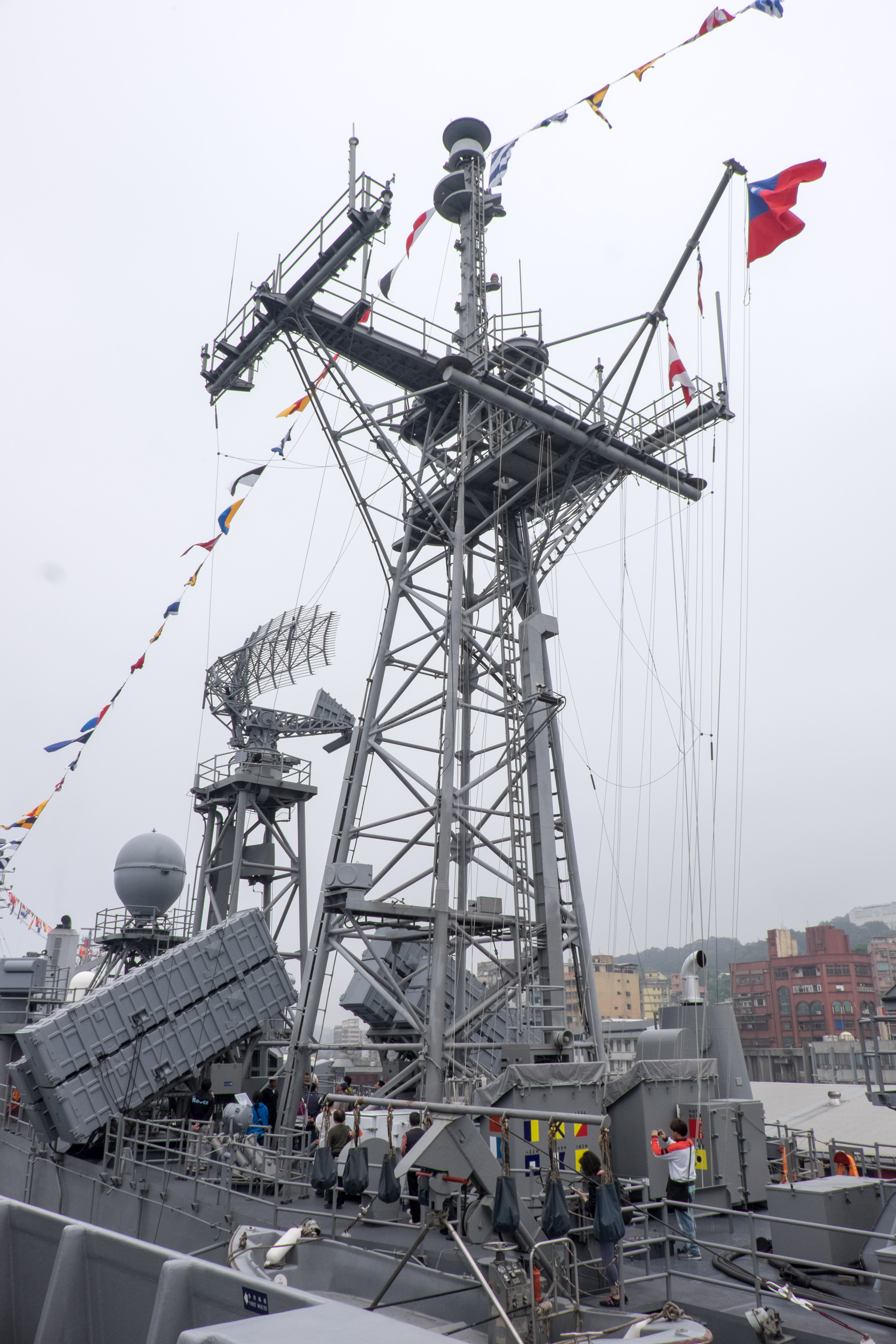
ROCS Pan Chao's main mast

== See also ==
- ROCS Cheng Ho (PFG2-1103)
- ROCS Chi Kuang (PFG2-1105)
- ROCS Tzu I (PFG2-1107)
- ROCS Chang Chien (PFG2-1109)
- ROCS Tian Dan (PFG2-1110)
