= ROCS Chang Chien =

Cheng Kung-class frigates

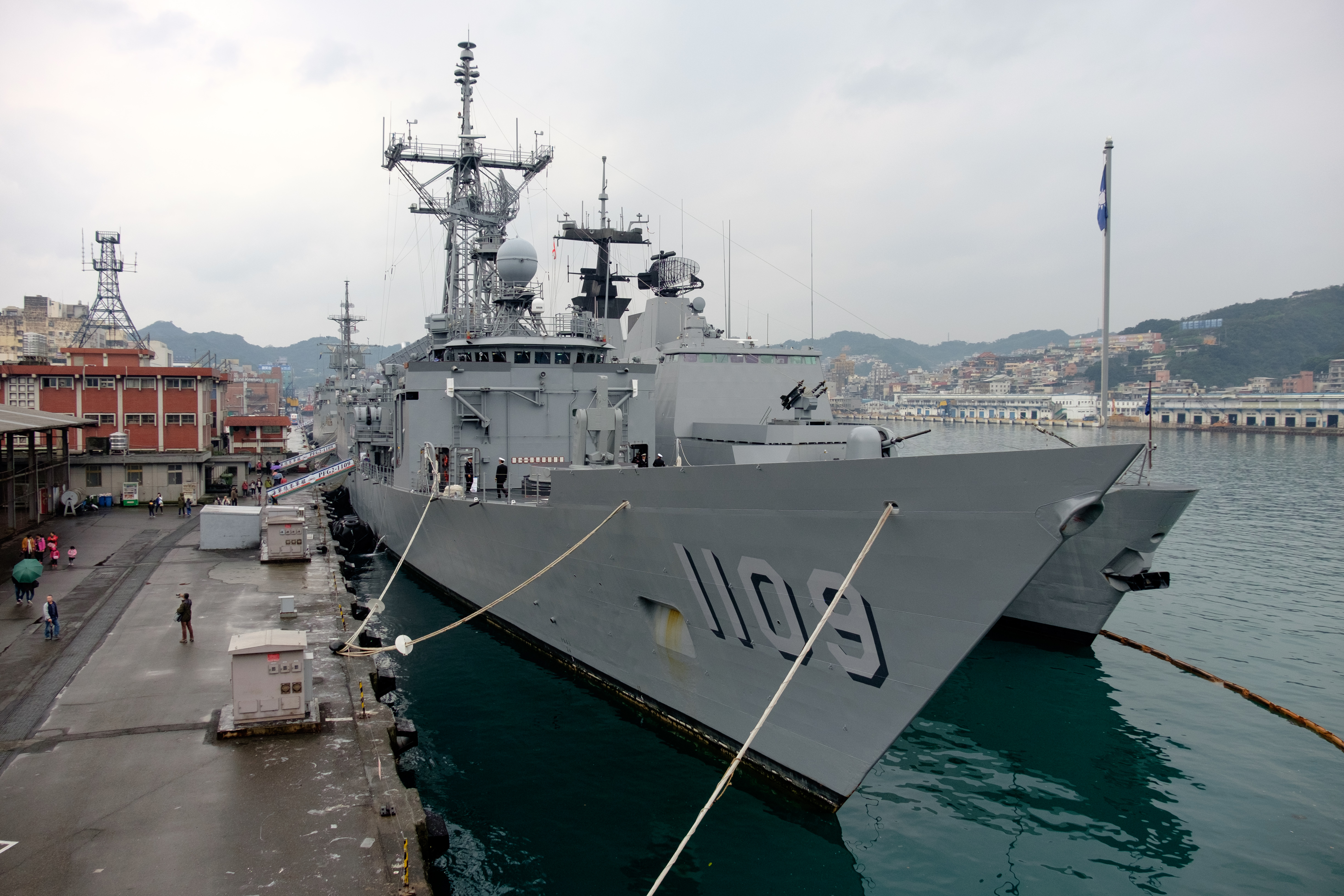
- ROCS Chang Chien and ROCS Si Ning on 9 March 2017

History

Taiwan
- Name: Chang Chien (張騫)
- Namesake: Chang Chien
- Builder: China Shipbuilding Corporation, Kaohsiung
- Laid down: 4 December 1995
- Launched: 14 May 1997
- Commissioned: 1 December 1998
- Home port: Tsoying
- Identification: Pennant number: PFG2-1109
- Status: in active service

General characteristics
- Class & type: Cheng Kung-class frigate
- Displacement: 4,103 long tons (4,169 t) full
- Length: 453 ft (138 m)
- Beam: 46.95 ft (14.31 m)
- Propulsion: General Electric LM2500-30 gas turbines, 40,000 shp total
- Speed: 29 knots
- Complement: 18 officers; 180 enlisted; 19 flight crew
- Sensors & processing systems: AN/SPS-49 air-search radar; AN/SPS-55 surface-search radar; CAS, STIR gun fire control radar; SQS-56 sonar
- Electronic warfare & decoys: AN/SLQ-32(V)5; (AN/SLQ-32(V)2 + SIDEKICK)
- Armament: 40 × SM-1MR at Mk 13 Missile Launcher; 4 × Hsiung Feng II and 4 HF-3 supersonic AShM; 1 × OTO Melara 76 mm naval gun; 2 × Bofors 40mm/L70mm guns; 1 × 20 mm Phalanx CIWS; 2 × triple Mark 32 ASW torpedo tubes with Mark 46 anti-submarine torpedoes
- Aircraft carried: Sikorsky S-70C-1/2
- Aviation facilities: Hangar and helipad

ROCS Chang Chien (張騫, PFG2-1109) is the seventh of eight Taiwanese-built Cheng Kung-class frigates based on the United States Oliver Hazard Perry class.

== Construction and career ==
Laid down in June 1996 and launched in April 1997, Chang Chien was commissioned in November, 1998. All of these Taiwanese frigates have the length of the later Oliver Hazard Perry-class vessels, but have a different weapon and electronics fit.

Like her sister ships, Chang Chien was built under license by China SB Corp. at Kaohsiung City, Taiwan, ROC.

As of 2005, Chang Chien is homeported at Tso-Ying naval base.

In 2025 the Chang Chien's 76mm gun failed during a live fire exercise with the barrel exploding. No one was injured in the accident.

== Namesake ==
Chang Chien is named after Chang Chien (張騫) (195 BCE – 114 BCE), who served as an emissary to the nation-states in today's Central Asia and later as a general for the Han dynasty. He was famous for not-giving up his emissary mission even when captured by Xiongnu and forced to live among them for many years. Chang Chien was also instrumental for eventual Han conquest and colonization of the region now known as Xinjiang.

== Gallery ==
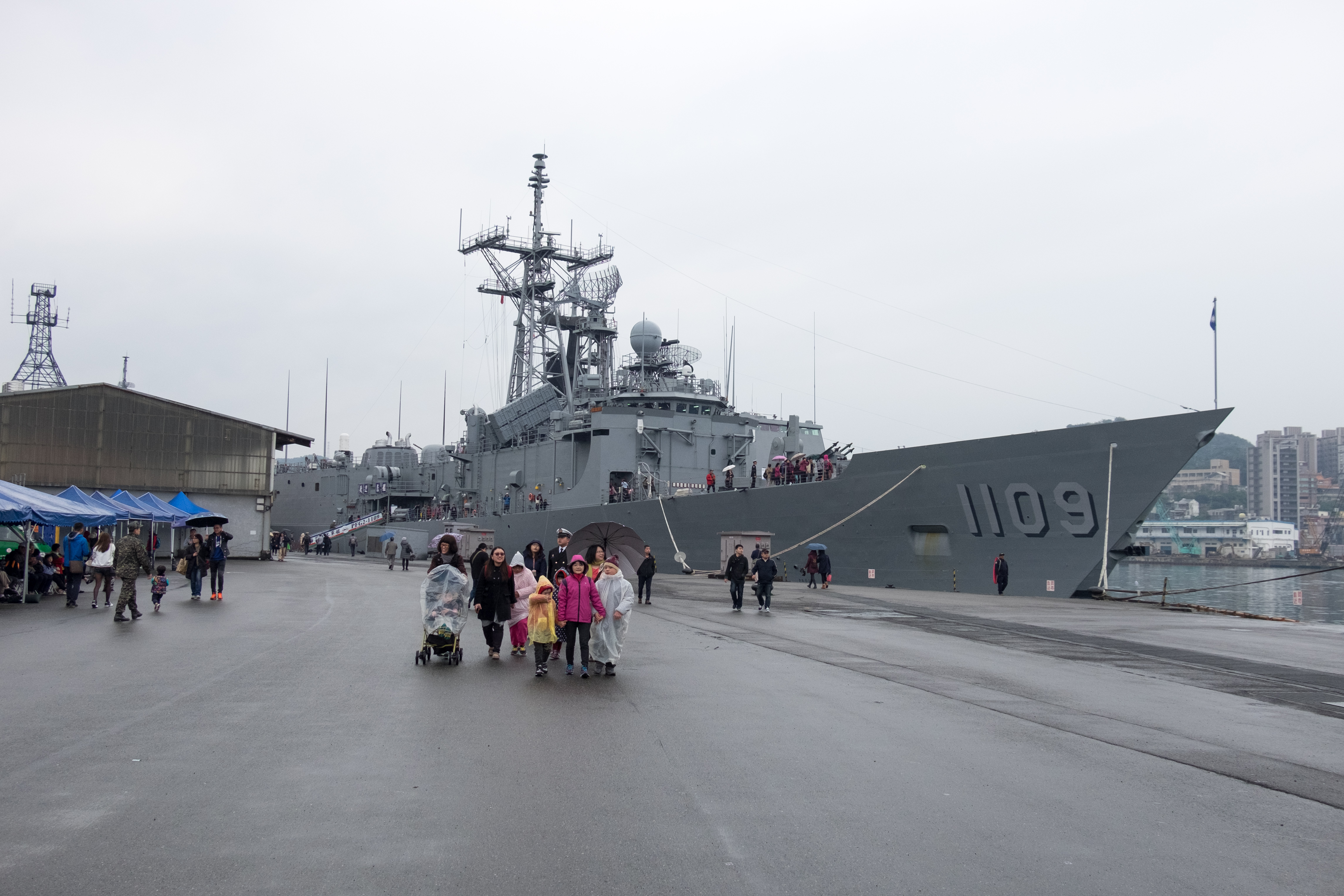
ROCS Chang Chien on 9 March 2017

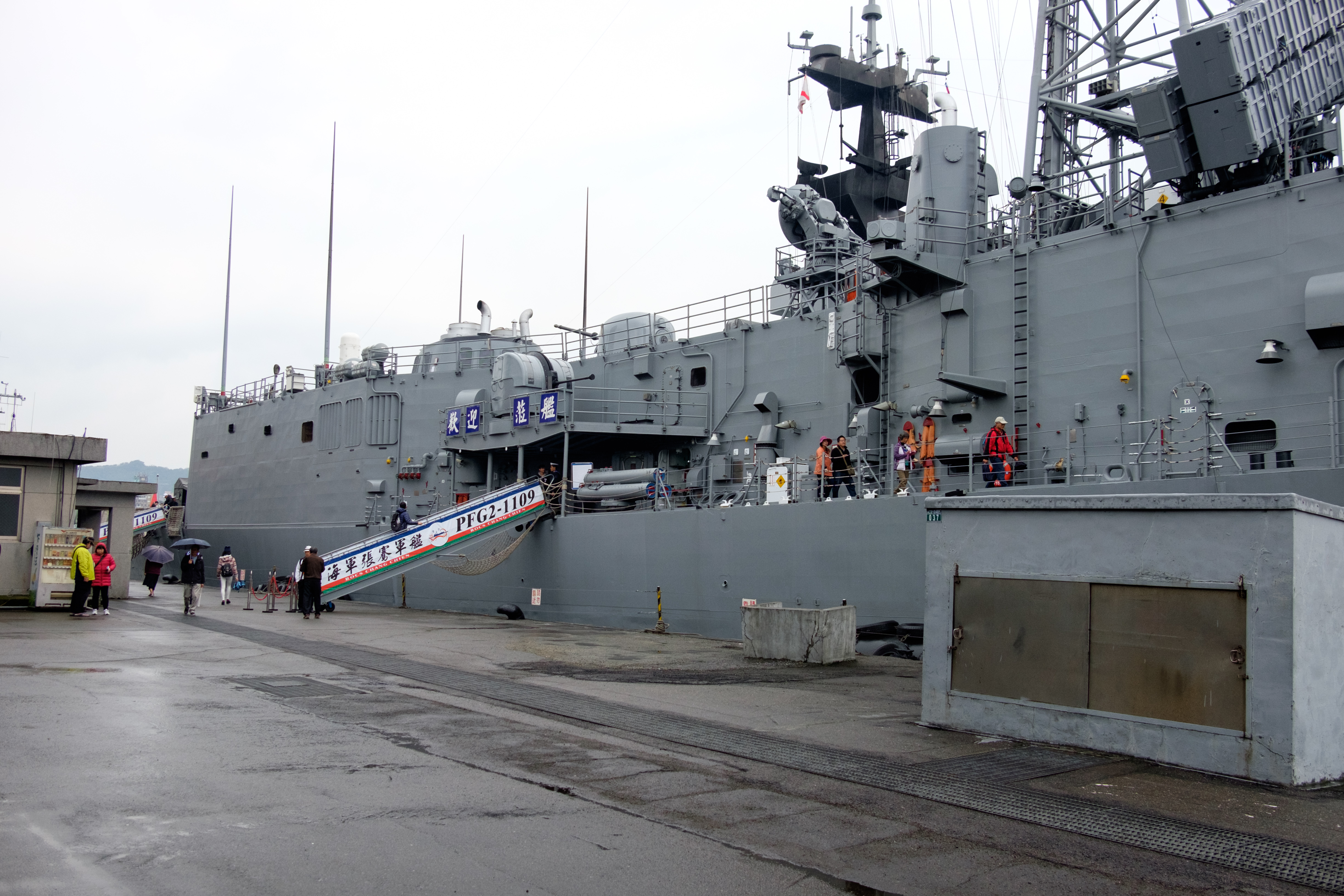
ROCS Chang Chien's midship

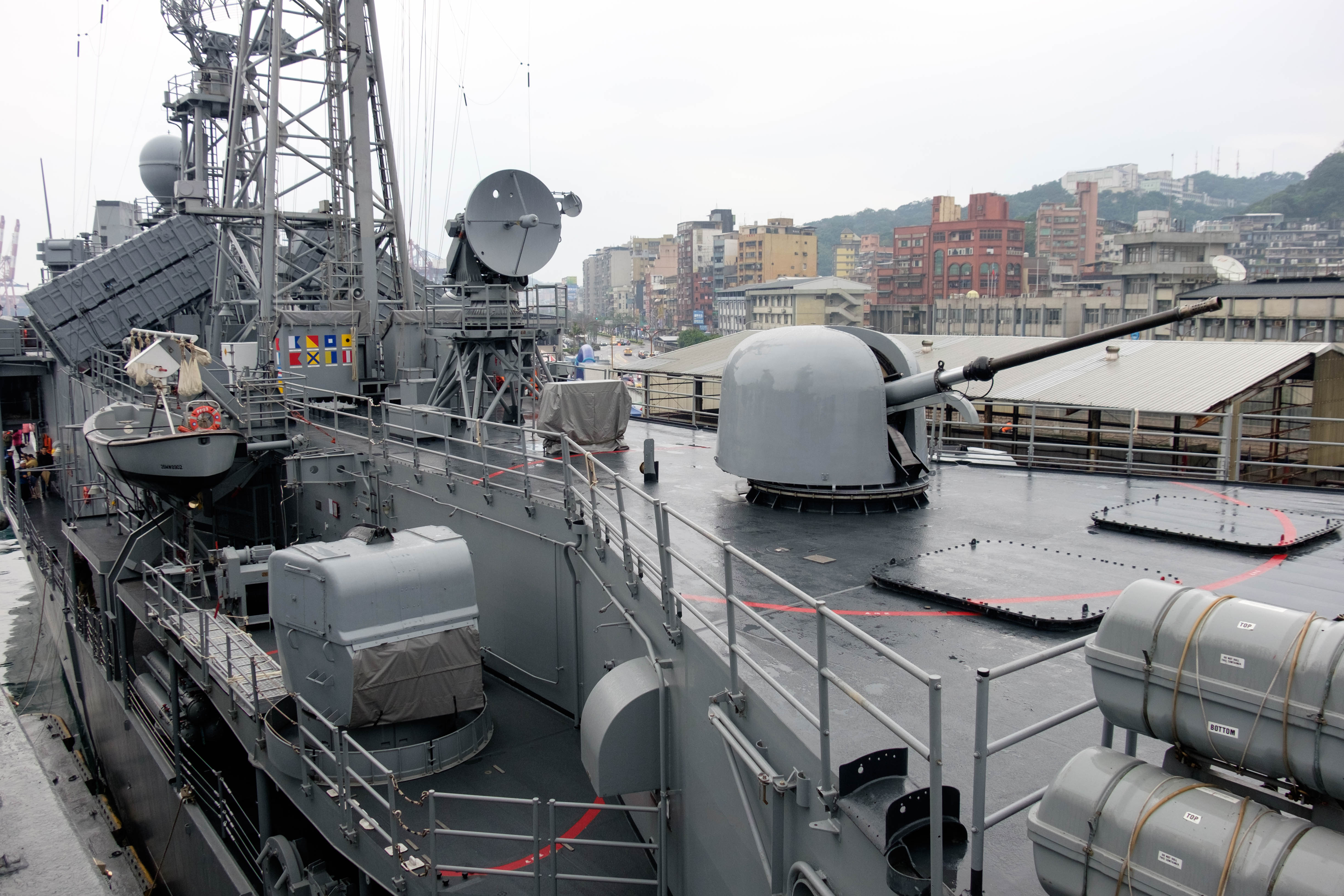
ROCS Chang Chien's OTO Melara 76mm gun

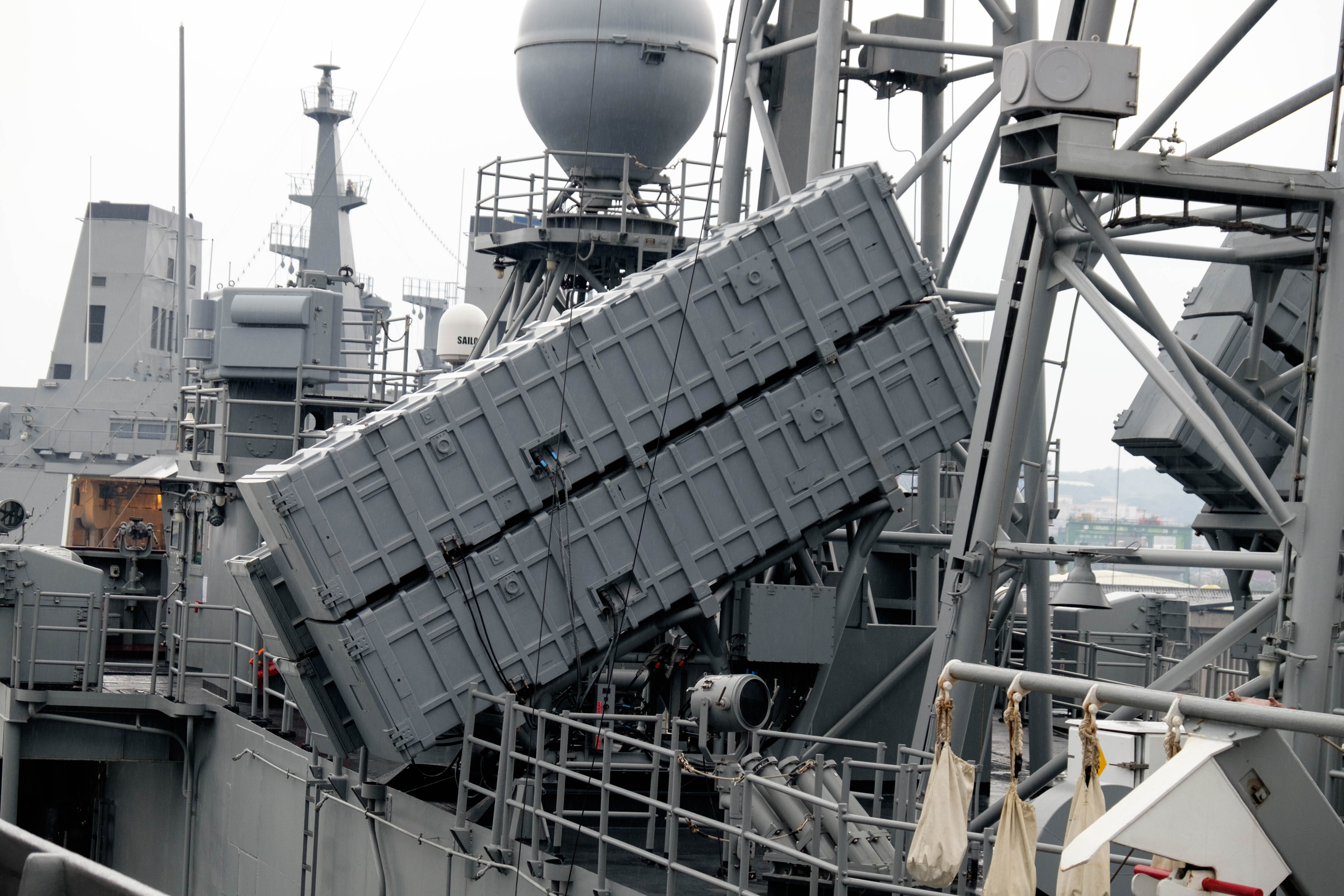
ROCS Chang Chien's Hsiung Feng II and Hsiung Feng III

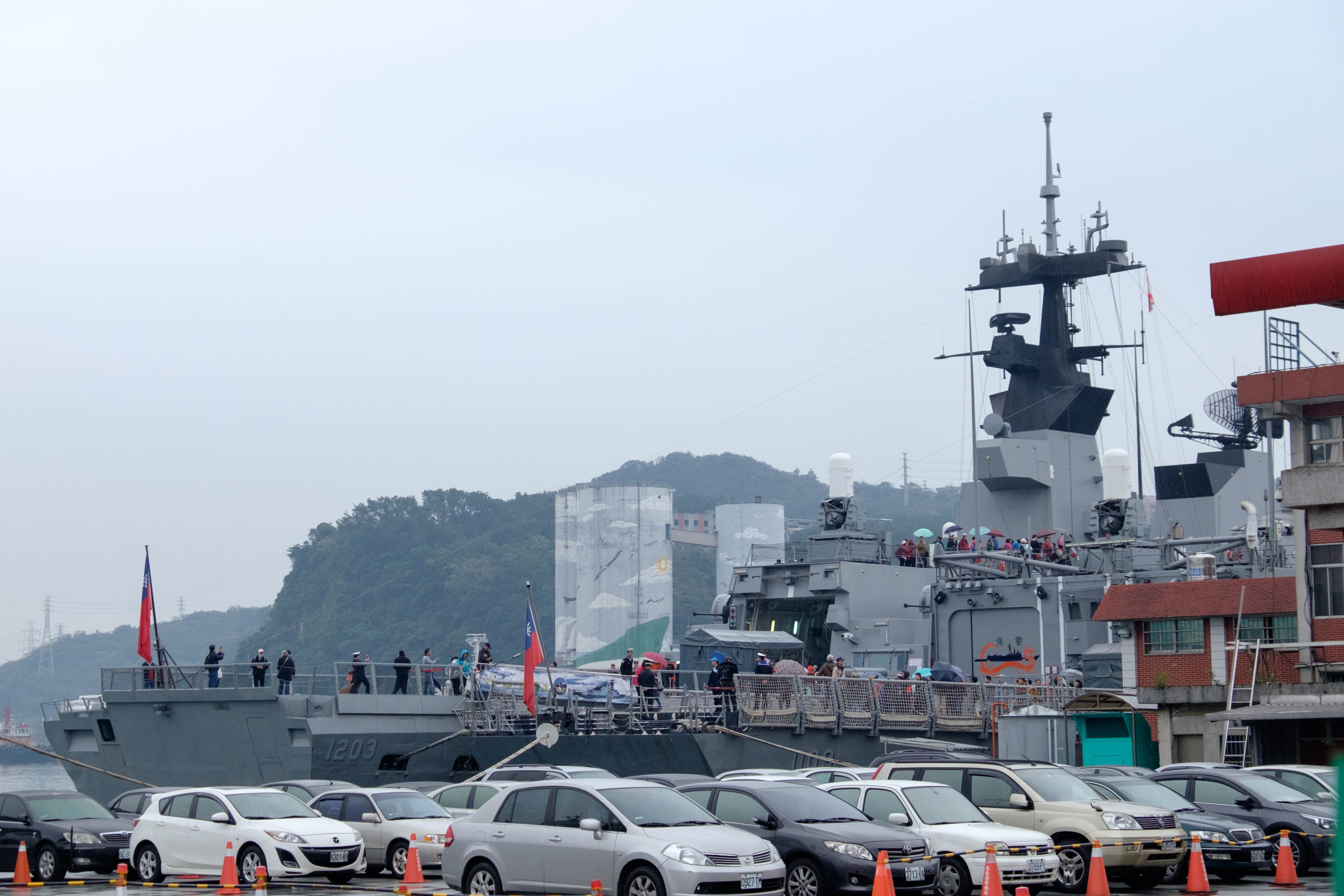
ROCS Chang Chien's aft

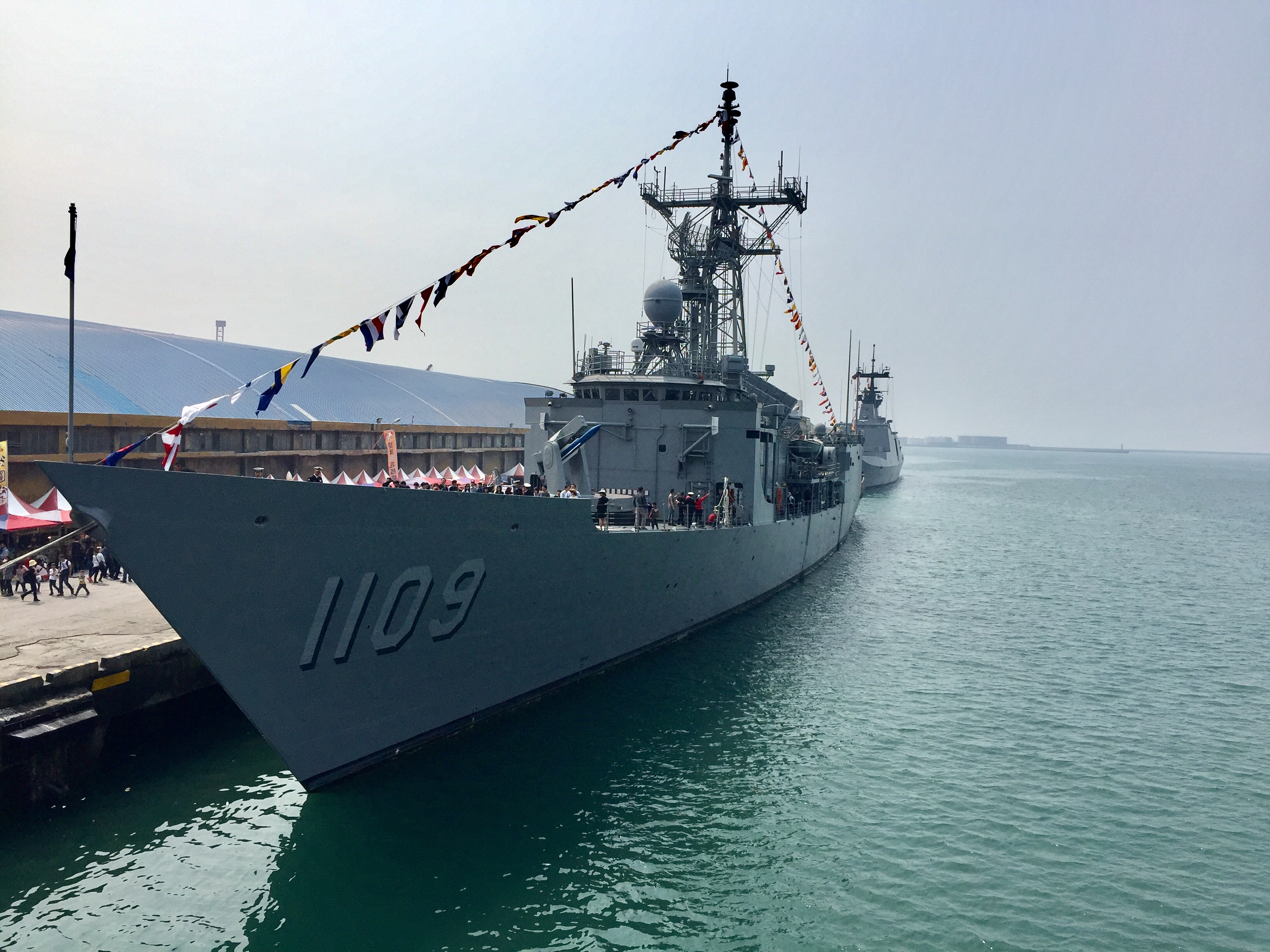
ROCS Chang Chien on 5 March 2017

== See also ==
- ROCS Cheng Ho (PFG2-1103)
- ROCS Chi Kuang (PFG2-1105)
- ROCS Tzu I (PFG2-1107)
- ROCS Pan Chao (PFG2-1108)
- ROCS Tian Dan (PFG2-1110)
