= ROCS Cheng Ho =

Cheng Kung-class frigates

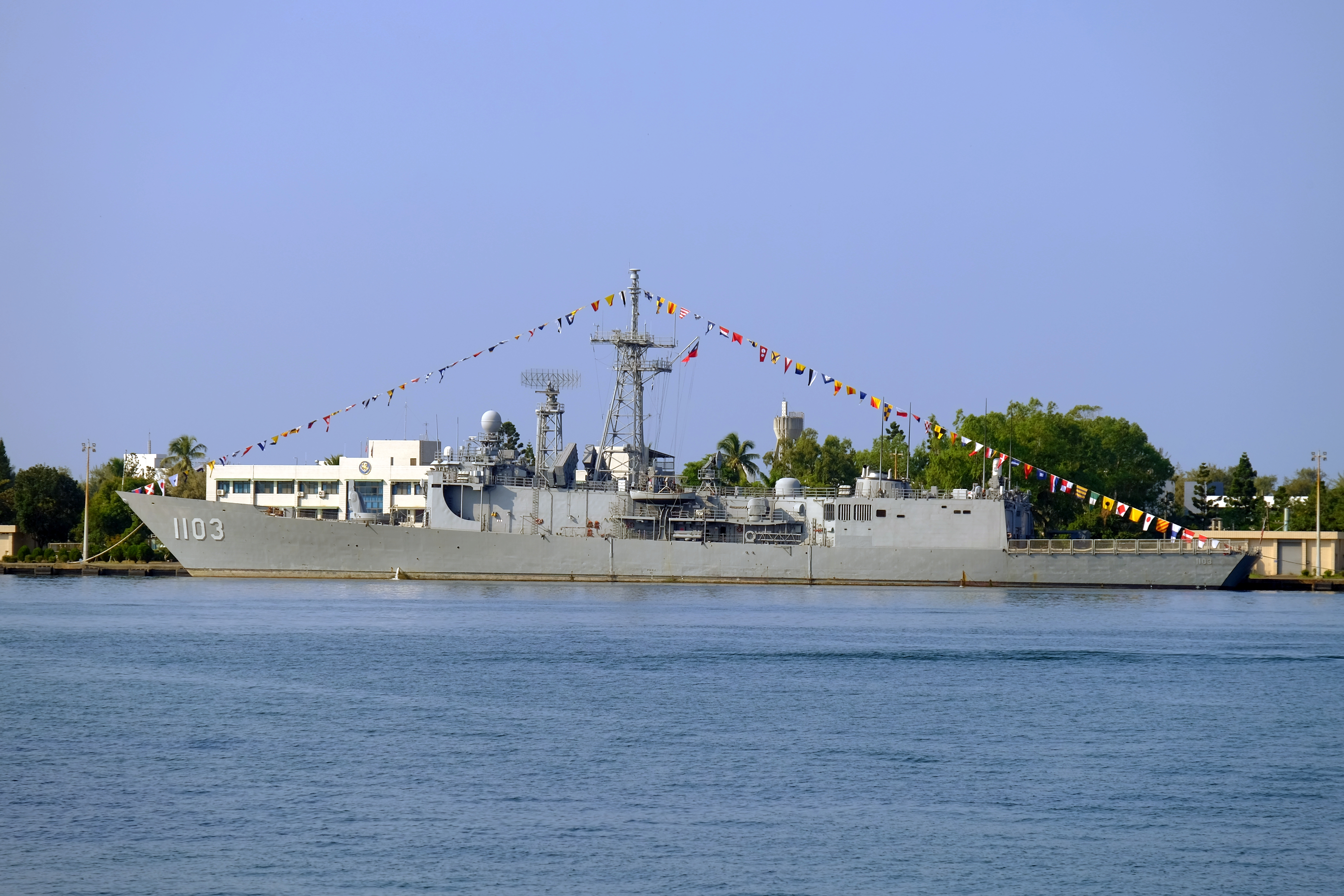
- ROCS Cheng Ho shipped at Zuoying Naval Base on 23 November 2014

History

Republic of China
- Name: Cheng Ho; (鄭和)
- Namesake: Zheng He
- Ordered: 8 May 1989
- Builder: China Shipbuilding Corp., Kaohsiung
- Laid down: 29 October 1991
- Launched: 15 October 1992
- Commissioned: 28 March 1994
- Identification: Pennant number: PFG2-1103
- Status: in active service

General characteristics
- Class & type: Cheng Kung-class frigate
- Displacement: 4,103 long tons (4,169 t) full
- Length: 453 ft (138 m)
- Beam: 46.95 ft (14.31 m)
- Installed power: 40,000 shp total
- Propulsion: General Electric LM2500-30 gas turbines
- Speed: 29 knots
- Complement: 18 officers; 180 enlisted; 19 flight crew
- Sensors & processing systems: AN/SPS-49 air-search radar; AN/SPS-55 surface-search radar; CAS, STIR gun fire control radar; SQS-56 sonar
- Electronic warfare & decoys: AN/SLQ-32(V)5; (AN/SLQ-32(V)2 + SIDEKICK)
- Armament: 40 × SM-1MR at Mk 13 Missile Launcher; 4 × Hsiung Feng II and 4 HF-3 supersonic AShM; 1 × OTO Melara 76 mm naval gun; 2 × Bofors 40mm/L70mm guns; 1 × 20 mm Phalanx CIWS; 2 × triple Mark 32 ASW torpedo tubes with Mark 46 anti-submarine torpedoes
- Aircraft carried: Sikorsky S-70C-1/2
- Aviation facilities: Hangar and helipad

ROCS Cheng Ho (鄭和; PFG2-1103) is the second of eight Taiwanese-built Cheng Kung-class frigate, based on the Oliver Hazard Perry class.

== Construction and career ==
Laid down on 21 December 1991 and launched on 15 October 1992, Cheng Ho (鄭和) was commissioned into service on 28 March 1994. All of the Taiwanese PFGs have the length of the later Oliver Hazard Perry FFGs, but have a different weapon and electronics fit.

In 2006, the Cheng Ho warship participated in the Dunmu Voyage Training Detachment and set off from Zuoying Military Port on March 16. At 7:00 a.m. on March 20, when the Cheng Ho warship was preparing to dock at Malakal Port in Palau, it collided with an unidentified object at the port, causing damage to the ship and loss of power. The Republic of China Navy dispatched the Yue Fei and two tugboats to tow the Cheng Ho warship back to the country for repairs, and later dispatched a Kang Ding-class frigate to replace the Cheng Ho warship.

On June 7, 2019, Cheng Ho warship held a 25th anniversary celebration and a Dragon Boat Festival family reunion at Kaohsiung Port Xinbin Wharf.

On September 14, 2023, the Ministry of National Defense released a video of the ship monitoring the PLA's Jinan.

On May 23, 2024, the ship confronted the PLA's Nantong in the Taiwan Strait during the Joint Sword Exercise.

== Gallery ==
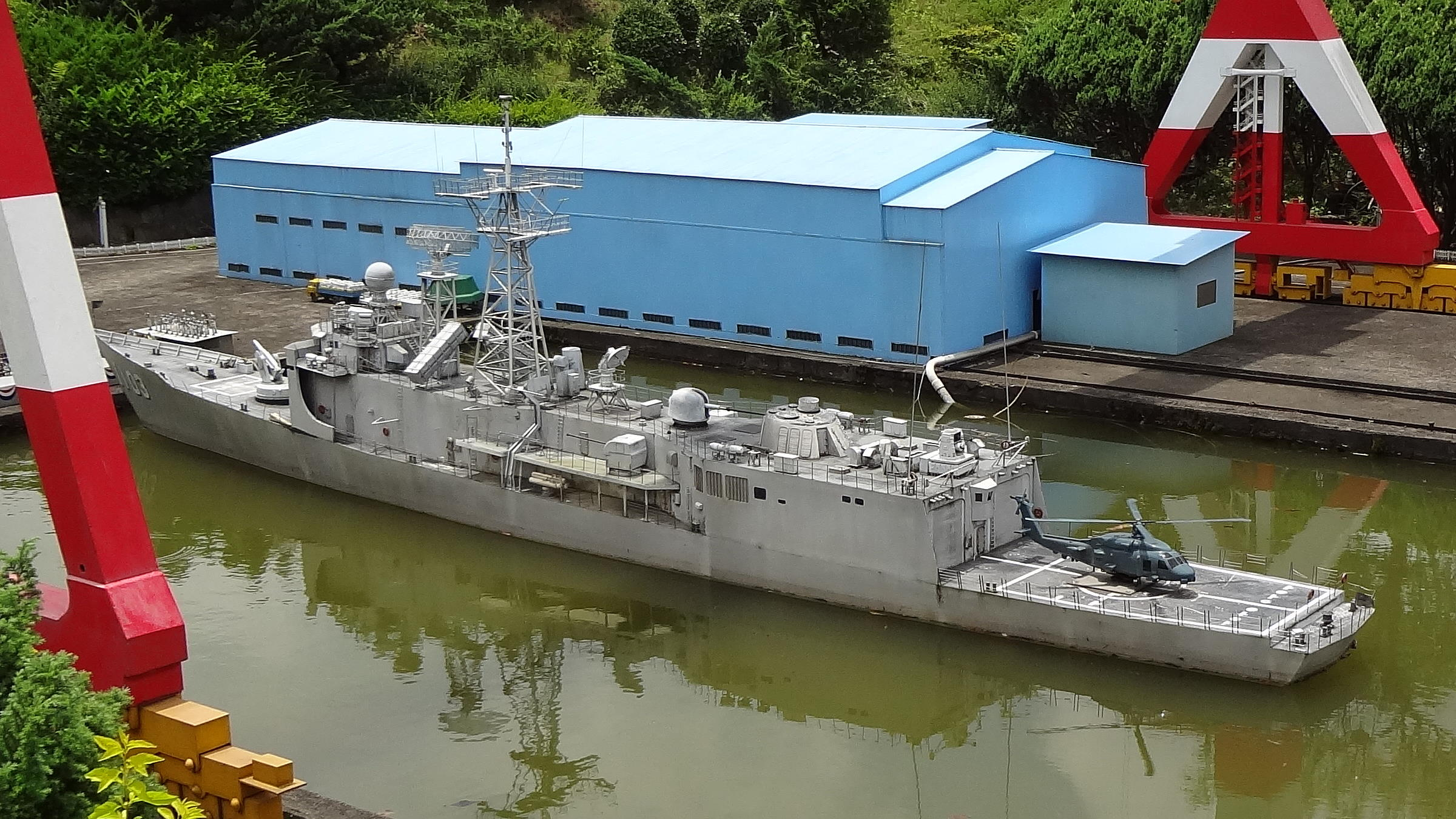
A model of ROCS Cheng Ho

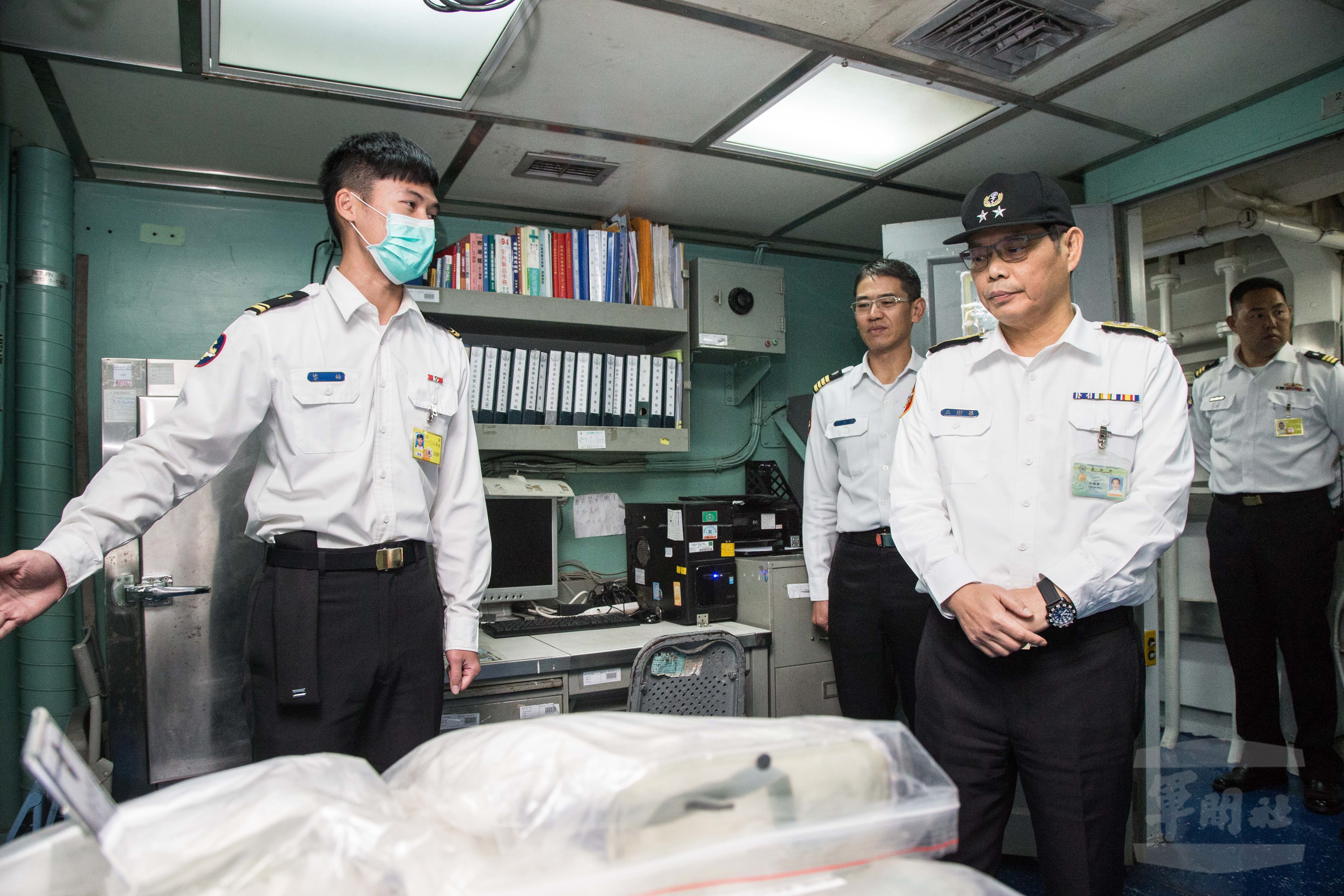
ROCS Cheng Ho's surgical room

== See also ==
- ROCS Chi Kuang (PFG2-1105)
- ROCS Tzu I (PFG2-1107)
- ROCS Pan Chao (PFG2-1108)
- ROCS Chang Chien (PFG2-1109)
- ROCS Tian Dan (PFG2-1110)
