= ROCS Chi Kuang =

Cheng Kung-class frigates

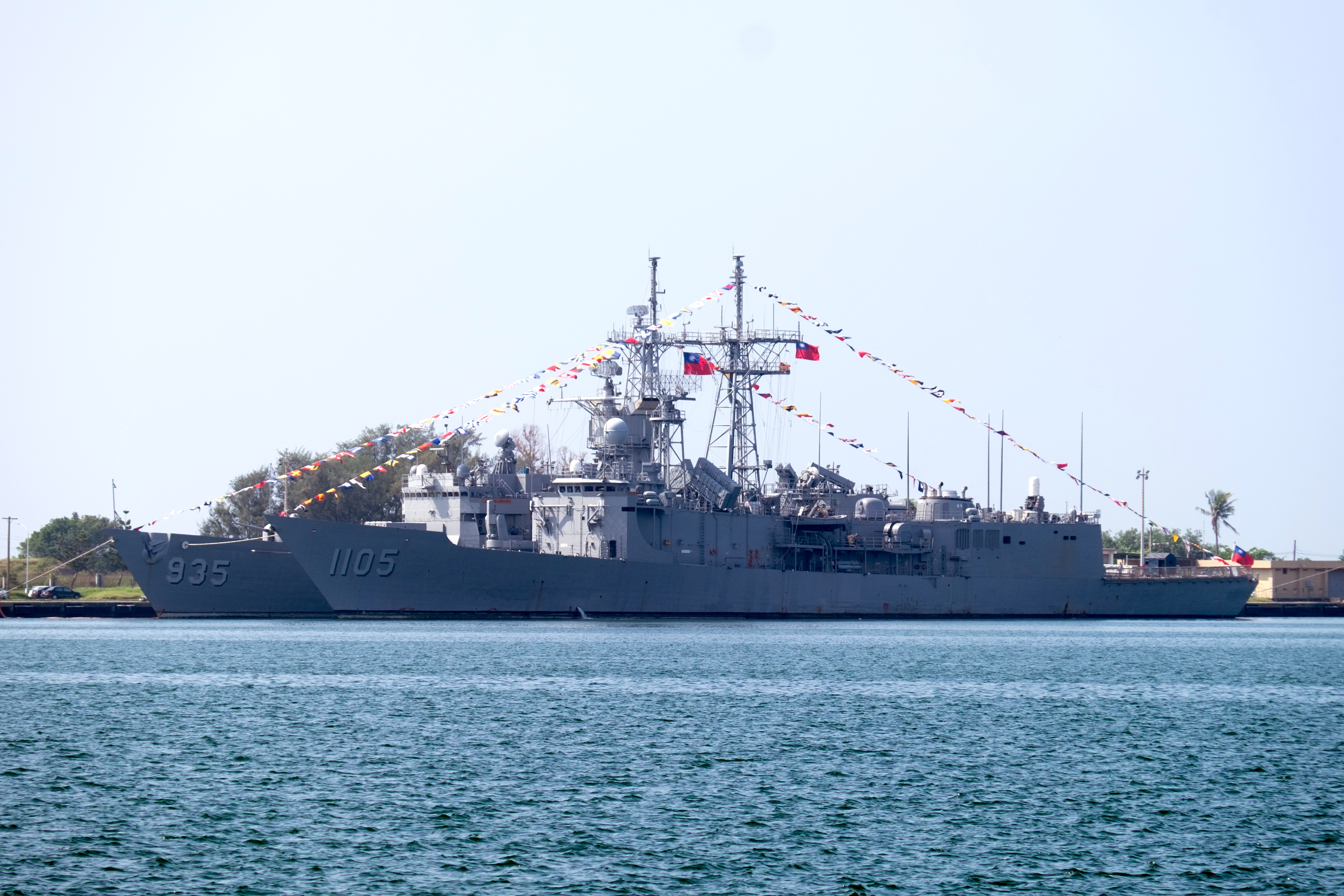
- ROCS Chi Kuang and ROCS Lan Yang on 24 October 2015

History

Taiwan
- Name: Chi Kuang; (戚繼光)
- Namesake: Ch'i Chi-kuang
- Builder: China Shipbuilding Corporation, Kaohsiung
- Laid down: 4 October 1992
- Launched: 27 September 1993
- Commissioned: 4 March 1995
- Status: in active service

General characteristics
- Class & type: Cheng Kung-class frigate
- Displacement: 4,103 long tons (4,169 t) full
- Length: 453 ft (138 m)
- Beam: 46.95 ft (14.31 m)
- Installed power: 40,000 shp total
- Propulsion: General Electric LM2500-30 gas turbines
- Speed: 29 knots
- Complement: 18 officers; 180 enlisted; 19 flight crew
- Sensors & processing systems: AN/SPS-49 air-search radar; AN/SPS-55 surface-search radar; CAS, STIR gun fire control radar; SQS-56 sonar
- Electronic warfare & decoys: AN/SLQ-32(V)5; (AN/SLQ-32(V)2 + SIDEKICK)
- Armament: 40 × SM-1MR at Mk 13 Missile Launcher; 4 × Hsiung Feng II and 4 HF-3 supersonic AShM; 1 × OTO Melara 76 mm naval gun; 2 × Bofors 40mm/L70mm guns; 1 × 20 mm Phalanx CIWS; 2 × triple Mark 32 ASW torpedo tubes with Mark 46 anti-submarine torpedoes
- Aircraft carried: Sikorsky S-70C-1/2
- Aviation facilities: Hangar and helipad

ROCS Chi Kuang (Chinese: 繼光; PFG2-1105) is a Cheng Kung-class guided missile frigate of the Republic of China Navy, used mainly in local air-defense and anti-submarine roles. It is the third of eight Taiwanese-built frigates based on the Oliver Hazard Perry class.

== Construction and career ==
Laid down on 4 October 1992 and launched on 27 September 1993, Chi Kuang was commissioned in service on 7 March 1995. All of these Taiwanese FFGs have the length of the later Oliver Hazard Perry FFGs, but have a different weapon and electronics fit.

== See also ==
- ROCS Cheng Ho (PFG2-1103)
- ROCS Tzu I (PFG2-1107)
- ROCS Pan Chao (PFG2-1108)
- ROCS Chang Chien (PFG2-1109)
- ROCS Tian Dan (PFG2-1110)
