= ROCS Yueh Fei =

Taiwanese Cheng Kung-class frigate

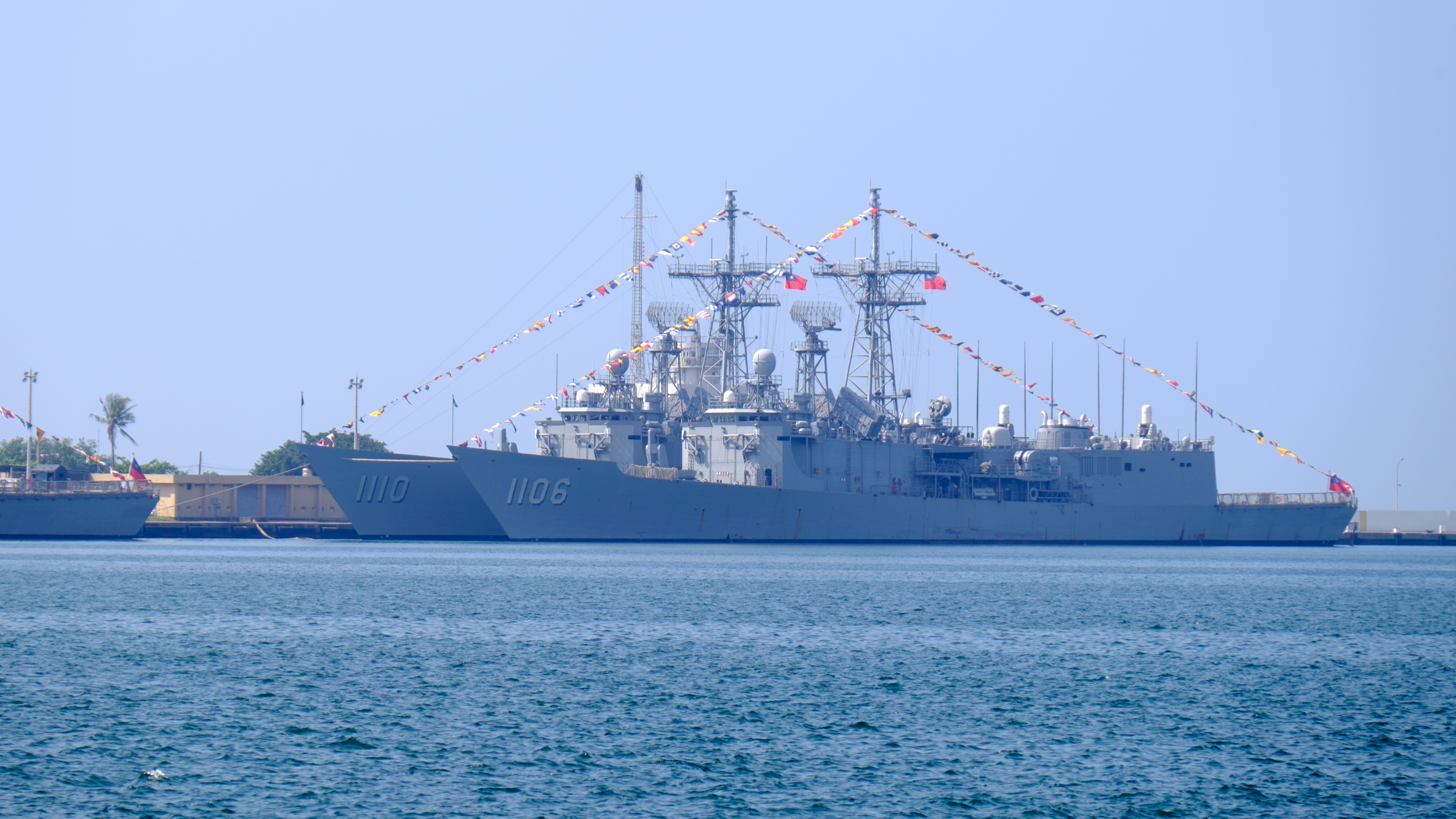
- ROCS Yueh Fei (front) and ROCS Tian Dan on 24 October 2015

History

Republic of China
- Name: Yueh Fei; (岳飛)
- Namesake: Yue Fei
- Builder: China Shipbuilding Corporation, Kaohsiung
- Laid down: 5 September 1992
- Launched: 26 August 1994
- Commissioned: 7 February 1996
- Home port: Tsoying
- Identification: Pennant number: PFG2-1106
- Status: in active service

General characteristics as built
- Type: Frigate
- Displacement: 3,100 long tons (3,100 t) light; 4,200 long tons (4,300 t) full load
- Length: 455 ft 5 in (138.81 m) oa; 413 ft 1 in (125.91 m) wl
- Beam: 45 ft (14 m)
- Draft: 18 ft 8 in (5.69 m)
- Propulsion: 2 × General Electric LM- 2500 gas turbines, 41,000 shp (31,000 kW); 2 × Auxiliary Propulsion Units, 720 hp (540 kW)
- Speed: 29 knots (54 km/h; 33 mph)
- Range: 5,000 nmi (9,300 km; 5,800 mi) at 18 knots (33 km/h; 21 mph)
- Complement: 235
- Sensors & processing systems: Radar: AN/SPS-49, AN/SPS-55, Mk 92 fire control system; Sonar: SQS-56 hull-mounted sonar
- Electronic warfare & decoys: SLQ-32(V)2; Mark 36 SRBOC; AN/SLQ-25 Nixie
- Armament: 1 × Mk 13 Launcher for 40 RIM-66 Standard MR missiles; 2 × triple Mark 32 torpedo tubes with Mark 46 anti-submarine torpedoes; 1 × OTO Melara 76 mm/62-caliber naval gun; 2 × Bofors 40 mm/L70 guns; 1 × 20 mm Phalanx CIWS point defense cannon; 2 × Type 75 20 mm/68-caliber guns; 4 × Hsiung Feng II SSM
- Aircraft carried: 2 × S-70C(M)-1/2 helicopters

ROCS Yueh Fei (岳飛, PFG2-1106), is a Cheng Kung-class guided-missile frigate of the Republic of China Navy (ROCN). She is the fourth ship of the class. Named for the famous Chinese commander Yue Fei, the ship was constructed by the China Shipbuilding Corporation at their yard in Kaoshuing, Taiwan. The Cheng Kung-class frigates are based on the American Oliver Hazard Perry class and share many of the same characteristics, the main difference being armed with Taiwanese Hsiung Feng II and Hsiung Feng III surface-to-surface missiles and different sensors. Yueh Fei was laid down on 5 September 1992, launched on 26 August 1994 and commissioned into the ROCN on 7 February 1996.

== Design and description ==
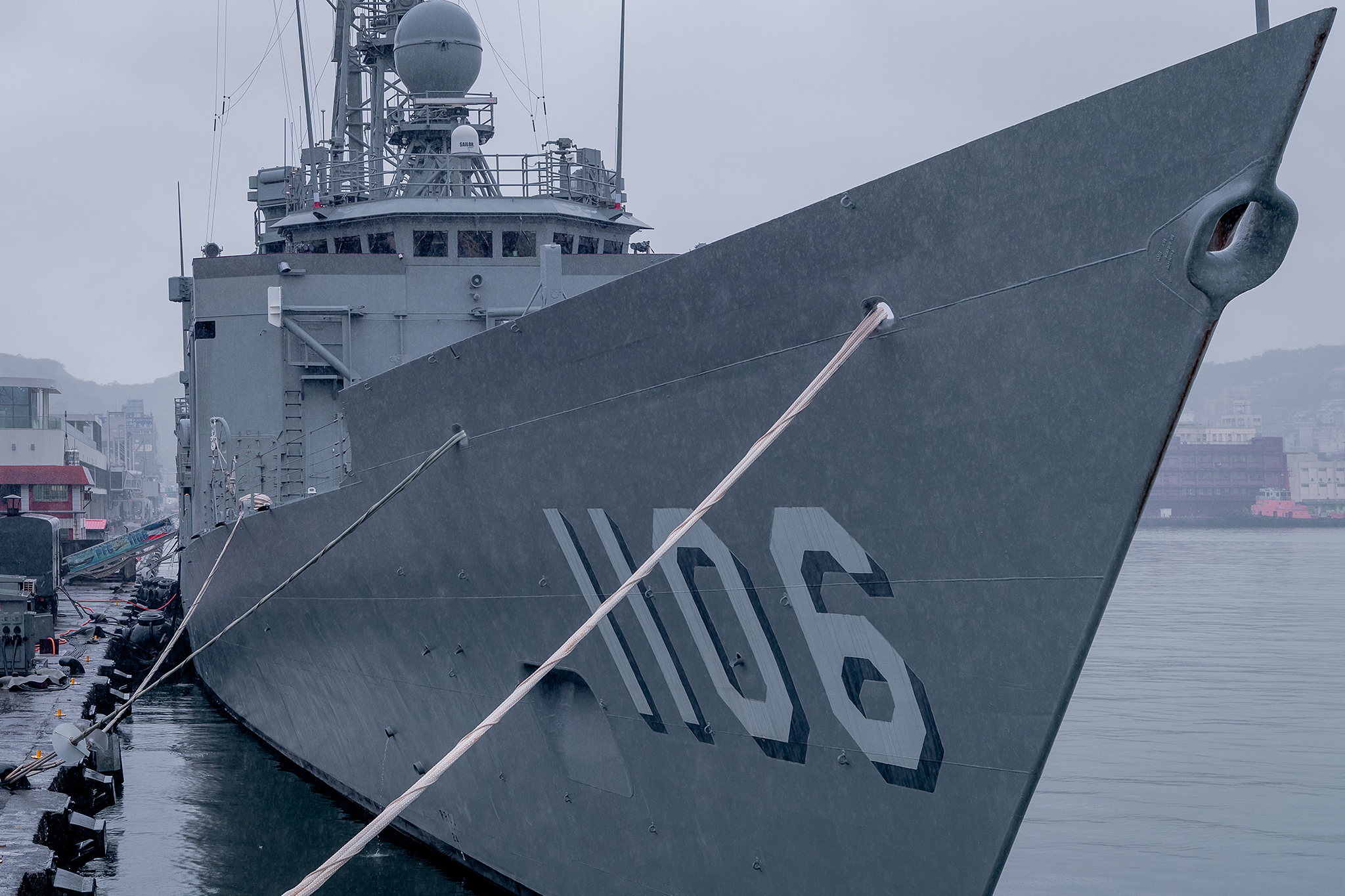
Yueh Fei's bow

The Cheng Kung class are based on the long-hulled version of the Oliver Hazard Perry-class frigates of the United States Navy but with modifications. The class was intended to be built in two batches, with Batch I built to the standard design, and Batch II constructed to an improved design, incorporating new technologies. The standard initially had a light displacement of 3,100 long tons (3,100 t) and a full load displacement of 4,200 long tons (4,300 t). They initially measured 455 feet 5 inches (138.81 m) long overall and 413 ft 1 in (125.91 m) at the waterline with a beam of 45 ft (14 m) and a maximum draft of 18 ft 8 in (5.69 m). They are powered by two General Motors LM-2500 gas turbines turning one shaft connected to a controllable pitch propeller, creating 41,000 shaft horsepower (31,000 kW). They also have two drop-down auxiliary propulsion units that create 720 hp (540 kW). This gives them a maximum speed of 29 knots (54 km/h; 33 mph). They carry 587 long tons (596 t) of fuel giving them a range of 5,000 nautical miles (9,300 km; 5,800 mi) at 18 knots (33 km/h; 21 mph). The ships have four 1,000 kW diesel alternator sets for generating electricity. For additional stability in heavy seas, the ships have fin stabilizers. The frigates have a crew of 206 including 13 officers and an air group of 19.

The frigates were initially armed with eight Hsiung Feng II SSMs placed in two box launchers located atop the superstructure aft of the bridge. They also mounted a Mark 13 launcher for 40 RIM-66 Standard MR surface-to-air missiles. They have an OTO Melara 76-millimetre (3 in)/62 dual-purpose naval gun situated forward and two single-mounted Bofors 40 mm (1.6 in)/L70 guns. The 40 mm guns cannot be crewed while the 76 mm gun is firing due to blast effects. (Note: /62 refers to the length of the gun in terms of calibers. A /62 gun is 62 times as long as it is in bore diameter.) The Cheng Kung class mounts a 20 mm (0.79 in)/76 Phalanx close-in weapon system (CIWS) atop the hangar. Flanking the CIWS atop the hangar are two Type 75 20 mm/75 guns. For ASW, the frigates are armed with two triple-mounted 324 mm (12.8 in) Mk 32 torpedo tubes for Mark 46 torpedoes.

The ships mount SPS-55 surface search radar, SPS-49(V)5 air search, Mark 92 fire control radar, STIR 24 missile fire control radar and Mark 90 Phalanx fire control radar. They are also equipped with DE 1160B hull-mounted sonar and are capable of using the ATAS towed passive sonar or the SQR-18A towed sonar. For electronic countermeasures, they mount the Chang Feng IV suite, which consists of the SLQ-32(V)5 radar warning system and the Sidekick radar jammer, and the SLQ-25 Nixie torpedo decoy system. The ships are equipped with the Prairie-Masker acoustic signature reduction system. The ships came designed with a hangar and aft helicopter deck capable of operating two helicopters. However, the ROCN had difficulty acquiring helicopters capable of operating from the class until they obtained the S-70C Thunderhawk helicopters from the United States. Though capable of operating two, only one is kept housed aboard the frigates. The ships use the Recovery Assist, Secure and Traverse (RAST) haul-down system for their helicopters.

=== Upgrades ===
The displacement of the Cheng Kung-clas frigates has varied over time. In 2009, it was reported that the vessels had a light displacement of 2,750 long tons (2,790 t) and a full load displacement of 4,105 long tons (4,171 t). Furthermore, their draft increased to a maximum of 24 ft 5 in (7.44 m). This increased again by 2013, with the ships displacing 3,207 long tons (3,258 t) light with a maximum draft of 28 ft 3 in (8.60 m).

The Cheng Kung class was initially fitted with eight Hsiung Feng II SSMs, instead of the Harpoon missiles that the Oliver Hazard Perry class used. Ships of the class began refitting with four Hsiung Feng III (HF III) missiles, replacing four of the Hsiung Feng II missiles after the new HF III missiles entered production. In addition, the ROCN ordered Harpoon missiles for use by the Cheng Kungs in September 2000. After the US stopped supporting the SM-1 and their associated launch system support was taken up by NCSIST which also implemented an upgrade program for the missiles. Upgrades to the SM-1 include a better rocket motor and an active seeker.

The class's Mk 75 main guns have been upgraded and have an improved firing rate of 100 rounds a minute.

== Construction and career ==
The fourth ship of the Cheng Kung class, Yueh Fei was laid down on 5 September 1992 by the China SB Corp., at their yard Kaohsiung City, Taiwan. The frigate was launched on 26 August 1994, and commissioned on 7 February 1996. The ship was named for the famous Chinese commander Yue Fei. The Cheng Kung class formed the 146th Frigate Squadron.

On March 20, 2006, when the Dunmu Sailing Training Detachment was preparing to dock at Palau Malaka Harbor, the Zheng He Warship collided with an unidentified object at the port, causing damage and loss of power. The Republic of China Navy dispatched the Yue Fei warship and two tugboats to rush to the rescue and towed the Zheng He warship back to China for repairs.

In the 2018 Hanguang 34th Exercise, the Jiguang Frigate (FFG-1105), Yuefei Frigate and the Mingchuan Frigate (FFG-1112) and Fengjia Frigate (FFG-1115) returned to China for refurbishment from US arms sales have been replaced with OTO Melara (OTO) original stealth turrets.

From August 13 to 15, 2022, this ship closely monitored the PLA's Xuchang.

On August 19, 2023, this ship monitored the PLA 052C Jinan performing the "Sea and Air Joint Combat Readiness Patrol" mission.
