= Republic of China Naval Aviation Command =

Republic of China Naval Antisubmarine Aviation Command
- 中華民國海軍反潛航空指揮部
- Active: 1977–present
- Country: Republic of China
- Part of: Republic of China Naval Fleet Command

Insignia
- Roundel

Aircraft flown
- Helicopter: S-70C, 500MD/ASW

The Republic of China Naval Antisubmarine Aviation Command (Chinese: 中華民國海軍反潛航空指揮部; pinyin: Zhōnghuá Mínguó Hǎijūn Hángkōng Zhǐhuībù) is the naval aviation branch of the Republic of China Navy. The ROCNAC's primary mission is to defend ROC territories and the sea lanes that surround Taiwan against an attack by the People's Republic of China.

== Organization ==
- Aviation Command (operates from Pingtung, Tsoying and Hualien AB)

- 701st Helicopter Group, S-70C(M)-1, at Hualien.
- 702nd Helicopter Group, S-70C(M)-2, at Tsoying.
- 703rd Helicopter Training Group, 500MD ASW, at Tsoying.
- Maintenance Group

- 1st Maintenance Squadron (Pingtung)
- 2nd Maintenance Squadron (Tsoying)
- 3rd Maintenance Squadron (Hualien)

== Equipment and procurement ==
=== Aircraft ===
Aircraft	Origin	Type	Versions	In service	Notes
Sikorsky S-70 Seahawk	United States	Naval utility/anti-submarine helicopter	S-70C(M)-1/2 Thunderhawk	17	Initial order of 10, followed by an additional order of 11
Hughes 500MD/ASW Defender	United States	Anti-submarine helicopter	—	9	12 ordered

== See also ==
- Black Bat Squadron
- People's Liberation Army Naval Air Force
