= Republic of China Navy =

Maritime service branch of Taiwan's military

- Emblem of the Republic of China Navy
- Founded: 14 October 1911; 114 years ago
- Country: Republic of China (Taiwan)
- Type: Navy
- Role: Maritime warfare
- Size: 40,000 active personnel (2023); 67,000 reservists (2023); 167 ships (2023); 24 aircraft (2023)
- Part of: Nationalist Chinese military (1928-1946); Republic of China Armed Forces (since 1946)
- Colors: White; Blue; Red
- March: 新海軍 ("The New Navy")
- Fleet: 4 Destroyers; 21 Frigates; 11 Corvettes; 36 Missile boats; 5 Submarines
- Website: navy.mnd.gov.tw/index.aspx (in Chinese) navy.mnd.gov.tw/en/index.aspx (in English)

Commanders
- Commander of the Navy: Admiral Chiang Cheng-kuo
- Deputy Commanding-General: Vice Admiral Ma Qunchao
- Master Chief Petty Officer: Chief Petty Officer First Class Weng Linjun

Insignia
- Ensign

- Jack

- Commissioning pennant

- Unit colour

Chinese name
- Traditional Chinese: 中華民國海軍
- Simplified Chinese: 中华民国海军
Transcriptions
Standard Mandarin
- Hanyu Pinyin: Zhōnghuá Mínguó Hǎijūn
- Bopomofo: ㄓㄨㄥ ㄏㄨㄚˊ ㄇㄧㄣˊ ㄍㄨㄛˊ ㄏㄞˇ ㄐㄩㄣ
- Wade–Giles: Chunghua Minkuo Haichün
- Tongyong Pinyin: Jhōnghuá Mínguó Hǎijyūn
other Mandarin
- Xiao'erjing: ژْوڭخُوَا مِنْقُوَ حَےْجُنْ
Hakka
- Romanization: Chûng-fà Mìn-koet Hói-kiûn
Southern Min
- Hokkien POJ: Tiong-hôa Bîn-kok Hái-kun
- Tâi-lô: Tiong-huâ Bîn-kok Hái-kun

The Republic of China Navy (ROCN, Chinese: 中華民國海軍; pinyin: Zhōnghuá Mínguó Hǎijūn), colloquially known as the Taiwanese Navy (Chinese: 台灣海軍; pinyin: Táiwān Hǎijūn) by Western or mainland Chinese media, or commonly referred as the National Military Navy (Chinese: 國軍海軍; pinyin: Guójūn Hǎijūn) by local Taiwanese people, is the maritime branch of Taiwan's military, the Republic of China Armed Forces.

The service was formerly known as the Chinese Navy, the Central Navy or the Nationalist Chinese Navy before and during World War II, as well as and prior to the ROC's retreat to Taiwan.

Today, the ROC Navy's primary mission is to defend the territorial waters of the Taiwan Area under the jurisdiction of the government of the Republic of China (Taiwan) against any possible blockades, attacks, or invasion from the People's Liberation Army of Communist China coming from the mainland. Operations include maritime patrols in the Taiwan Strait and surrounding waters, as well as readiness for counter-strike and counter-invasion operations during wartime. The Republic of China Marine Corps (ROCMC) functions as a branch of the Navy.

The ship prefix, for the Republic of China warships, is ROCS (Republic of China Ship). An older term was the CNS (Chinese Navy Ship), which was mostly used with the pre-WWII era Nationalist Chinese navy ships.

== History ==
=== Early years ===
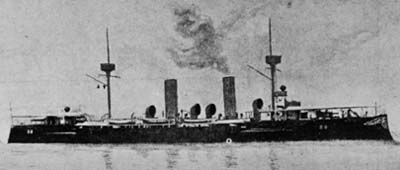
Imperial Qing Navy Cruiser Hai Yung, later served as CNS Hai Yung of the Republic of China Navy

The Republic of China Navy traces its origins to the Imperial Qing Navy. During the Xinhai Revolution, by late October 1911, nearly the entire Qing fleet had defected to the revolutionary forces. Under the leadership of Admiral Sa Zhenbing (Chinese: 薩鎮冰), then Minister of the Navy, who deliberately avoided taking military action against the revolutionaries, the Qing fleet effectively aligned itself with the new Republic. This mass defection formed the foundational core of what would become the Republic of China Navy.

Later the commander of one of those ships, Huang Chung-ying (Chinese: 黃鍾瑛), became the first Minister of the Navy of the Republic of China, where as Sa Zhenbing had served in several civilian administrative roles in the Beiyang government.

Several naval expansion programs were proposed during the first decade of the republic, but none of them were carried out because of a lack of funding, the outbreak of World War I, and the chaos of the Warlord Era in China. The cruisers that had been acquired by the Qing dynasty between the 1870s and the 1900s remained the main ships of the Chinese fleet through the 1930s. During this time the ROC Navy consisted of three fleets: the Central, Northeast, and Guangdong fleets, and its command structure was divided because of the warlordism in the country. When Sun Yat-sen established his government in 1917 in Guangzhou he was supported by the Navy admirals Cheng Biguang and Lin Baoyi, and when Chiang Kai-shek began his Northern Expedition in 1926 another admiral, Yang Shuzhuang, led part of the Beiyang Fleet to defect to Chiang's forces.

=== Navy of the Nationalist China ===
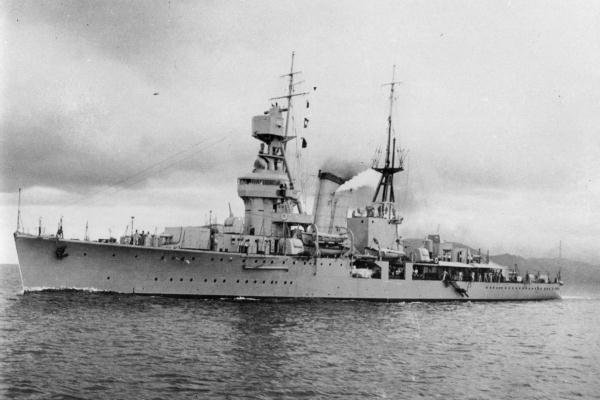
Nationalist Chinese Cruiser CNS Ninghai on sea trials in 1932

Following the success of the Northern Expedition, the Republic of China Navy (ROCN) formally realigned with the Nationalist Government under Chiang Kai-shek. During this time the Navy was commonly referred as the Central Navy (Chinese: 中央海軍).

Prior to 1938, the Republic of China Navy operated as an independent national institution, and was not under the authority of the largely KMT controlled Military Affairs Commission of the Nationalist Government. This gave the navy a unique administrative status, distinct from the Army, Military Police, Air Force, and Air Defense Troops, all of which were part of the National Revolutionary Army under the Military Affairs Commission of the Nationalist Government. Ironically, the Republic of China Navy during that period, is still commonly referred to by mainland Chinese media—particularly pro-communist outlets—as the Navy of the Kuomintang (Chinese: 国民党海军), despite having little direct association with the Kuomintang party itself.

Chiang expressed strong interest in modernizing and expanding the navy, and while some steps were taken—such as acquiring new vessels and reorganizing command structures—these efforts were only partially realized due to limited industrial capacity, financial constraints, and competing military priorities. The most notable examples of these efforts were the acquisition of the two Ninghai-class light cruisers and a number of torpedo boats purchased from the German Reich and the United Kingdom, respectively, reflecting an attempt to build a more capable blue-water force despite the difficult circumstances.

By the late 1930s, the ROCN continued to emphasise to coastal and riverine defense, with a particular emphasis on the Yangtze river, whose navigability allowed ocean-going vessels to penetrate deep into the Chinese interior.

However, when the Second Sino-Japanese War broke out in 1937, the ROCN proved vastly outmatched by the Imperial Japanese Navy. Several of its key ships, including cruisers, were either destroyed in air raids or deliberately scuttled by their crews as blockships along the Yangtze.

With most of its combat vessels either destroyed or scuttled during the early naval engagements of the Second Sino-Japanese War, the Republic of China Navy suffered a near-total defeat at the hands of the Imperial Japanese Navy. Facing a situation where it could no longer effectively operate a fleet, the Ministry of the Navy was dissolved on January 1, 1938, and downgraded to the Navy Command Headquarters under the Military Affairs Commission of the Nationalist Government. This marked the end of the navy’s independent administrative status and its integration into the broader military command structure dominated by the National Revolutionary Army.

=== Chinese Civil War ===
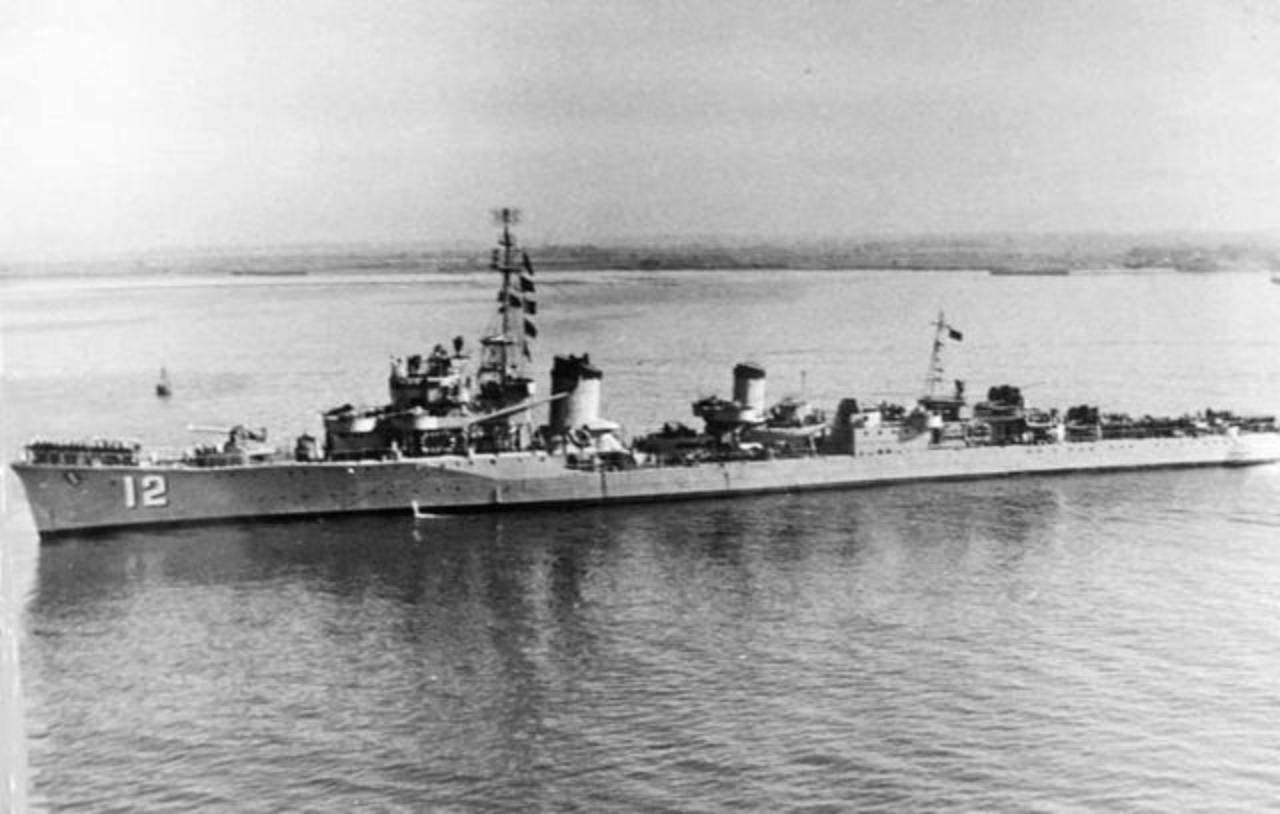
ROCS Dan Yang (DD-12), ex-IJN Destroyer Yukikaze, one of the most notable naval ships received by the ROCN right after WWII, as part of Japan's war reparations

Following World War II, the Republic of China Navy received a number of former Japanese and American warships as part of postwar realignment and military aid. Most of the Imperial Japanese Navy vessels transferred to China were delivered as part of Japan's war reparations, while the decommissioned U.S. Navy ships were provided primarily through American military assistance programs. These additions temporarily strengthened the ROCN's capabilities during the turbulent years of the Chinese Civil War, in which the navy played a key role in escorting supply convoys and ultimately in the evacuation of the ROC government and over one million refugees to Taiwan in 1949.

In parallel with these developments, the Republic of China Marine Corps was reactivated on September 16, 1947, as part of a broader naval reorganisation. After the retreat to Taiwan, the navy underwent extensive restructuring and revival, a process later immortalized in the post-1949 ROC Navy anthem, the New Navy (Chinese: 新海軍).

=== After relocation to Taiwan ===
The island of Taiwan was placed under Japanese rule from 1895, with the Imperial Japanese Navy responsible for defending the waters of Taiwan and Penghu. After World War II, on 25 October 1945, the jurisdiction of Taiwan and Penghu was transferred to the Republic of China and the ROCN began its operation in that territory.

Following the relocation of the ROC government to Taiwan, the ROCN was involved in a number of commando attack escorts, evacuation and transport of more displaced soldiers and later to provide patrols and resupply operations to Kinmen and Matsu in the Taiwan Strait and South China Sea offshore islands.

The Navy Fleet Helicopter Squadron, established on September 1, 1977, marked the official reactivation of naval aviation capabilities for the Republic of China Navy. This milestone ended a nearly-four-decade hiatus in operational naval aviation since the outbreak of the Second Sino-Japanese War, during which the original ROC naval air arm had been lost or rendered inactive.

Since the 1990s the Navy has grown in importance as the emphasis of the ROC's military doctrine moves towards countering a possible People's Republic of China (PRC) blockade, as well as offshore engagement. As of 2004 the ROCN had been working hard to expand its capability in electronic and anti-submarine warfare, as well as the replacement of antiquated warships and support vessels. While for many years the ROCN operated hand me down and foreign designed vessels in recent years they have been operating a higher number of indigenous platforms, sensors, and weapons much of it made by the National Chung-Shan Institute of Science and Technology.

In 2018 Lungteh Shipbuilding was awarded a contract to produce eleven Tuo Chiang Block II corvettes and four minelayers for the Taiwanese Navy.

In April 2020 in response to the COVID-19 pandemic the ROCN cut short their semi-annual goodwill mission to Central and South America. The flotilla consisting of two frigates and a supply vessel was subject to 30 days of quarantine after returning to Taiwan.

In April 2020 Taiwanese boatbuilder Karmin International Co., Ltd. won a NT$450-million (US$14.9-million) contract to supply the Republic of China Navy with eighteen special operations watercraft and eight RIB tenders, the latter for the Cheng Kung-class frigates. Delivery was scheduled for June 2022. The contract covered only the watercraft themselves with their machine guns, infrared equipment, and boarding ladders sourced separately.

In December 2025, the ROC Naval Command announced it seeks to purchase 1,500 unmanned surface vessels (USV)s, which would be capable of operating up to 44 kilometers off the coast, use "swarm" tactics, and resist electronic warfare. The procurement is part of Taiwan's proposed new military budget for 2026.

== Rank and rating insignia ==
=== Officer ranks ===
Rank group	General/flag officers				Senior officers			Junior officers
Republic of China Navy
Republic of China Navy	一級上將; Yījí shàngjiàng	二級上將; Èrjí shàngjiàng	中將; Zhōngjiàng	少將; Shàojiàng	上校; Shàngxiào	中校; Zhōngxiào	少校; Shàoxiào	上尉; Shàngwèi	中尉; Zhōngwèi	少尉; Shàowèi

=== Other ranks ===
Rank group	Senior NCOs					Junior NCOs		Enlisted
Republic of China Navy
Republic of China Navy	一等士官長; Yīděng shìguānzhǎng	二等士官長; Èrděng shìguānzhǎng	三等士官長; Sānděng shìguānzhǎng	上士; Shàngshì	中士; Zhōngshì	下士; Xiàshì	上等兵; Shàngděngbīng	一等兵; Yīděngbīng	二等兵; Èrděngbīng

== Equipment ==
Traditionally, most ROCN equipment has been purchased from the United States. The ships themselves have often been older, second-hand vessels without the newest technology. More recently, in the 1990's several ships have been built domestically under licence or through domestic development. The ROCN has also purchased La Fayette-class frigates from France and Zwaardvis-class submarines from the Netherlands as well as four U.S. Kidd-class (renamed Keelung) destroyers originally intended for Iran. Despite the ROCN refurbishing and extending the service life of its vessels and equipment, it has suffered from procurement difficulties due to pressures exerted by the PRC.

On 12 September 2007, an arms notification was sent to the United States Congress concerning an order for 12 P-3C Orion patrol aircraft and 3 "spare aircraft", along with an order for 144 SM-2 Block IIIA surface-to-air missiles. A contract was awarded to Lockheed Martin to refurbish the 12 P-3C Orion aircraft for the ROC on 13 March 2009, with deliveries to start in 2012.

In 2008, the ROCN set out to acquire an improved anti-ship capability. On 26 August, an arms notification was sent to Congress for an order for 60 air-launched Harpoon Block II missiles for the 12 P-3Cs. At least a portion of these missiles will be installed on the navy's Hai Lung-class submarines.

On 29 January 2010, the U.S. government announced five notifications to the U.S. Congress for arms sales to the ROC. In the contracts total US$6.392 billion, ROC Navy would get 2 Osprey-class minehunters for US$105 million, 25 Link 16 terminals on ships for US$340 million, 10 ship- and 2 air-launched Harpoon L/II for US$37 million.

The ROC Navy already has 95 older Harpoon missiles in its inventory for the 8 Knox-class frigates, 22 newer RGM-84L for the 4 Kidd-class destroyers, 32 sub-launched Harpoon II on order for the 2 Hai Lung-class submarines, and with 60 air-launched Harpoon Block II anti-ship missile on order for the 12 P-3Cs, plus the newly announced 10 ship-launched and 2 air-launched Harpoon II/L sales.

On 31 August 2010, it was announced for the next year's defense budget, ROCN planned to lease one or two more Newport-class tank landing ships (LST) from the United States, but the 900-ton stealth corvette plan was put on hold, due to lack of funds. That same year, On 29 September, the U.S. Congress passed a resolution, authorizing the U.S. Government for the sale of one more Osprey-class minehunter to the ROC.

Other ongoing local upgrade programs include locally designed and built Ching Chiang class of 12 patrol ships. Since 2006, seven ships of this class were upgraded to carry four HF-2/3 with W-160 fire control radar from Wu Chin III program (as well as Honeywell H-930 MCS CDS stripped from seven retired Yang-class Wu Chin 3 anti-air warfare destroyers). In 2010 more ships of this class were undergoing this same upgrade program but using CSIST produced fire control radars instead.

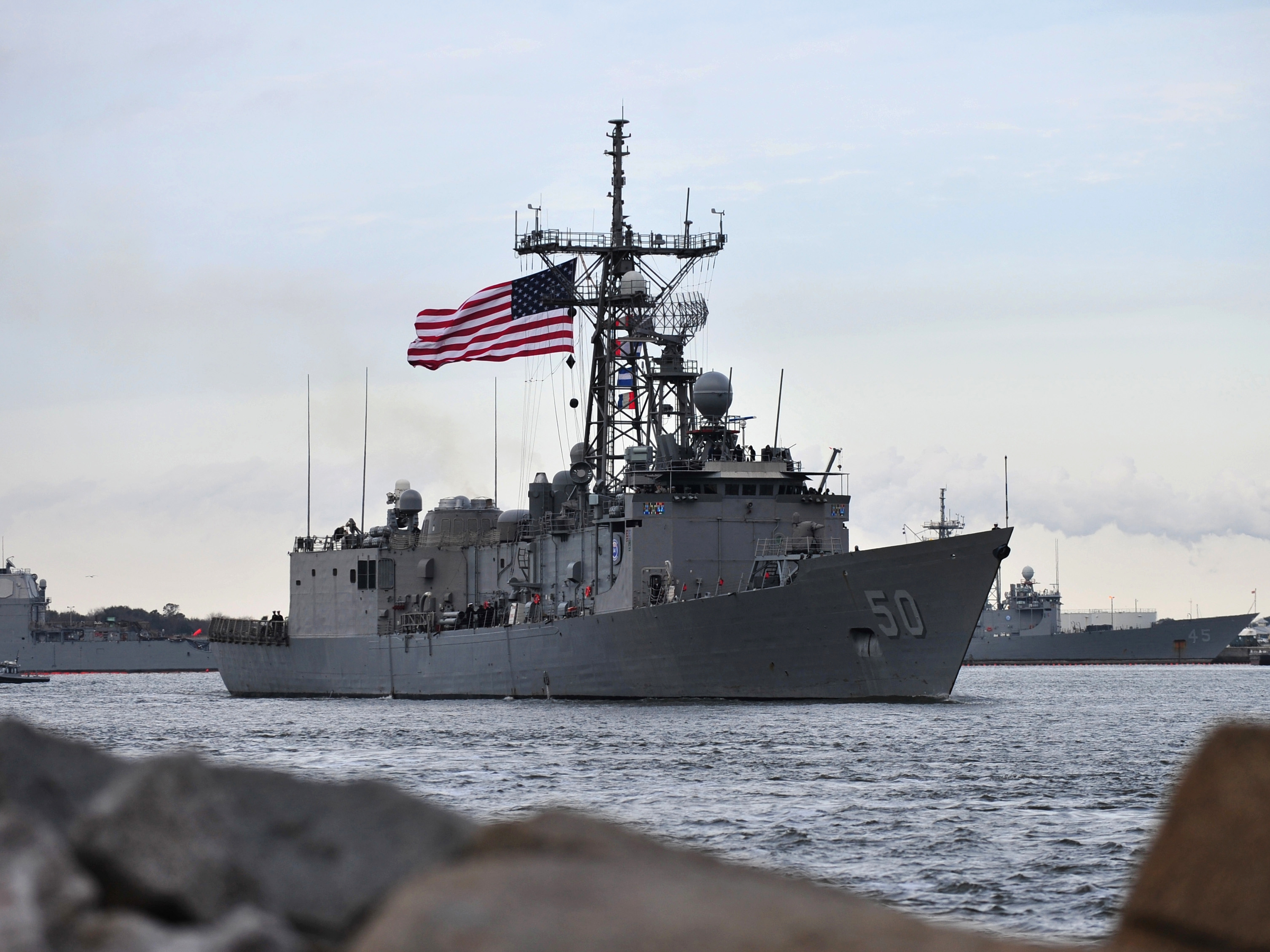
USS Taylor in 2014

On 29 December 2010, two LSTs (中肇、中治戰車登陸艦) and four remaining of Adjutant-class coastal minehunters were retired.

In 2011, the navy retired several vessels. On 31 October, all eight PCL in the 124th Fleet were retired. On 28 December, the two Lung Jiang-class (PSMM Mk5) guided missile patrol boats (PGG 601 and PPG 602) of the 131st Fleet were retired from ROC Navy service, after entering service in 1978 and 1981 respectively.

In June 2018, two Oliver Hazard Perry-class frigates of the US Navy, ex-USS Taylor and ex-USS Gary, were handed over to the Government of the Republic of China for the Republic of China Navy. The transfer cost was an estimated US$177 million. The transfer of the ships includes the advanced AN/SQR-19 Multi-Function Towed array sonar. Taiwan had previously been blocked from acquiring the AN/SQR-19, and the transfer of the system points to an anti-submarine focus in line with the Knox-class frigates they will likely replace.

The keel of a new rescue and salvage ship was laid in March 2022.

=== Mark 32 missile launcher ===
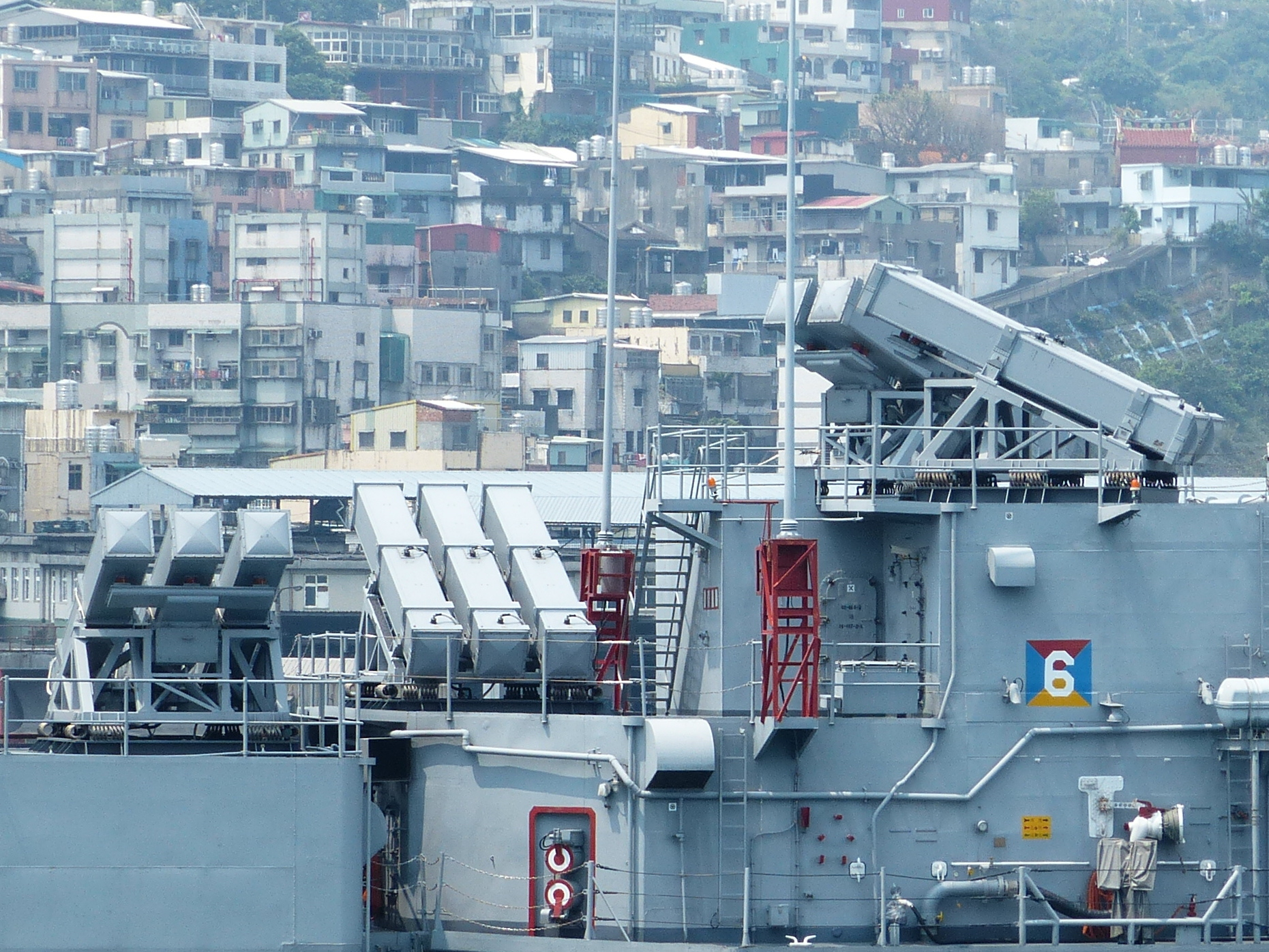
Mark 32 launchers aboard ROCN Yi Yang

The Mark 32 guided missile launching system (GMLS) is a box launcher for the SM-1MR Standard missile, developed for the ROCN. It was first purchased for and fitted to Yang class frigates (upgraded World War II-era Gearing class), and later moved to Chi Yang-class frigates. It comes in both twin and triple variants, usually with two of each installed.

=== Fleet Air Defense Upgrade / Hsun Lien Project ===
The ROC Navy currently lacks a modern fleet defense system. Keelung class destroyers currently use obsolete Mark 26 missile launchers designed from the 1970s and does not currently have a modern centralized air defense combat system like the Aegis Combat System. Past US administrations rejected the sale of Aegis radar system and Arleigh Burke-class destroyers, including George W. Bush in 2001. Under the George W. Bush administration, the US instead sold Taiwan four Kidd-class destroyers (reworked into the Kee Lung-class), which did not carry the Aegis and were no longer in service in the US Navy at the time. However, in January 2019, the US government delivered two sets of Mk 41 VLS to Taiwan. The ROC government plans to integrate the MK41 VLS and locally developed Tien-Kung III (Sky Bow III) with its indigenously developed Hsun Lien naval combat system, which is similar to Aegis, to upgrade its ship air defense capabilities. Taiwan has acquired the license and technology to produce additional MK 41 VLS launchers. The ROC Navy currently as of 2019 possesses at least 14 warships compatible with the Mk41. In November 2019 it was reported that the decommissioned amphibious landing ship Kao Hsiung (LCC-1) was being used as a test ship for the Hsun Lien naval combat system project and had been fitted with a large phased array radar system and the Mark 41 Vertical Launching System. In January 2020, it is reported the Tien-Kung III (Sky Bow III) is successfully fired from the Mark 41 Vertical Launching System. In August 2023, it was reported the domestically developed Hua Yang vertical missile launch system (VLS) has passed tests and will be installed on new naval ships in the future. In 2022, it was reported as a short-term solution the ROC Navy will upgrade their Kang Ding-class (La Fayette class) with 32-cell VLS integrated with their domestically developed Aegis-like system with the assistance of a retired French Navy officer. The VLS will have TC-2N surface-to-air missiles, a large upgrade over the existing RIM-72C Sea Chaparral, though it will lack the air defense range of its Kee Lung-class destroyer with their SM-2 Block IIIA missiles.

=== Future Light Frigates ===
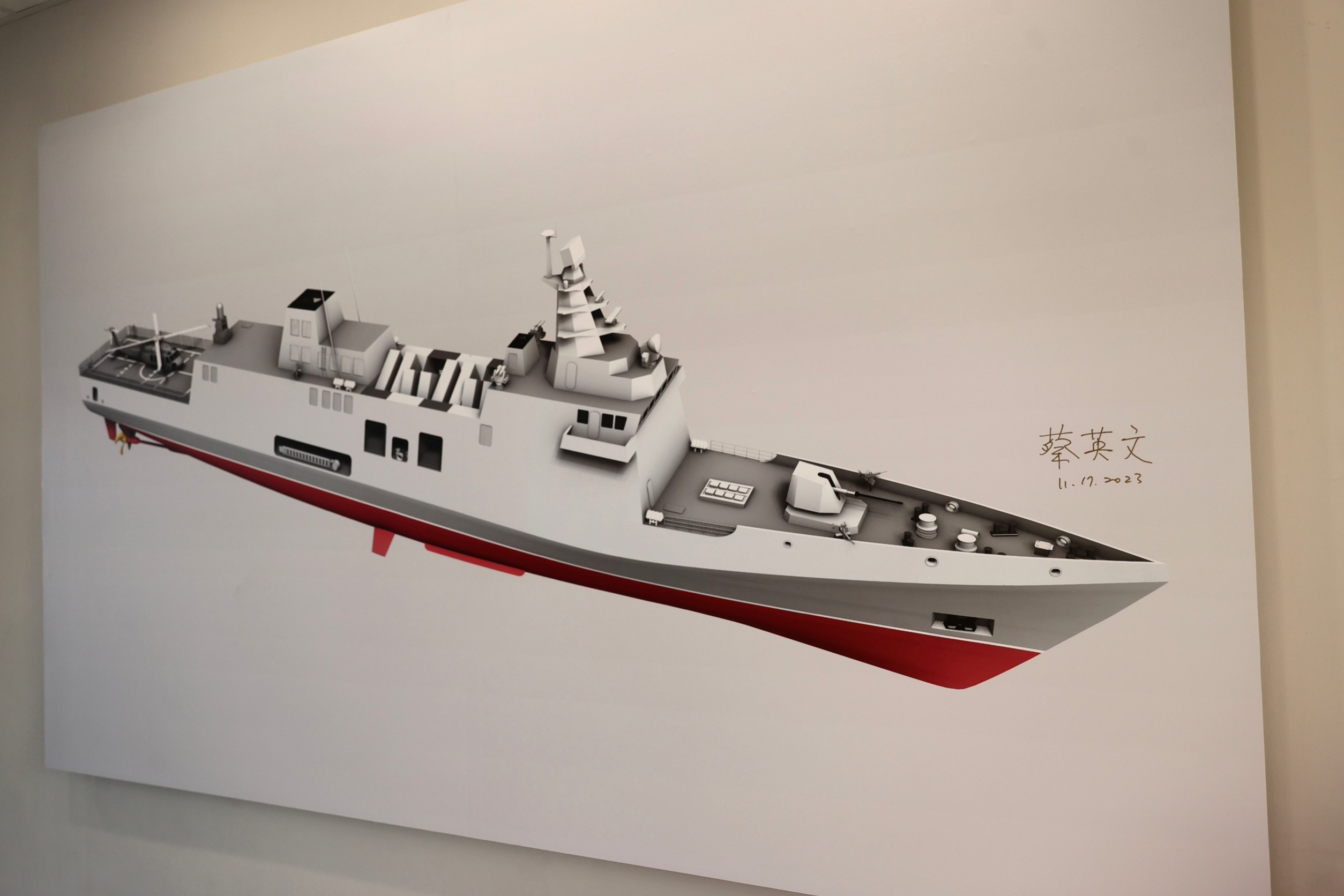
Light frigate concept image

The ROC Navy has started construction on 12 new domestically-built light frigates for the Taiwanese navy. These vessels are in the 2,500-ton weight class and will have two configurations, an anti-aircraft warfare (AAW) version and an anti-submarine warfare (ASW) version. Both variants will be equipped with an OTO Melara 76mm gun with programmable ammunition and a close-in weapons system (CIWS), either a Phalanx 20mm gun system or the indigenous Sea Oryx. The AAW variant will have a 32 cell VLS for TC-2N missiles while the ASW will have two box launchers for 16 TC-2N missiles. The AAW variant will have 8 anti-ship cruise missile launchers, each able to fit either a single HF-2 or HF-3, while the ASW variant will have 16 launchers. The ASW variant is the only variant that will be fitted with Mk 32 light torpedo launchers and a towed variable depth sonar. The frigates will have a BAE System's Artisan radar, Lockheed Martin Canada's CMS-330 combat management system, and either Rolls Royce MT30 or General Electric LM2500 engines for propulsion. The new frigates are intended to become the workhorse of the ROC Navy, replacing the larger OHP and La Fayette class frigates in patrol duties.

Construction began on one of both AAW and ASW light frigate variants between 2023 and 2024. In February 2026, procurement documents outline the plan for the remaining 10 light frigates which would cost a total of $7.8 billion, split equally between the two configurations. The AAW variant will be 96m long in length, with a 21m beam and 3.3m draft, while the ASW variant differs only in length at 116m.

=== Indigenous "Landing Platform Dock" / Amphibious Assault Ship ===
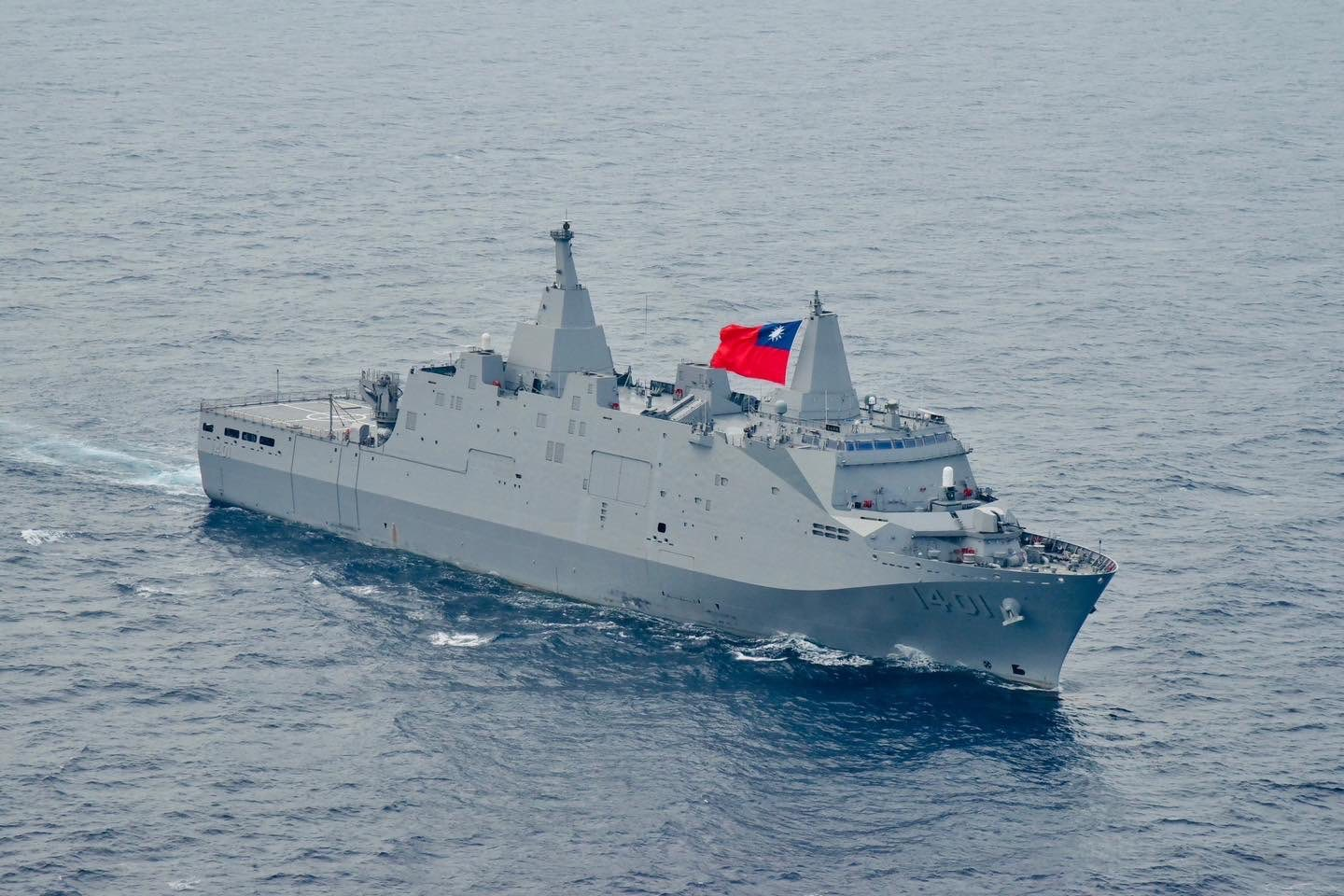
LPD-1401 Yu shan

In September 2018, Taiwan confirmed a contract for the first amphibious assault ship built in Taiwan. It will be built by CSBC Corporation, a local shipyard. Four are planned, with the first to enter service around 2021. It will be roughly similar to the US Navy's San Antonio-class, but with a slightly smaller displacement. Support features include a full hospital, well deck, full aviation facilities, storage for wheeled vehicles, and dedicated accommodations for a full battalion of Marines. The vessel design will be armed with a 76 mm naval gun in the primary position, a close-in weapon system (CIWS) turret, two 12.7 mm machine gun positions in the forward section, and launchers that can deploy the Hsiung Feng II and III family of anti-ship and land-attack cruise missiles. The primary sensor is expected to be a naval version of the indigenous CS/MPQ-90 Bee Eye AESA radar.

=== Hai Kun-class submarine (formerly: Indigenous Defense Submarine Program) ===
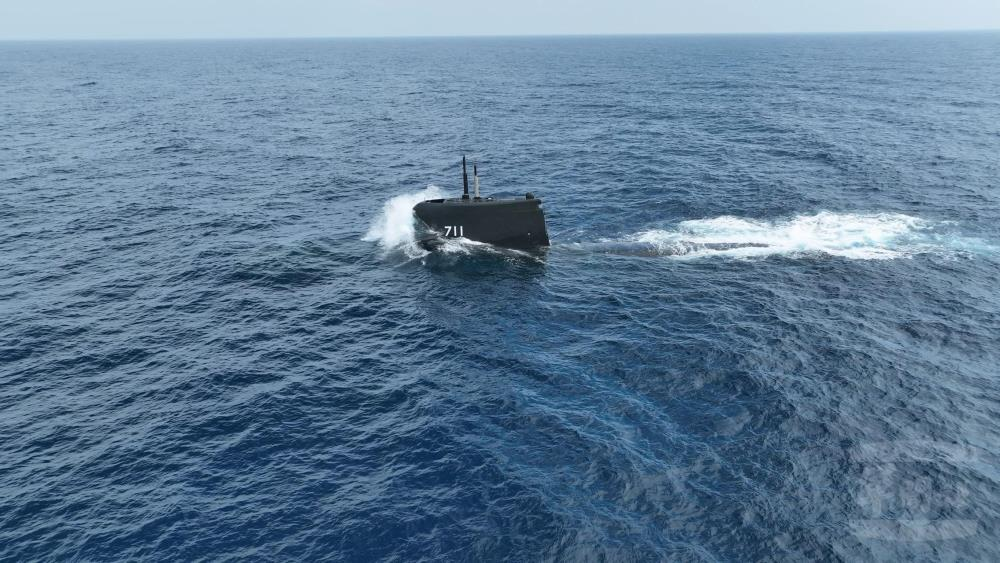
SS-711 Hai Kun

In November 2020, President Tsai Ing-wen opened the submarine construction facility in Kaohsiung with plans to build eight submarines. Construction was to begin with a prototype boat which was to be built over 78 months. The first boat is scheduled to enter service in 2025. Between December 2020 and February 2021, the United States reportedly approved the export of three key systems to Taiwan for the program: digital sonar systems, integrated combat systems and auxiliary equipment systems (periscopes).

In 2023, Taiwan revealed its first domestically designed and built submarine, the Hai Kun. The submarine was moved onto a floating dry dock and then launched off the CSBC shipyard in Kaoshiung on February 26, 2024.

=== Surface fleet ===
==== Destroyers (4 in service) ====
Class	Picture	Type	Ships	Displacement (Note: Displacement when submerged)	Note
Kee Lung-class	Kee-Lung-class	United States / destroyer	ROCS Kee Lung (DDG-1801); ROCS Su Ao (DDG-1802); ROCS Tso Ying (DDG-1803); ROCS Ma Kong (DDG-1805)	9,574 tonnes	Formerly Kidd-class destroyers in US Service built in 1978. Originally built for the Imperial Iranian Navy.

==== Frigates (21 in service) ====
Class	Picture	Type	Ships	Displacement	Note
Cheng Kung-class	Cheng Kung-class	Republic of China & United States / frigate	ROCS Cheng Kung (PFG2-1101); ROCS Cheng Ho (PFG2-1103); ROCS Chi Kuang (PFG2-1105); ROCS Yueh Fei (PFG2-1106); ROCS Tzu I (PFG2-1107); ROCS Pan Chao (PFG2-1108); ROCS Chang Chien (PFG2-1109); ROCS Tian Dan (PFG2-1110); ROCS Ming Chuan (PFG-1112); ROCS Feng Jia (PFG-1115)	4,105 tonnes	Eight licensed ships based on US Oliver Hazard Perry class built. Two additional ex-US Navy ships (ROCS Ming Chuan & ROCS Feng Jia ) purchased
Kang Ding-class	Kang Ding-class	France / frigate	ROCS Kang Ding (PFG-1202); ROCS Si Ning (PFG-1203); ROCS Kun Ming (PFG-1205); ROCS Di Hua (PFG-1206); ROCS Wu Chang (PFG-1207); ROCS Chen De (PFG-1208)	3,600 tonnes	French-built La Fayette class
Chi Yang-class	Chi Yang-class	United States / frigate	ROCS Fong Yang (FF-933); ROCS Fen Yang (FFG-934); ROCS Hwai Yang (FFG-937); ROCS Ning Yang (FFG-938); ROCS Yi Yang (FFG-939)	4,260 tonnes	Ex-Knox class

==== Corvettes (11 in service; 5 in building) ====
Class	Picture	Type	Ships	Displacement	Note
Ching Chiang-class	Ching Chiang-class	Republic of China / patrol ship / corvette	ROCS Jin Chiang (PG-610); ROCS Po Chiang (PG-614); ROCS Chang Chiang (PG-615); ROCS Chu Chiang (PG-617)	500 tonnes	Delivery began 1999–2000
Tuo Chiang-class	Tuo Chiang-class	Republic of China / corvette	ROCS Tuo Chiang (PGG-618); ROCS Ta Chiang (PGG-619); ROCS Fu Chiang (PGG-620); ROCS Hsu Chiang (PGG-621); ROCS Wu Chiang (PGG-623); ROCS An Chiang (PGG-625); ROCS Wan Chiang (PGG-626)	600 tonnes	Lead ship delivered in March 2014.

==== Fast attack missile craft (30 in service) ====
Class	Picture	Type	Ships	Displacement	Note
Kuang Hua VI-class	Kuang Hua VI-class	Republic of China / missile boat	FACG-61/2009; FACG-62/2009; FACG-63/2009; FACG-64/2009; FACG-65/2009; FACG-66/2009; FACG-68/2010; FACG-69/2010; FACG-70/2010; FACG-71/2010; FACG-72/2010; FACG-73/2010; FACG-74/2010; FACG-75/2010; FACG-77/2010; FACG-78/2010; FACG-79/2011; FACG-80/2011; FACG-81/2011; FACG-82/2011; FACG-83/2011; FACG-84/2011; FACG-86/2011; FACG-87/2011; FACG-88/2011; FACG-89/2011; FACG-90/2011; FACG-91/2011; FACG-92/2011; FACG-93/2011	186.5 tonnes	Delivery began 2003

==== Mine warfare vessels (10 in service) ====
Class	Picture	Type	Ships	Displacement	Note
Yung Feng-class	Yung Feng-class	Germany / minesweeper	ROCS Yung Feng (MHC-1301); ROCS Yung Chia (MHC-1302); ROCS Yung Nien (MHC-1303); ROCS Yung Shun (MHC-1305)	558.3 tonnes	MWW-50 class, built anew in Germany in early 1990s
Yung Jin-class	Yung Jin-class	United States / minesweeper	ROCS Yung Jin (MHC-1310); ROCS Yung An (MHC-1311)	893 tonnes	ex-Osprey class
Min Jiang-class	Min Jiang-class	Republic of China / minelayer	FMLB-1; FMLB-2; FMLB-3; FMLB-5	347 tons	Built in Taiwan by Lung Teh Shipbuilding, 2020-2021

==== Amphibious ships (8 in service) ====
Class	Picture	Type	Ships	Displacement	Note
Newport class	Newport-class	United States / tank landing ship	ROCS Chung Ho (LST-232); ROCS Chung Ping (LST-233)	8,450 tonnes	ex-USN USS Manitowoc (LST-1180) and USS Sumter (LST-1181)
Chung Hai-class	Chung-hai-class	United States / tank landing ship	ROCS Chung Chien (LST-205); ROCS Chung Chie (LST-218); ROCS Chung Ming (LST-227); ROCS Chung Yeh (LST-231)	4,080 tonnes	Landing Ship, Tank (LST-1)
Hsu Hai-class	Hsu Hai-class	United States / dock landing ship	ROCS Hsu Hai (LSD-193)	13,700 tonnes	ex-USS Pensacola (LSD-38), an Anchorage-class dock landing ship
Yushan-class	Yus han-class	Republic of China / Amphibious transport dock	ROCS Yus han (LPD-1401)	10,600 tonnes	

=== Submarine fleet ===
==== Submarines (4 in service; 1 undergoing trials) ====
Class	Picture	Type	Boats	Displacement	Note
Chien Lung-class	Chien Lung-class	Netherlands / Diesel-electric submarine	ROCS Hai Lung (SS-793); ROCS Hai Hu (SS-794)	2,660 tonnes	Based on Zwaardvis-class submarine. These are also known by the lead ship's name as the Hai Lung-class.
Hai Shih-class (Tench-class)	Hai Shih-class	United States / Diesel-electric submarine	ROCS Hai Shih (SS-791) (ex-USS Cutlass); ROCS Hai Bao (SS-792) (ex-USS Tusk)	2,420 tonnes	Used primarily for training. World's oldest longest-serving submarines. Has two (one for each submarine) of the three remaining working Arma gyrocompass in the world. Expected to be retired after construction of IDS project boats.
Hai Kun-class	Hai Kun-class	Republic of China / Diesel-electric submarine	ROCS Hai Kun (SS-711)	2,500 tonnes	First domestically developed submarine. Launched on February 26, 2024.

=== Auxiliary fleet ===
==== Auxiliary ships (7 in service) ====
Class	Picture	Type	Boats	Displacement	Note
Pan Shi-class	Pan Shi-class	Republic of China / fast combat support ship	ROCS Pan Shi (AOE-532)	20,895 tonnes	AOE-532
Wu Yi-class	Wu Yi-class	Republic of China / fast combat support ship	ROCS Wu Yi (AOE-530)	17,000 tonnes	AOE-530
Ta Kuan-class	Ta Kuan-class	Italy / research ship	ROCS Ta Kuan (AGS-1601)	3,200 tonnes	Oceanographic measurement
Ta Hu-class (Diver-class)	Ta Hu-class	United States / rescue and salvage ship	ROCS Da Hu (ARS-552) (ex-USS Grapple); ROCS Da Juen (ARS-556) (ex-USS Recovery)	1,975 tonnes	Expected to be retired after the construction of the An-hai Project
Ta Tung-class (Cherokee-class)		United States / fleet tug	ROCS Ta Wan (ATF-551) (ex-USS Apache)	1,255 tonnes	Expected to be retired after the construction of the An-Hai Project
Da Wu-class		Republic of China / rescue and salvage ship	ROCS Da Wu (ARS-571)	3,250 tonnes	ARS-571

=== Aircraft ===
==== Fixed-wing ====
Name	Origin	Type	Variant	In service	Notes
Lockheed P-3 Orion	United States	Maritime patrol	P-3C	12	Re-built ex-US Navy aircraft and replaced ROCN Grumman S-2 Trackers
NCSIST Albatross	Republic of China	Reconnaissance UAV		26	In service as of 2019
NCSIST Cardinal	Republic of China	Reconnaissance UAV	Cardinal II	54	six units (54 aircraft) acquired in 2016
NCSIST Albatross II	Republic of China	Reconnaissance UAV		36	In service as of 2026

==== Helicopters ====
Name	Origin	Type	Variant	In service	Notes
Sikorsky S-70	United States	Search and rescue / Anti-submarine warfare	S-70C(M)-1/2 Thunderhawk	18	To be replaced
McDonnell Douglas MD 500 Defender	United States	Anti-submarine warfare	500MD/ASW Defender	7	Out of original 13 ordered

=== Armament ===
==== Surface-to-air missiles ====
Name	Origin	Type	Notes
Sky Sword I	Republic of China	Short-range	Shipboard deployment with Sea Oryx system.
Sky Sword II	Republic of China	Medium-range	Unknown number of TC-2N, to be fielded on Tuo Chiang Block II corvettes and retrofitted on the Kang Ding-class frigates.
RIM-66 SM-1MR	United States	Medium-range	97 RIM-66B Standard-1MR delivered in 1993, 207 RIM-66B Standard-1MR delivered in 1994, 204 RIM-66B Standard-1MR delivered in 2001
RIM-66 SM-2MR	United States	Medium-long range	148 Standard Missile-2MR delivered in 2005, 144 Standard Missile-2MR delivered in 2008, 16 Standard Missile-2MR ordered in 2017
FIM-92 Stinger	United States	Short-range	250 missiles, 70 launch systems and 62 friend-or-foe identification systems, all of which are expected to be delivered by 2025.
RIM-72C Sea Chaparral	United States	Short-range	Deployed on some domestic warships as well as La Fayette Frigates. To be replaced.

==== Anti-ship missiles ====
Name	Origin	Type	Notes
AGM-84 Harpoon	United States	Subsonic	(183) AGM-84s – (60) 84Ls
Hsiung Feng II	Republic of China	Subsonic	Unknown, in mass production with secondary ground attack capability
Hsiung Feng III	Republic of China	Supersonic	Unknown, in mass production with secondary ground attack capability

==== CIWS ====
Name	Origin	Type	Notes
Phalanx CIWS	United States	Gun System	20mm, 7 Mk-15 delivered in 1989, 6 Mk-15 delivered in 1996, 1 Mk15 delivered in 2014, 13 Mk15 delivered in 2016, 11 Mk15 delivered in 2018
Sea Oryx	Republic of China	Missile System	Short-range missile defence system available in a 24-round launcher using off-board sensors, or an autonomous 12-round launcher with its own radar and EO/IR sensor. The system can be truck-mounted or mounted on a warship.
XTR-101/102	Republic of China	Gun System	20mm, more than 20 systems deployed in coastal defenses.

==== Torpedoes ====
Name	Origin	Type	Notes
Mark 46 torpedo	United States	Lightweight	100 delivered in 1992, 150 Mk-46 Mod-5 NEARTIP delivered in 1994, 110 Mk-46 Mod-5 NEARTIP delivered in 1998, 90 Mk-46 Mod-5 NEARTIP delivered in 2000, 41 Mk-46 Mod-5 NEARTIP delivered in 2001
Mark 54 lightweight torpedo	United States	Lightweight	168 delivered in 2017.
Mark 48 torpedo	United States	Heavyweight	46 ordered in 2018
SUT torpedo	Germany	Heavyweight	multirole, 200 delivered in 1998 from Indonesian production line

=== Gallery ===
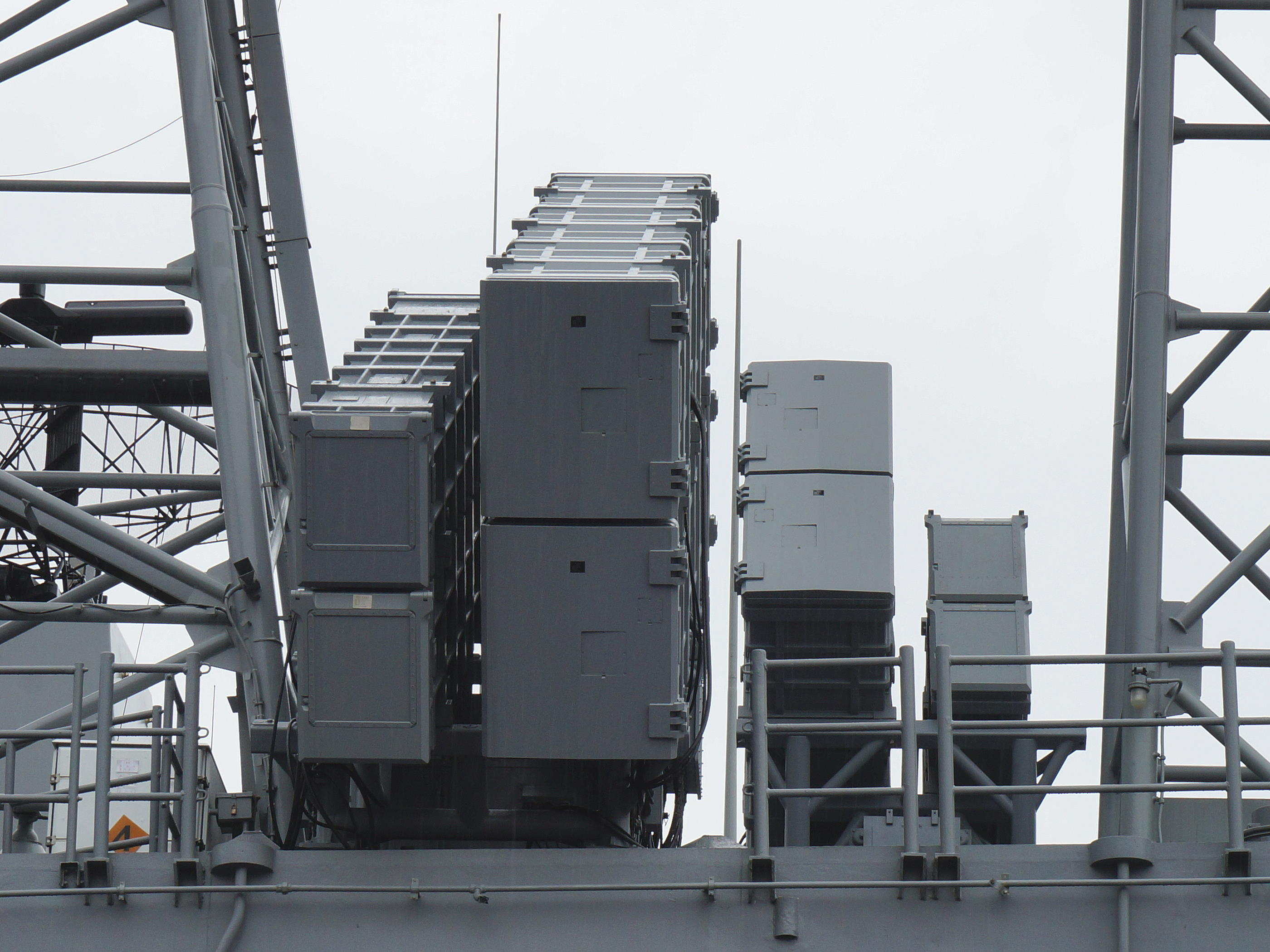
Hsiung Feng II and Hsiung Feng III launchers of Tian Dan (PFG2-1110)

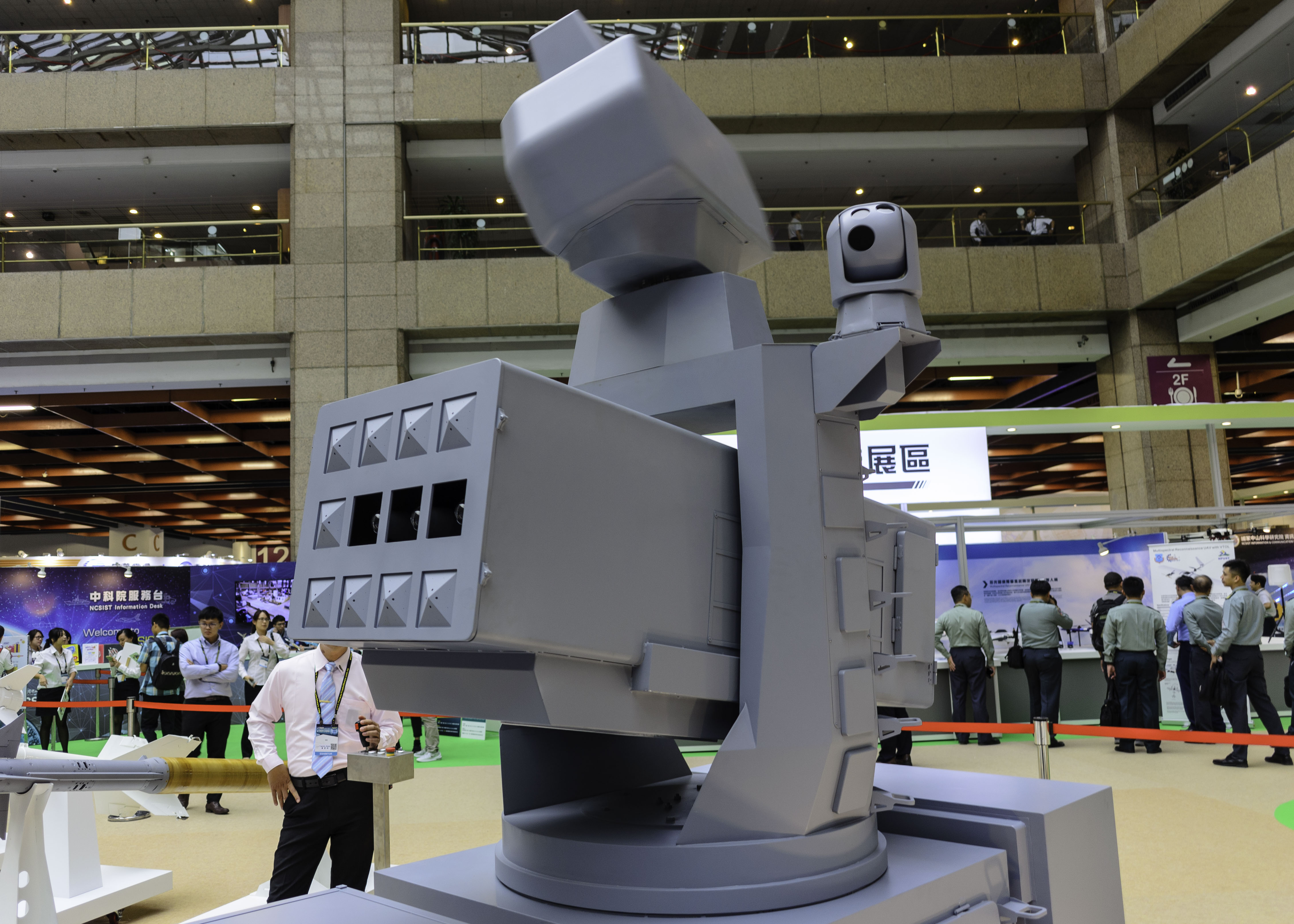
Sea Oryx missile launcher display at MND Hall 2019

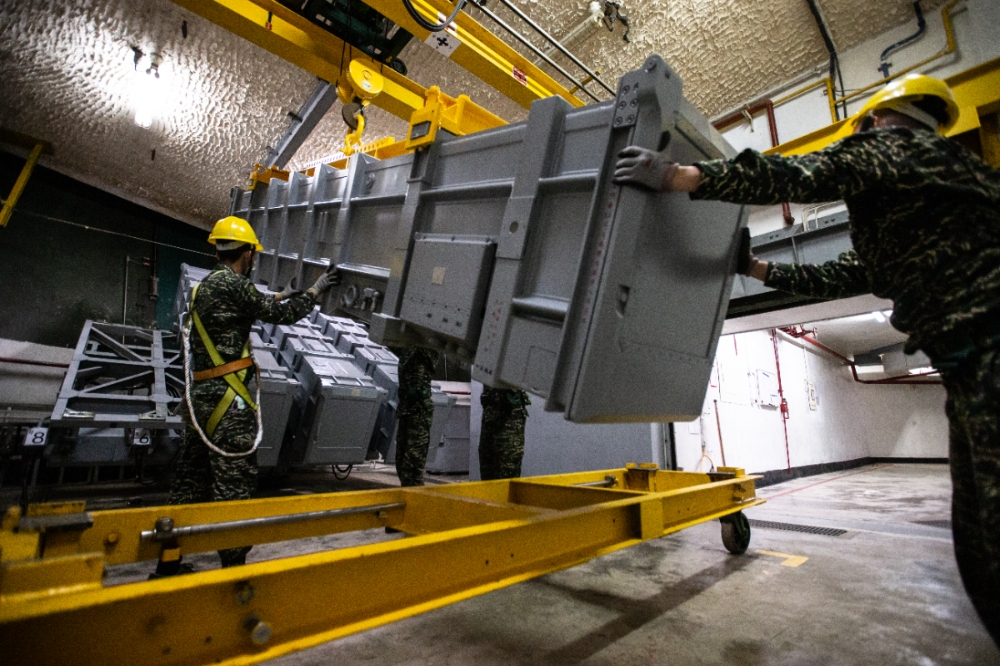
ROCN Hsiung Feng II missiles in an underground missile launch bunker

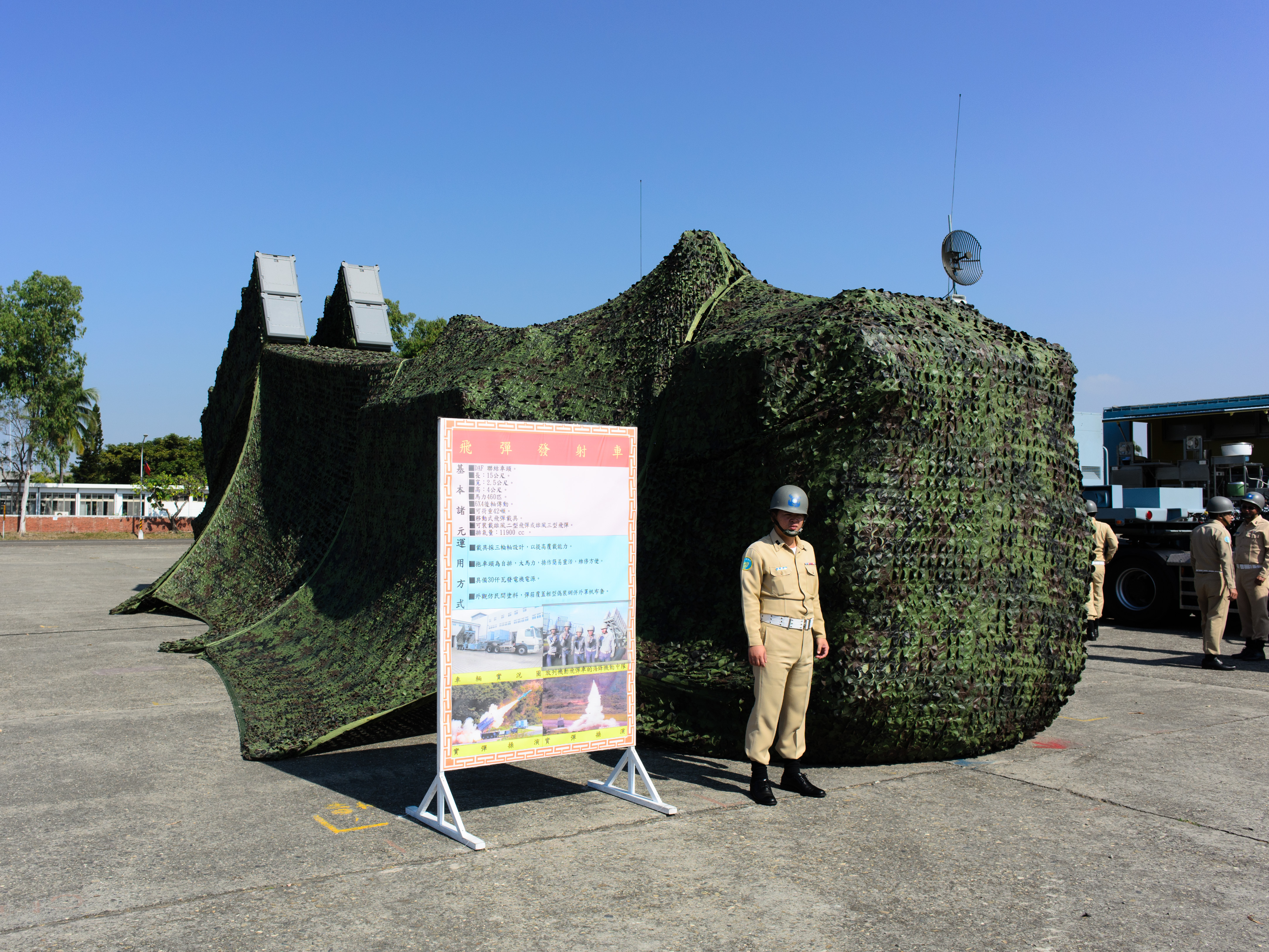
Covered ROCN Hsiung Feng II & Hsiung Feng III anti-ship missile launchers truck displayed at Zuoying Naval Base

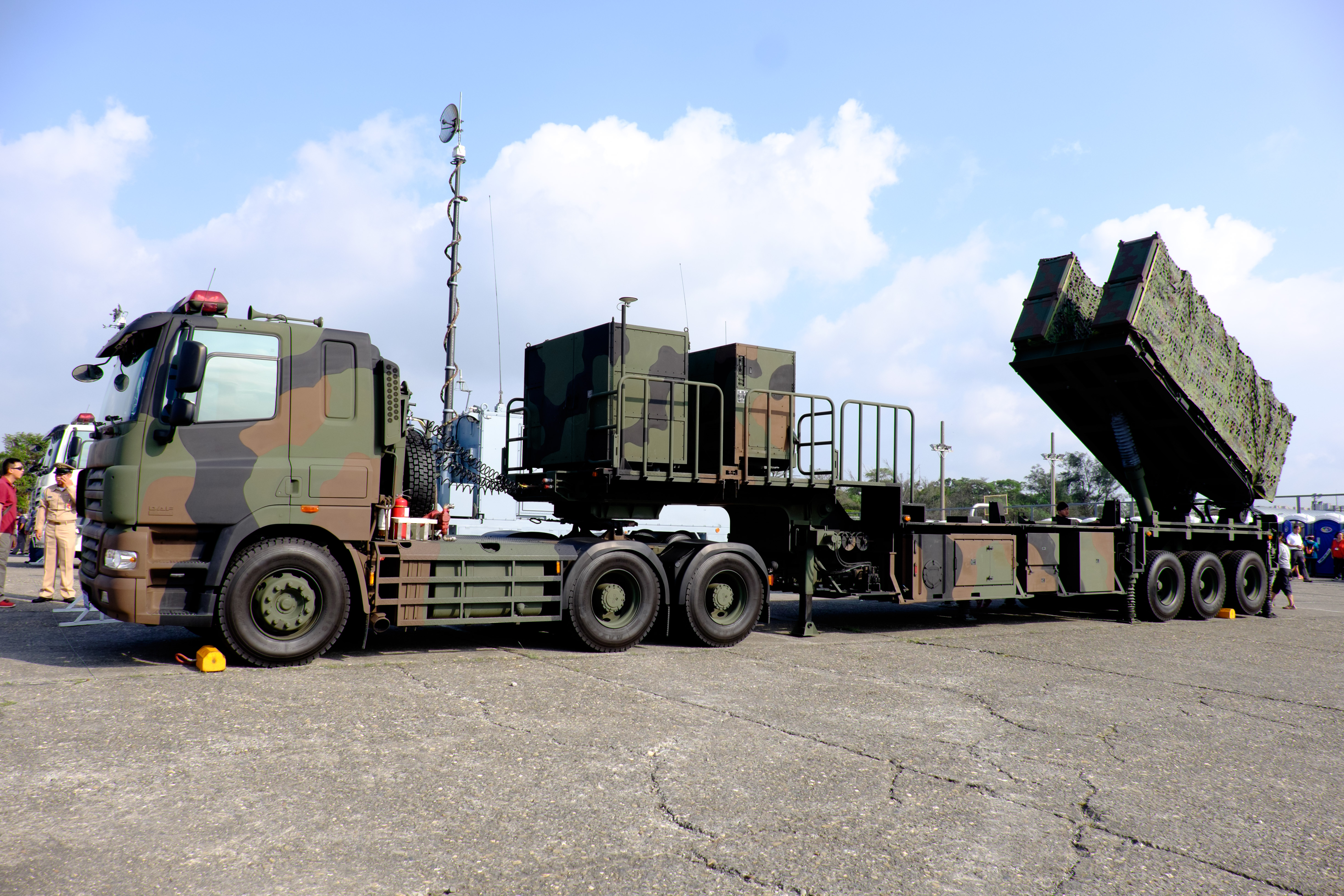
ROCN Hsiung Feng II & Hsiung Feng III anti-ship missile launchers truck

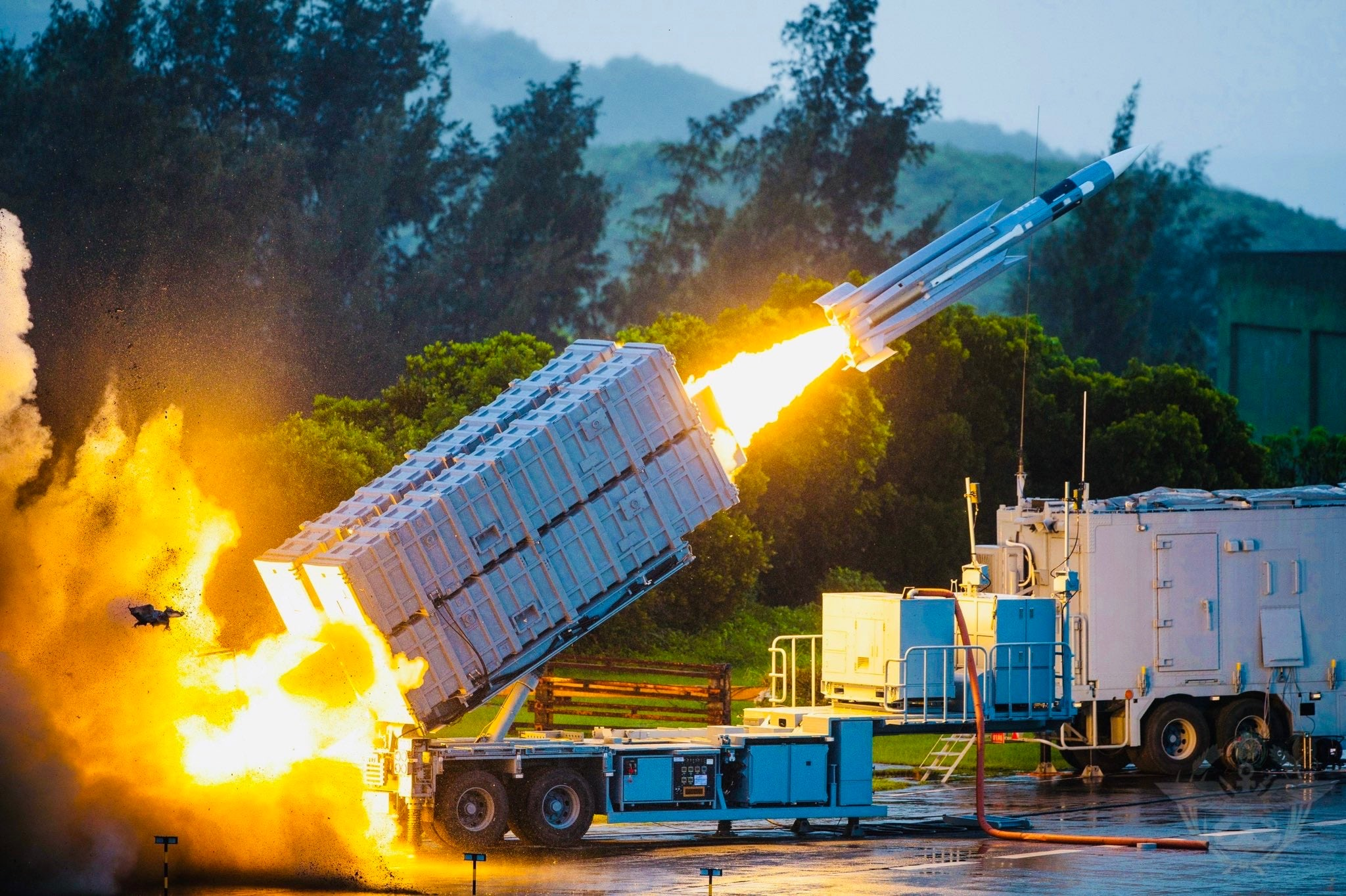
Hsiung Feng III anti-ship missile launched from a missile launchers truck

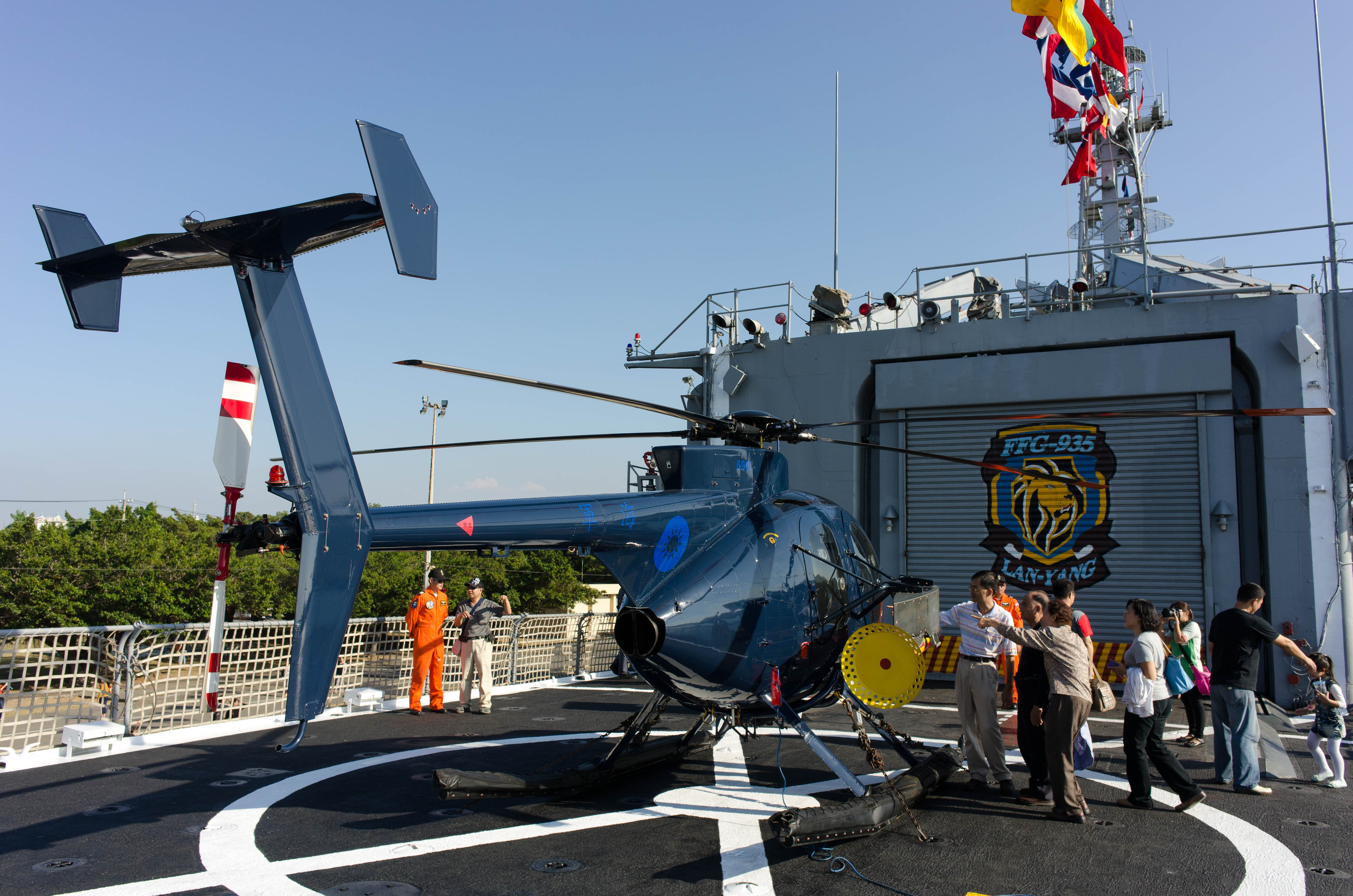
ROCN Hughes 500 "6910" carried on Lan Yang (FFG-935) helicopter deck from rear right view

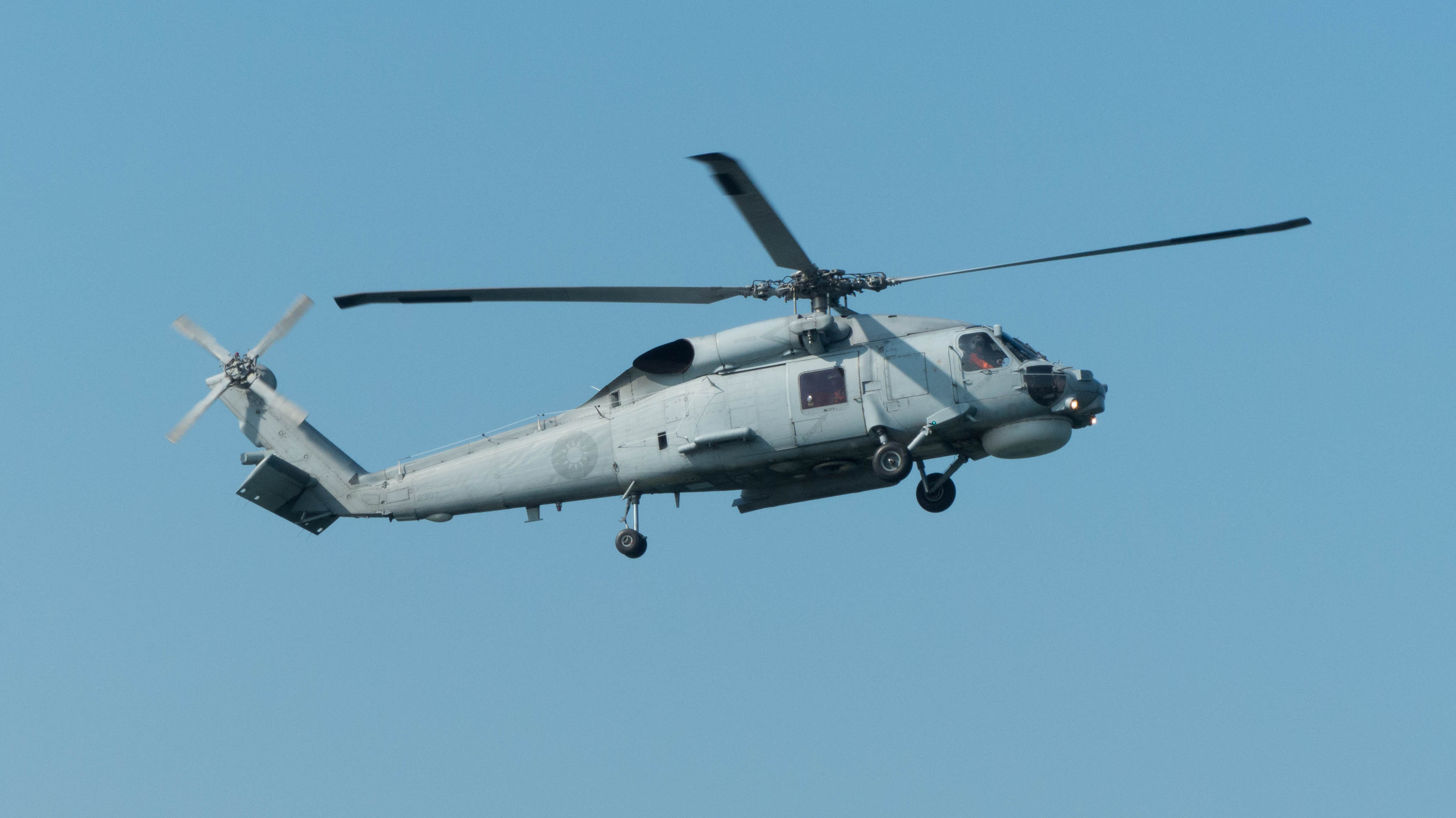
ROCN S-70C(M) "2307" flying over Zuoying Naval Base in the morning

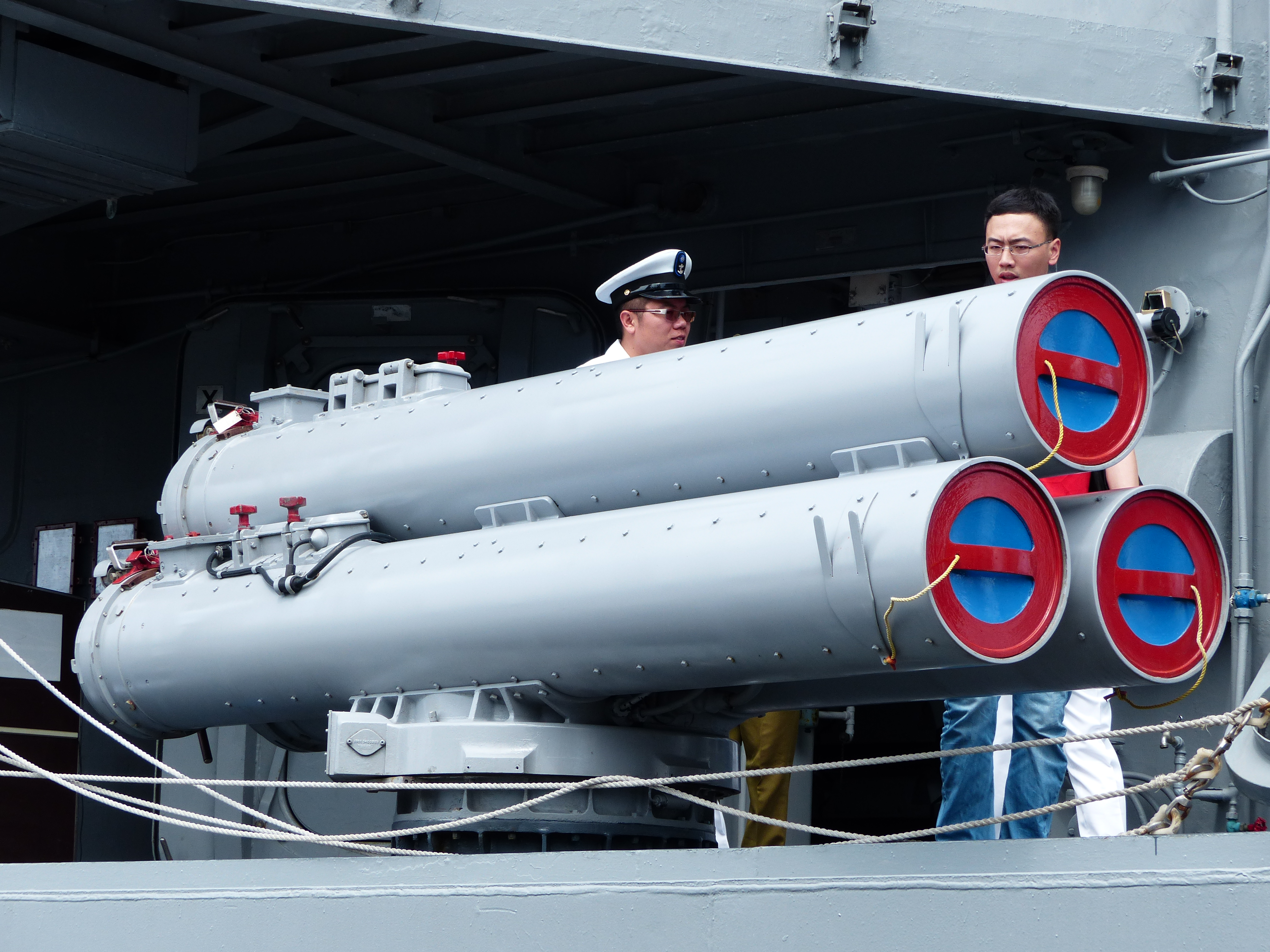
Mark 32 torpedo tubes mounted on ROCN Tzu I (PFG-1107)

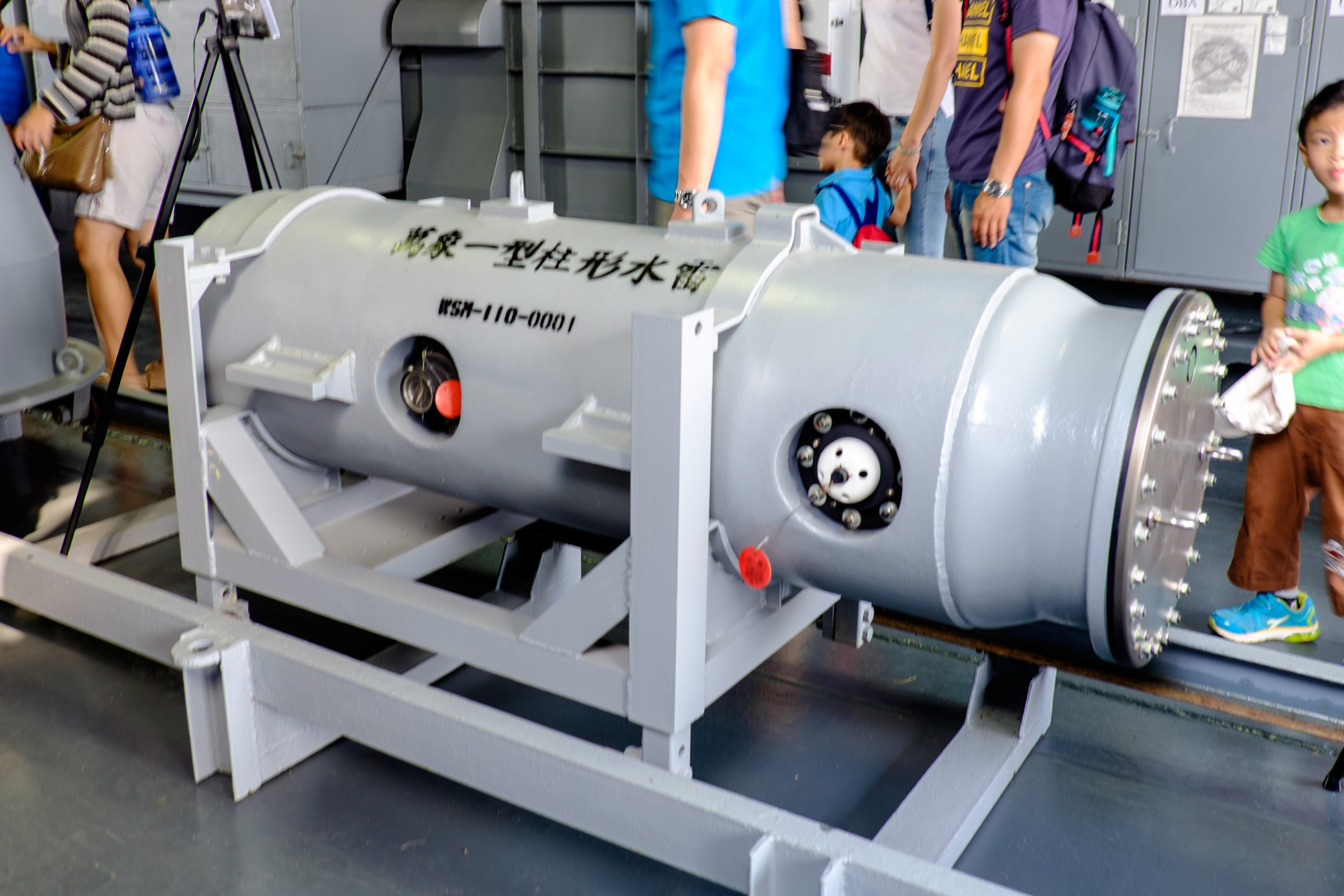
No.1 Wan Xiang CAPTOR mine displayed aboard ROCN Ho Zhong (LCU-484)

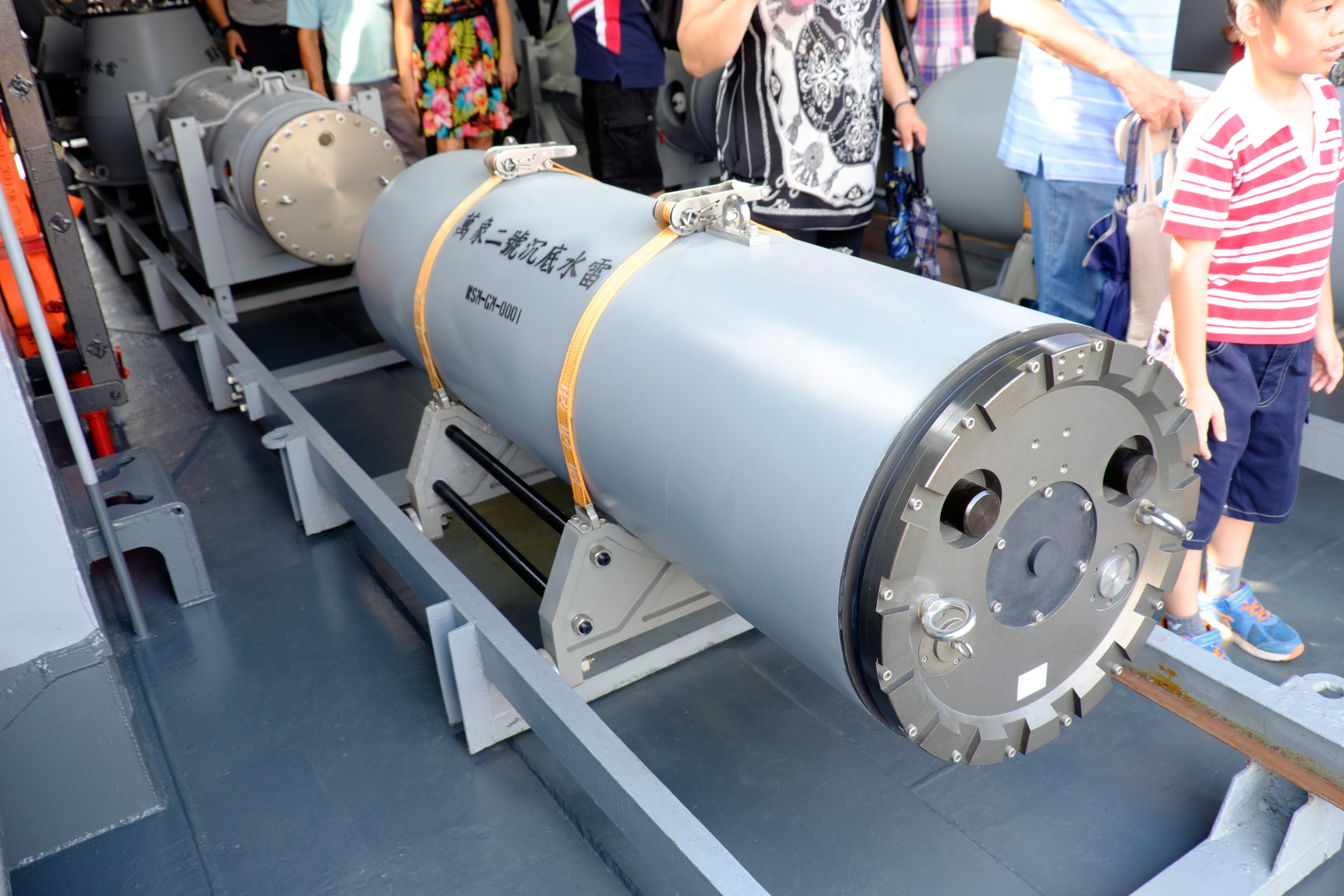
No.2 Wan Xiang Bottom mine displayed aboard ROCN Ho Zhong (LCU-484)

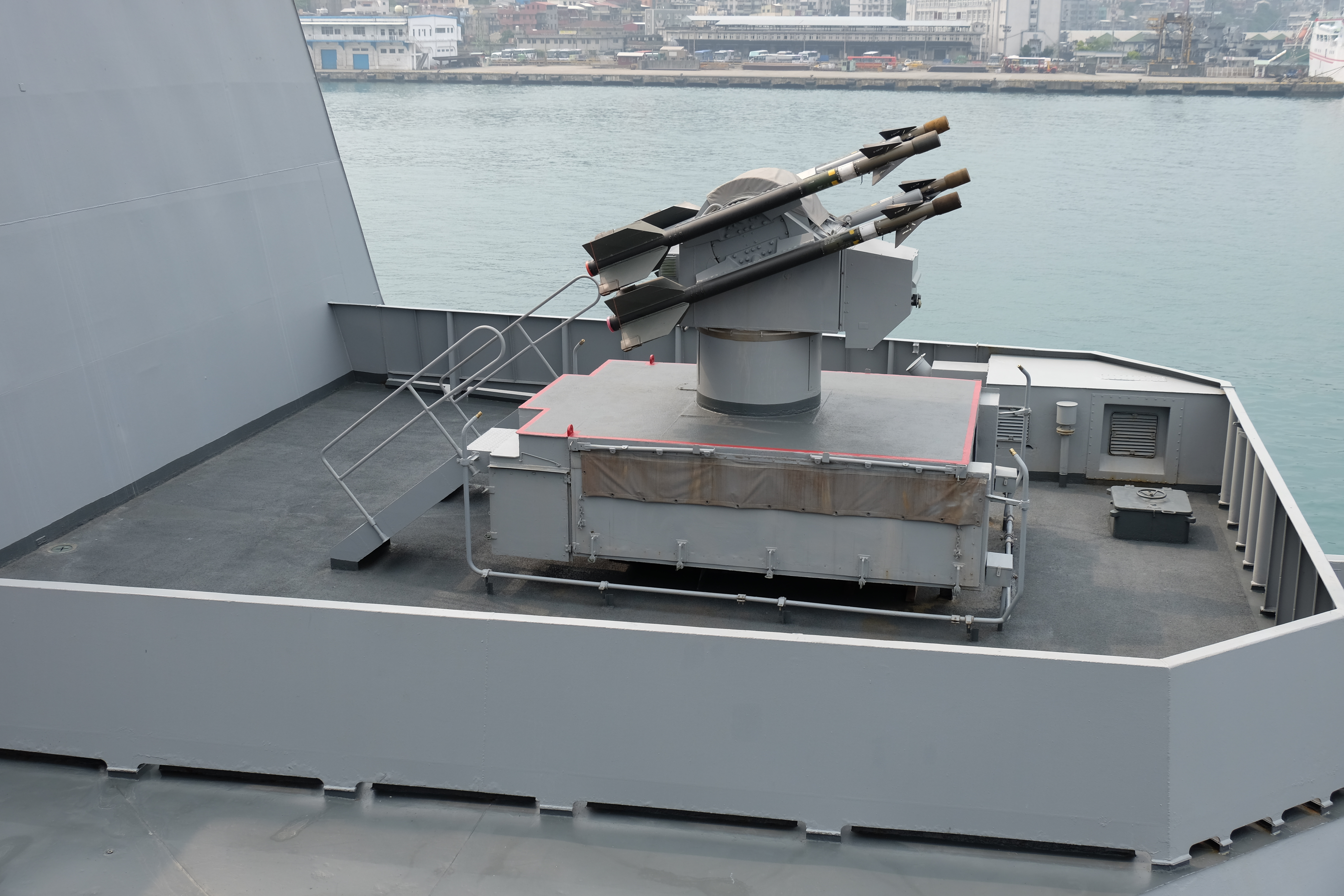
Sea Chaparral launcher mounted on ROCN Si Ning (PFG-1203)

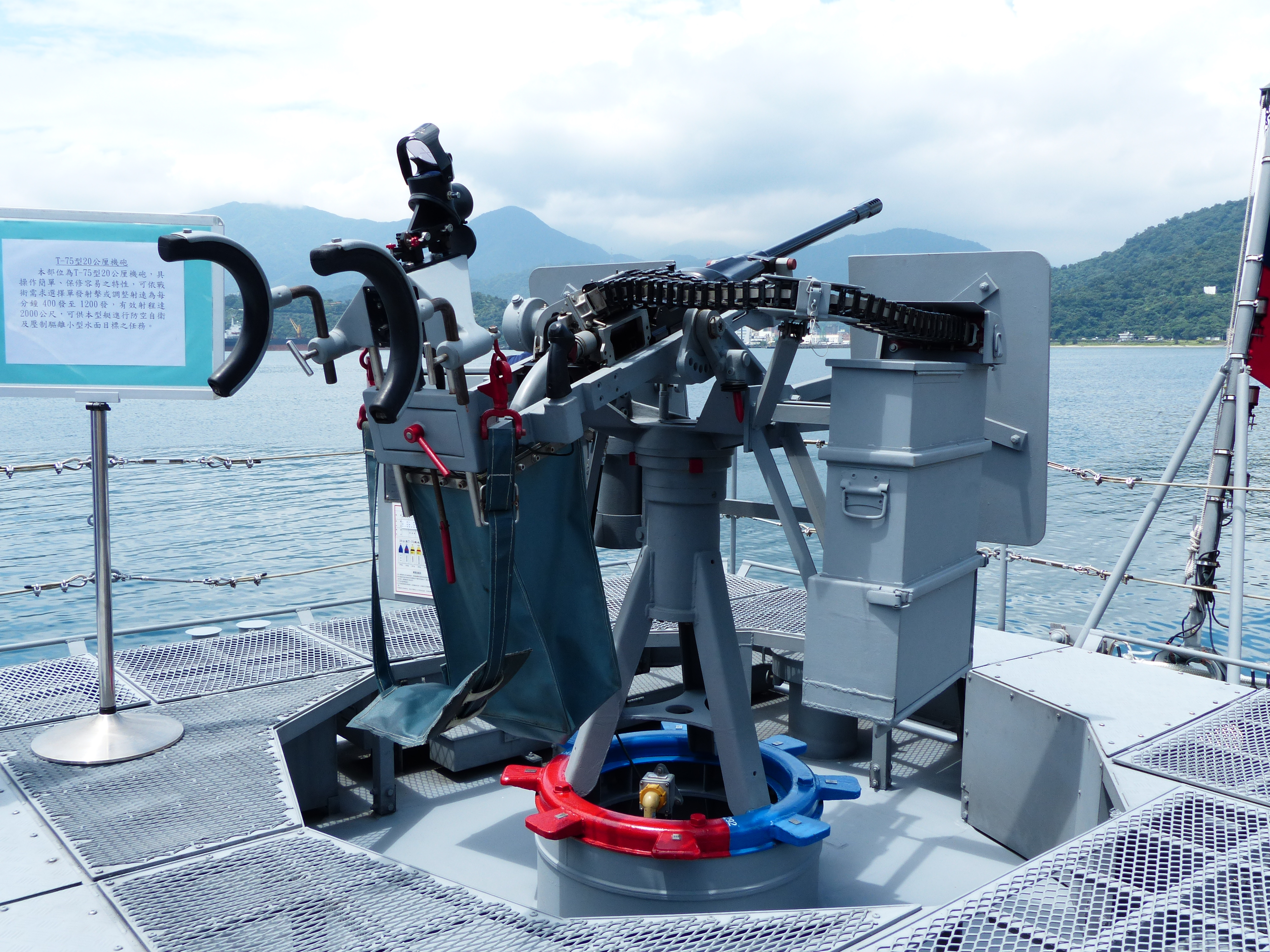
T-75S 20mm Cannon mounted on ROCS FACG-77

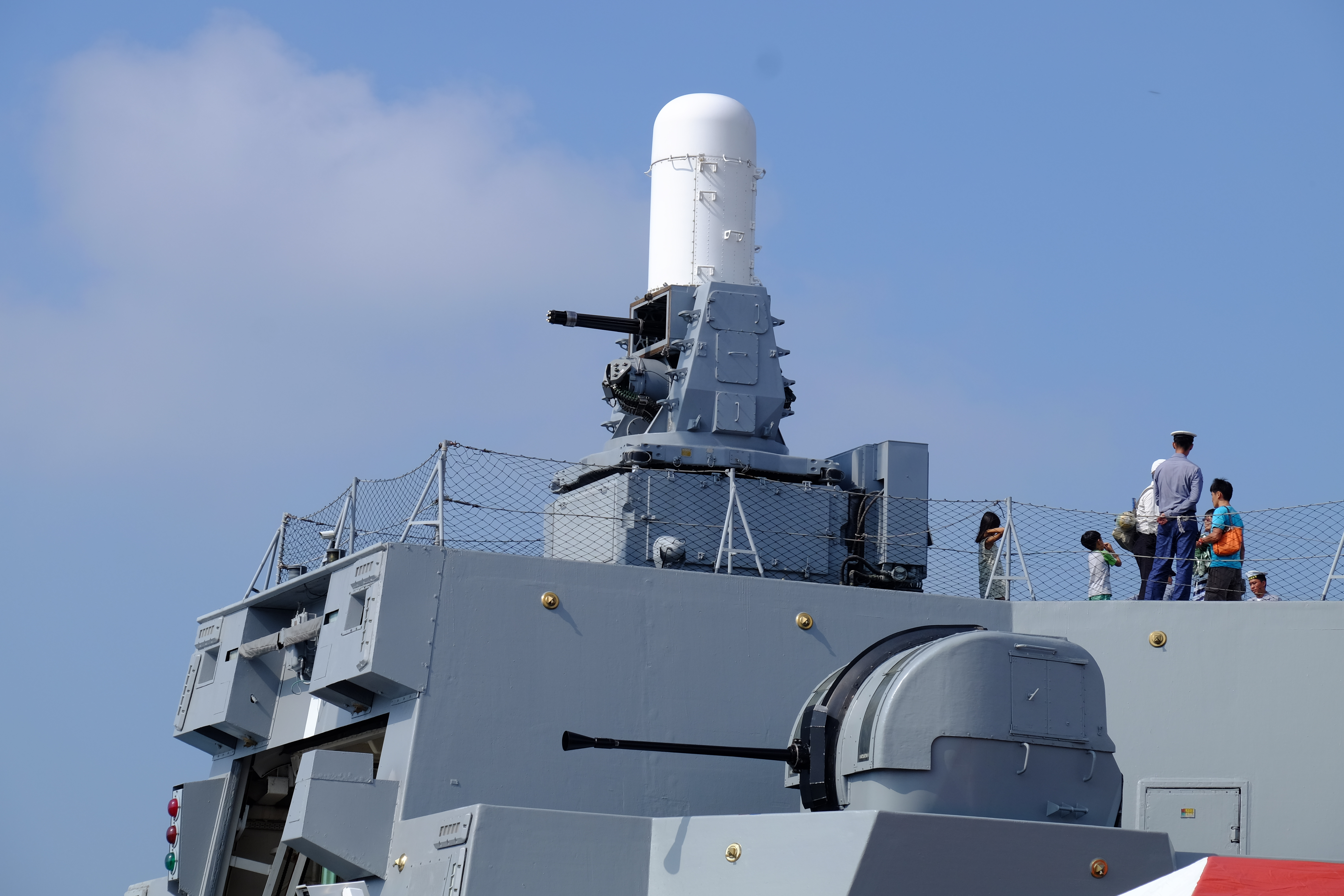
Phalanx CIWS and Bofors 40 mm L/70 gun aboard on ROCN Di Hua (PFG-1206)

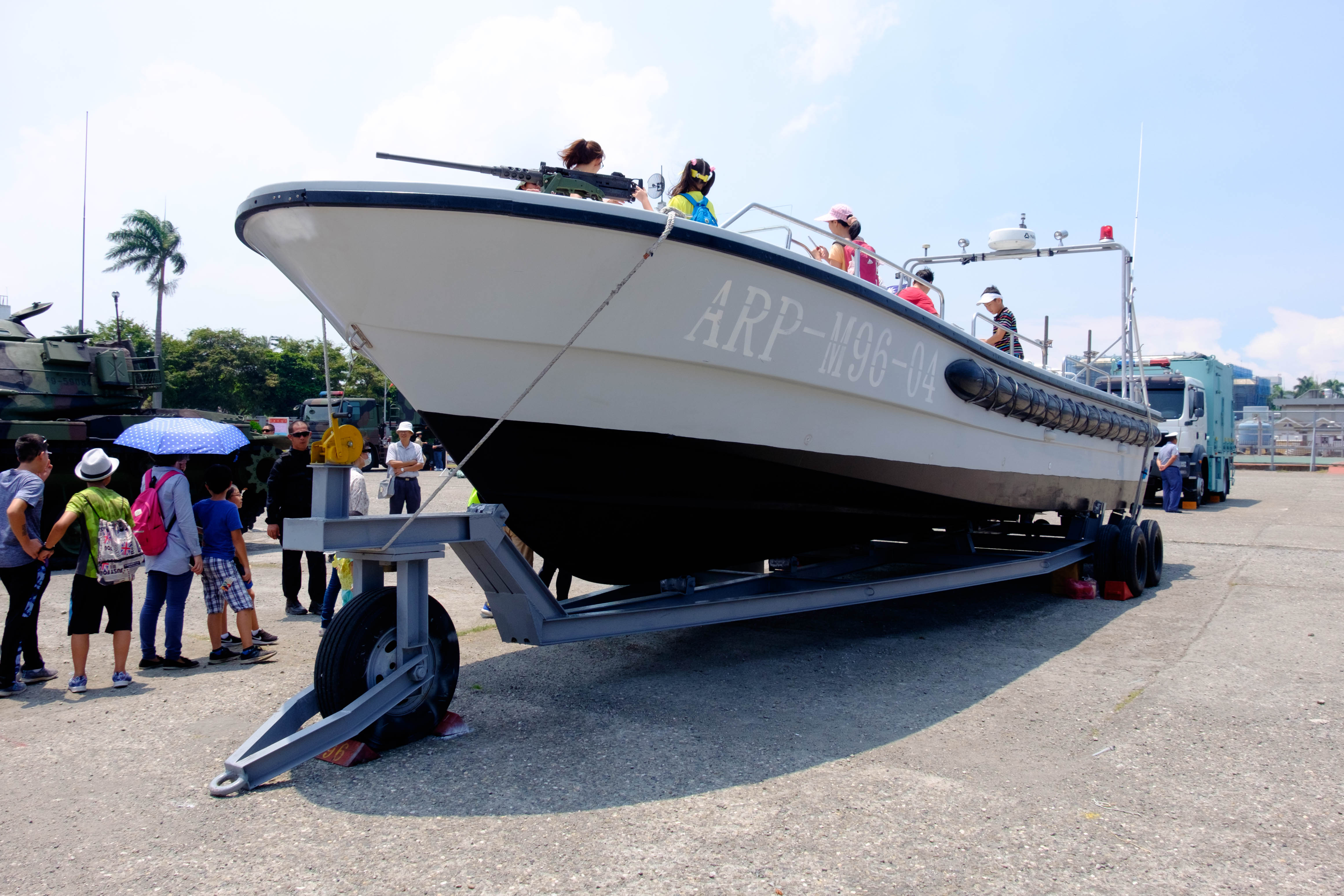
M96 motorboat

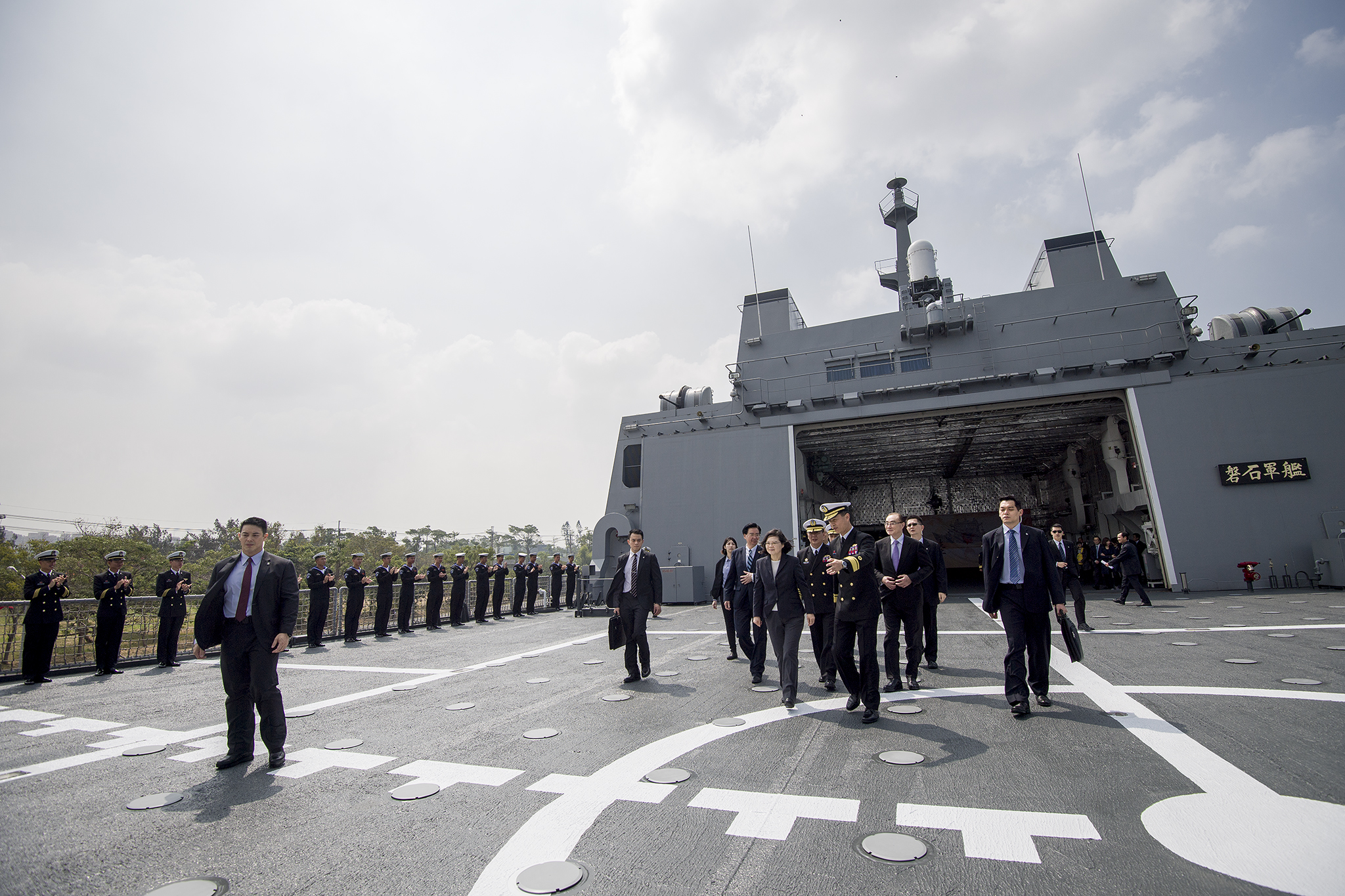
The President of Taiwan aboard the Pan Shi

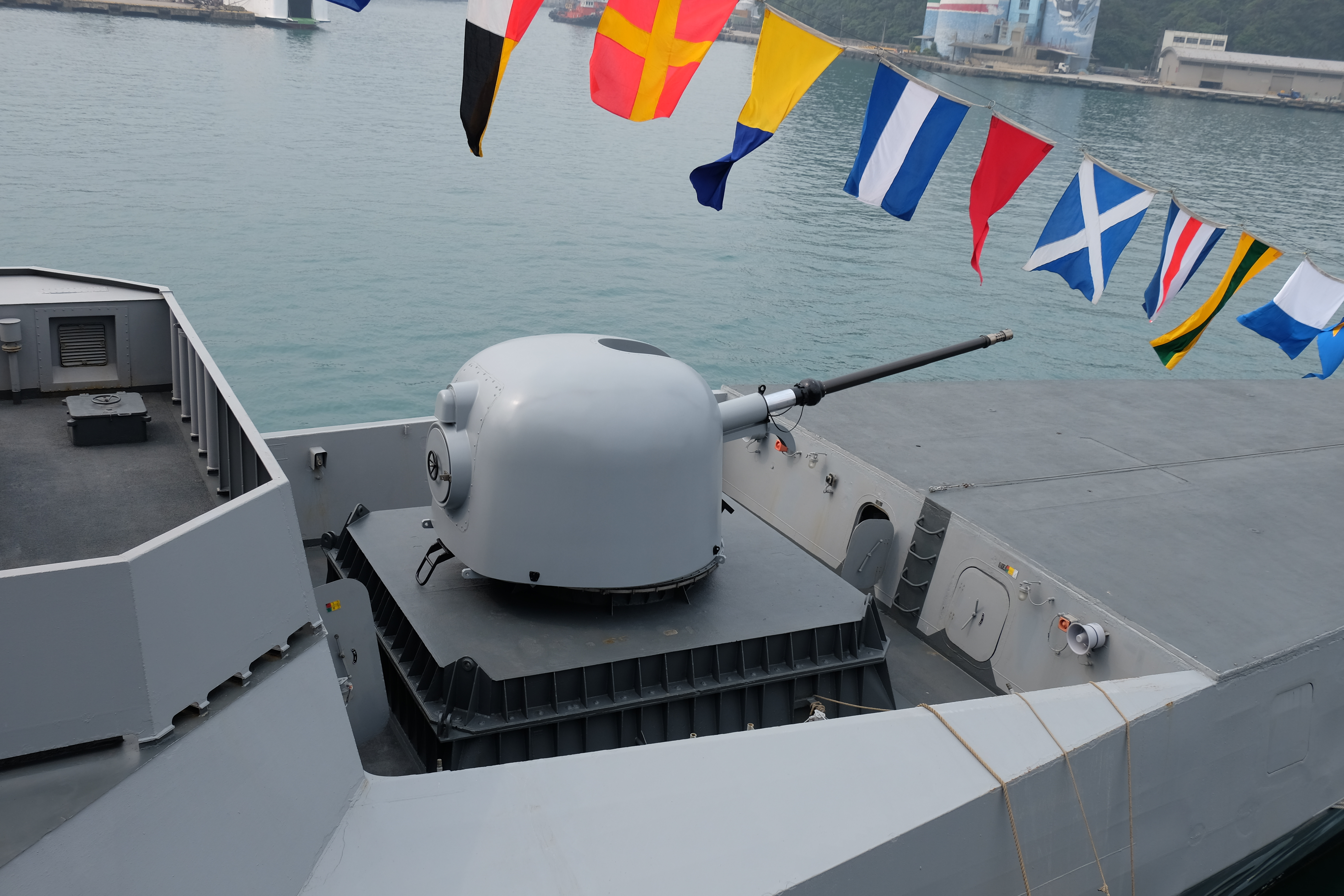
OTO Melara 76 mm gun aboard the frigate ROCN Si Ning (PFG-1203)

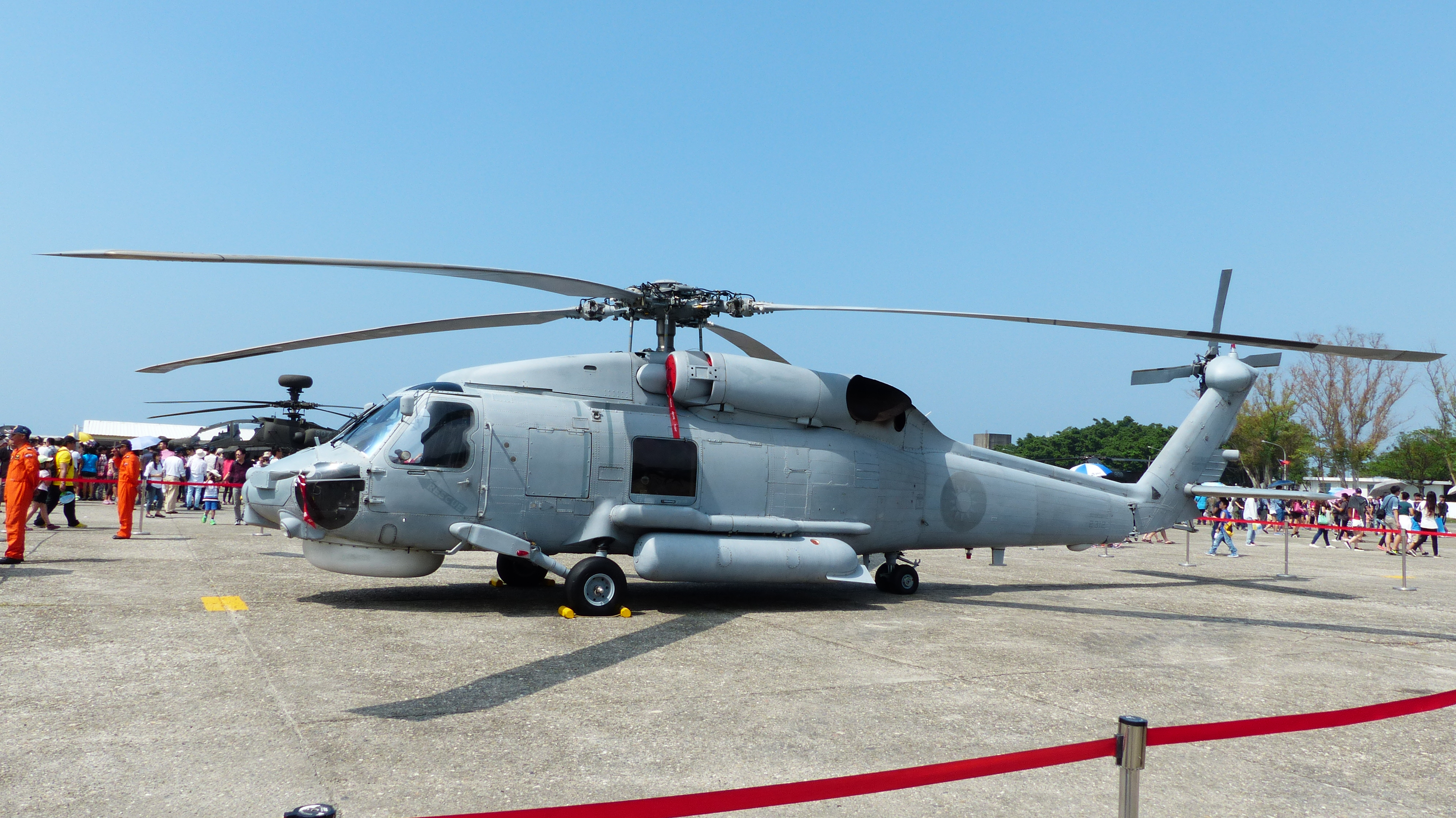
ROCN S-70C(M) "2312"

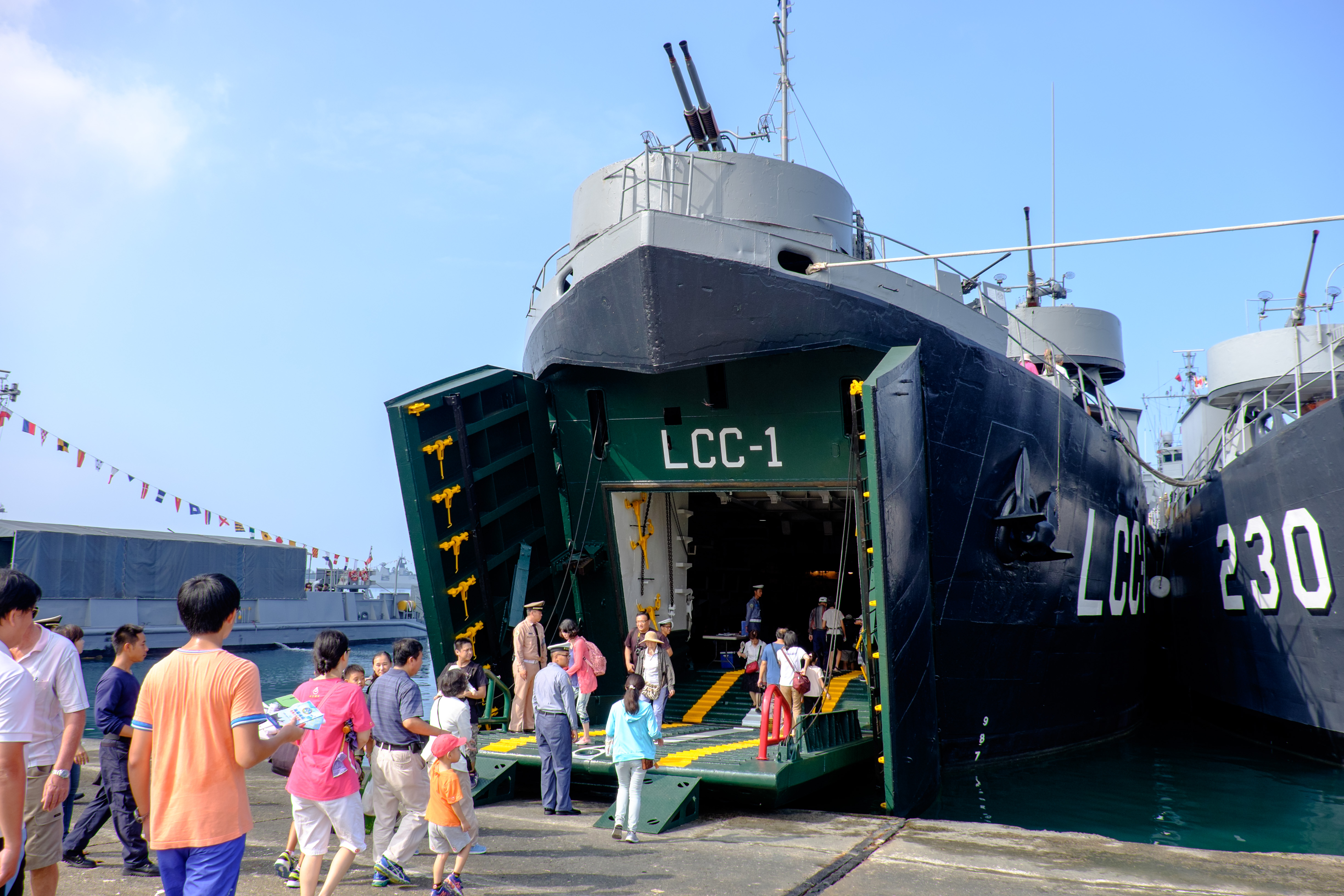
Visitors in front of ROCN Kao Hsiung (LCC-1)

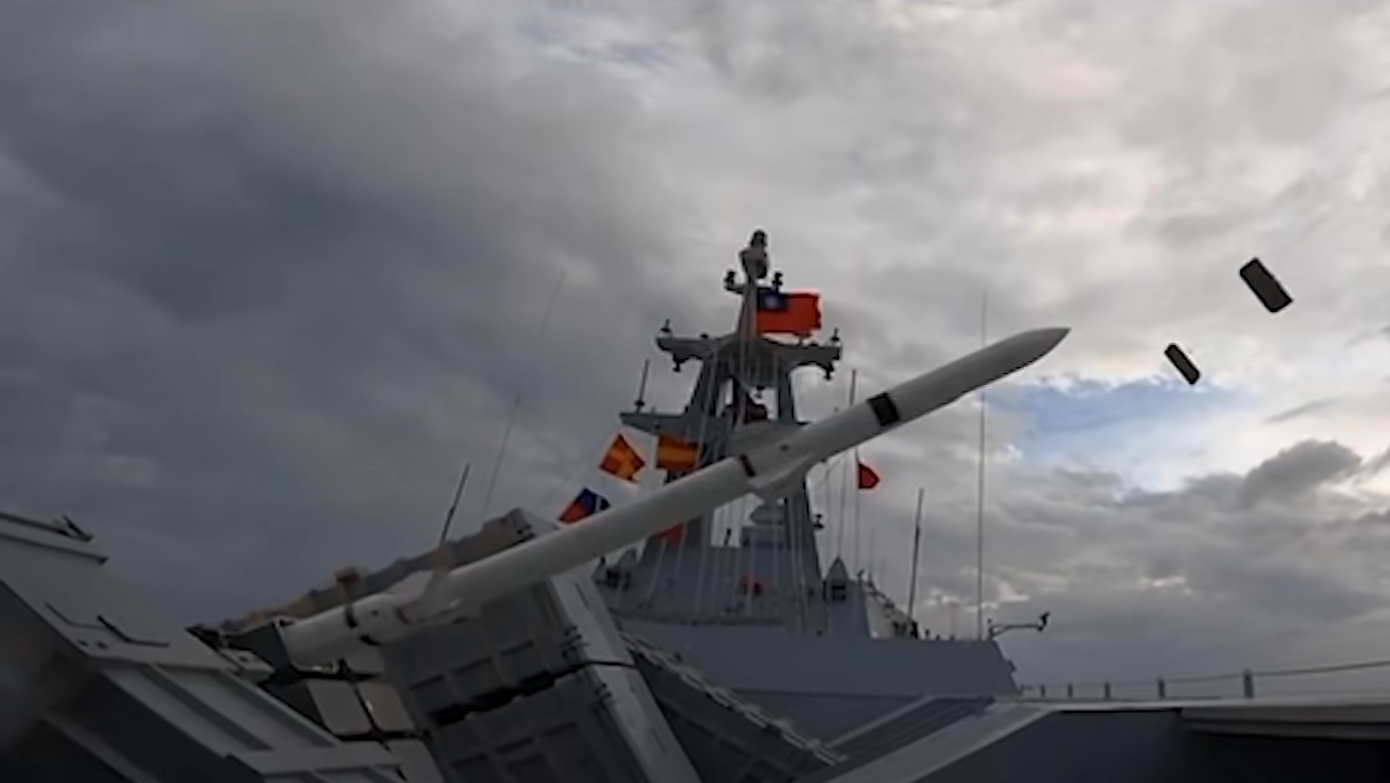
TC-2N

== Organization ==
=== Republic of China Navy Command Headquarters ===
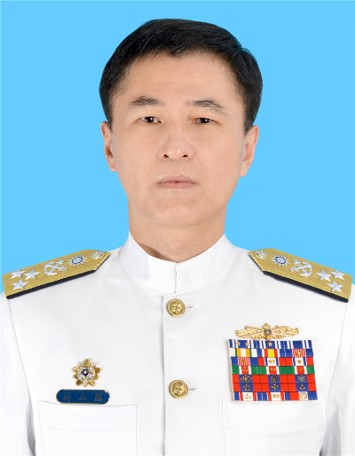
Admiral Chiang Cheng-kuo, the Commanding-General

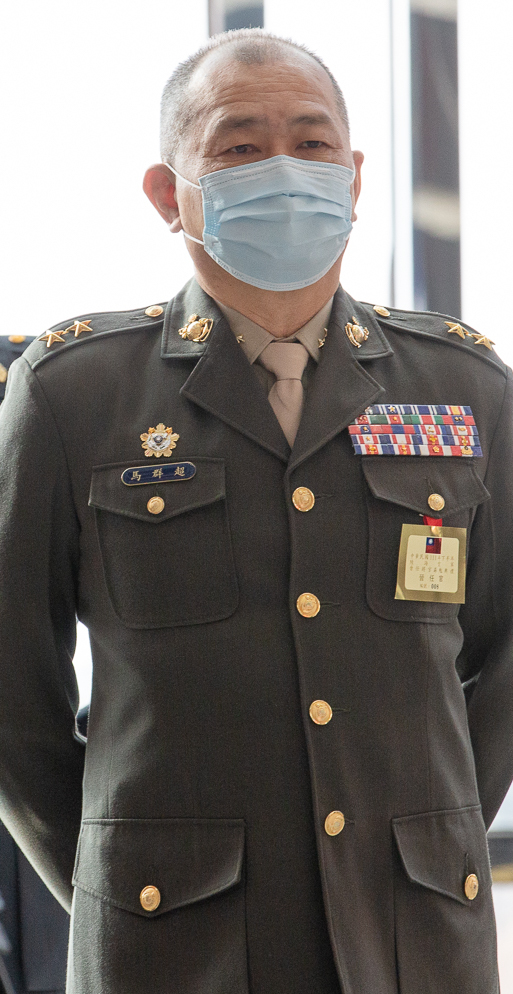
Lieutenant General Ma Qunchao, the current Deputy Commanding-General.

The Navy CHQs (中華民國國防部海軍司令部) is subordinate to the General Staff, the Minister of Defense, and the ROC President.

- Internal units: Personnel, Combat Readiness & Training, Logistics, Planning, Combat Systems, General Affairs, Comptroller, Inspector General, Political Warfare.
- Naval Fleets Command (艦隊指揮部)

- 124th Fleet: Zuoying District, Kaohsiung City

- 242nd Squadron
- 262nd Squadron

- 131st Fleet: Keelung City, Taiwan

- 212th Squadron
- 232nd Squadron
- 252nd Squadron

- 146th Fleet: Magong City, Penghu County, Taiwan

- 226th Squadron
- 268th Squadron

- Amphibious Fleet (151st Fleet), Zuoying District, Kaohsiung City

- Landing Craft Squadron
- Small Boat Squadron

- 168th Fleet: Suao, Yilan County, Taiwan

- 231st Squadron
- 251st Squadron

- 192nd Fleet (Navy Minesweeper Fleet): Zuoying District, Kaohsiung City

- 216th Squadron
- 236th Squadron
- 248th Squadron

- 256th Submarine Squadron: Zuoying District, Kaohsiung City
- Hai Feng First Shore Based Anti-ship Missile Group (海鋒第1大隊)
- Hai Feng Second Shore Based Anti-ship Missile Group (海鋒第2大隊)
- Hai Feng Third Shore Based Anti-ship Missile Group (海鋒第3大隊)
- Hai Feng Fourth Shore Based Anti-ship Missile Group (海鋒第4大隊)

- operates 6 batteries of fixed HF-2 anti-ship missiles.
- operates 7 batteries of mobile HF-2 or HF-3 anti-ship missiles.
- support squadron
- 7th Hai Feng Shore Based Anti-ship Missile Squadron (海鋒大隊第七中隊), Hualien, Eastern Taiwan.

- Naval Antisubmarine Aviation Command (operates from Pingtung, Tsoying, and Hualien AB)

- 701st Helicopter Squadron (Light), S-70C(M)-1, at Hualien.
- 702nd Helicopter Squadron (Light), S-70C(M)-2, at Tsoying.
- 501st Helicopter Squadron (Light), 500MD ASW, at Tsoying.
- Maintenance Group

- 1st Maintenance Squadron (Pingtung)
- 2nd Maintenance Squadron (Tsoying)
- 3rd Maintenance Squadron (Hualien)

- Ocean Surveillance Command(海洋監偵指揮部)

- 1st Maintenance Squadron
- 2nd Maintenance Squadron
- 3rd Maintenance Squadron

- Littoral Combatant Command (濱海作戰指揮部)
- Marine Corps Command (陸戰隊指揮部)
- Education, Training and Doctrine Command (教育訓練暨準則發展司令部)
- Logistics Command (後勤司令部)
- Naval Academy, Hydrographic & Oceanographic Bureau, Shipbuilding Development Center, Communication Systems, General Service.

== Bases ==
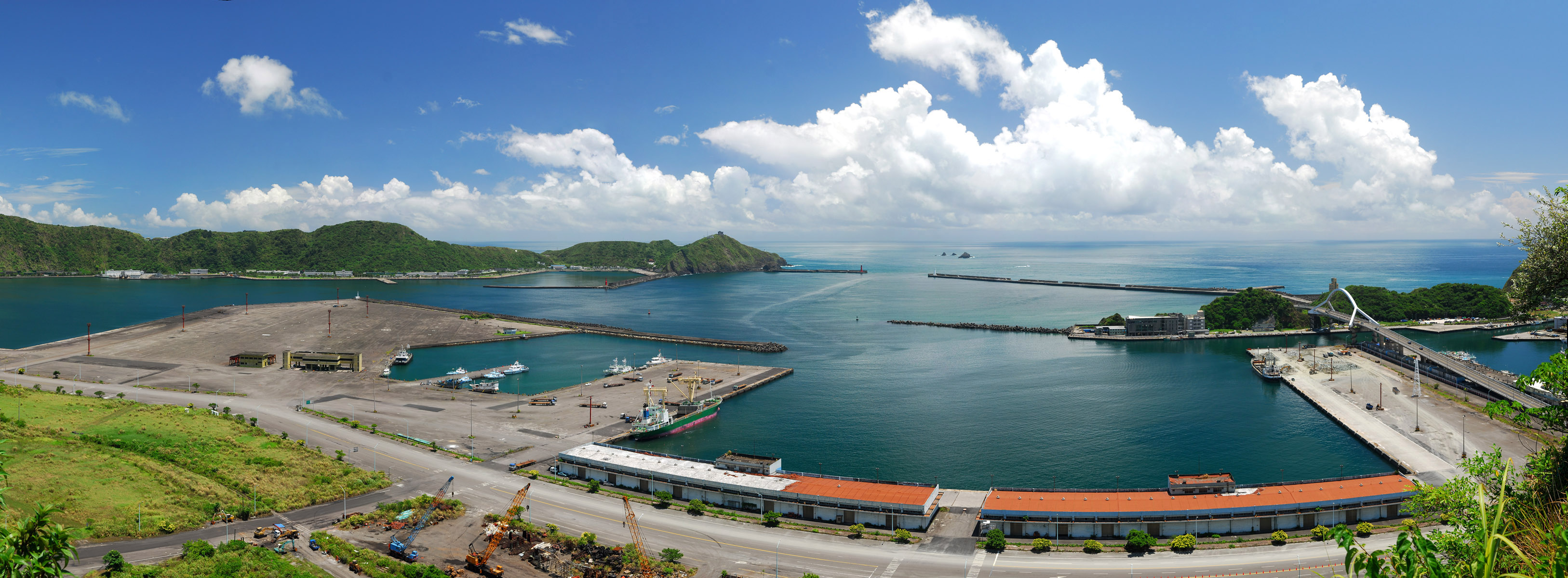
SuAo Bay Panorama

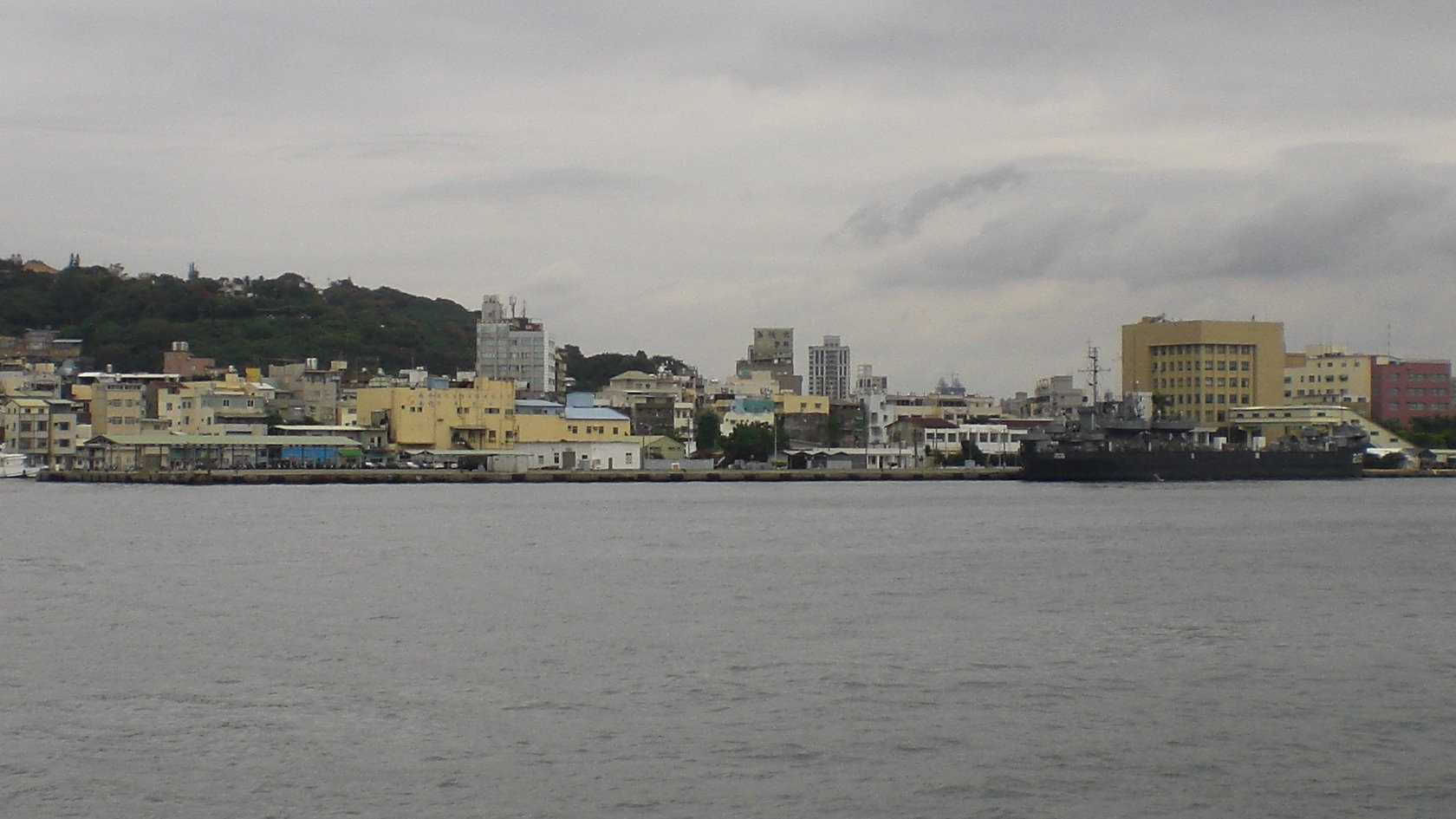
ROCN Xinbin Camp with 205

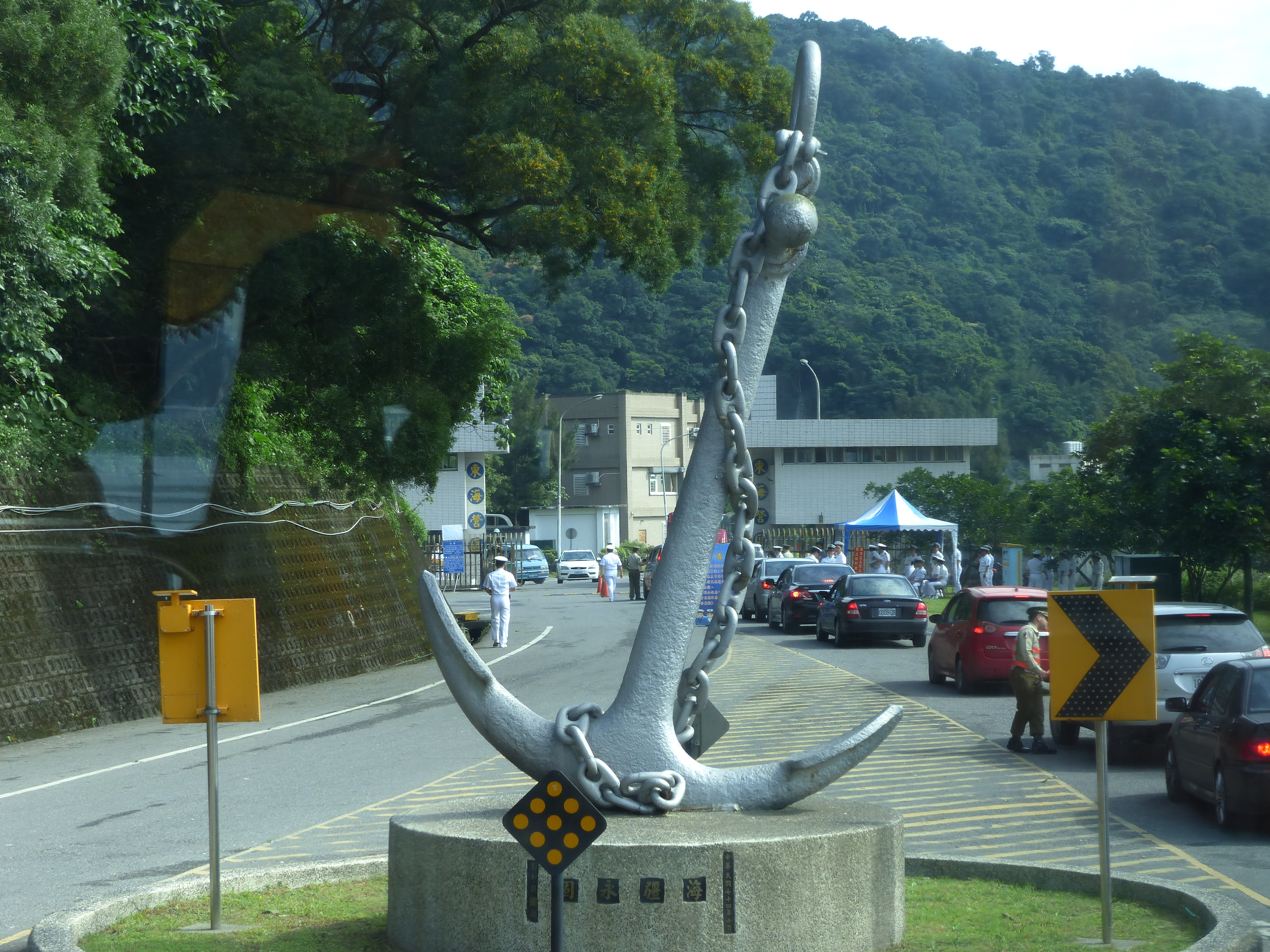
Anchor in Entrance Road of Zhongzheng Naval Base

- Zuoying Naval Base – 1st Naval District HQ, largest naval base in Taiwan – Zuoying District, Kaohsiung
- Makung Naval Base (Makung, Pescadores) – 2nd Naval District HQ – home to attack squadrons, training centre and naval yard
- Keelung Naval Base, Keelung – 3rd Naval District HQ, home to northern patrol and transport squadrons and small naval yard
- Suao Naval Base, Su-ao, Yilan – East Coast Command and supports Keelung Naval Base

All remaining bases are small naval stations supporting PCL class small patrol boats and Fast Attack Boat:

- Anping Naval Base, Anping
- Hsinchu Naval Base, Hsinchu
- Hualien Naval Base, Hualien
- Kenting Naval Base, Hengchun
- Tamshui Naval Base, Tamshui
- Wu Chi Naval Base, Wuqi District

In 2017 the Navy embarked on a major expansion of the Zuoying naval base. Under the name Weihai Project (威海) the expansion was given a budget of more than a billion US dollars.

== Naval Maritime and Surveillance Command ==
The Naval Maritime and Surveillance Command oversees a network of surveillance radar stations across Taiwan. These include high altitude sites like Hsiaohsuehshan which is located at more than 3,000m above sea level. The high altitude sites pose unique challenges to the Navy as they are often located in inaccessible areas and experience extreme weather including months of snow in the winter.

In May 2021 the navy ordered a new series of shore based medium-to-long range maritime surveillance radars from NCSIST. Because the radar system will likely come under attack in a war the navy has been pulling staff back to central command centers.

== See also ==
- List of Republic of China Navy ships
- Ministry of National Defense (Republic of China)
- Republic of China Naval Academy
- Coast Guard Administration (Taiwan)
- Political status of Taiwan
- People's Liberation Army Navy (PLAN) – The naval forces of the People's Republic of China (PRC)
- Republic of China Navy rank and rating insignia for the rank and rating system of the ROCN (Including the Marine Corps)
- Maritime industries of Taiwan
- Taiwan frigate scandal
