= Lin Baoyi =

Lin Baoyi may refer to:

- Lin Baoyi (admiral) (1863–1927), Chinese admiral during the warlord era
- Bowie Lam (born 1965), Chinese name Lin Baoyi, Hong Kong actor
