= Yushan-class landing platform dock =

Taiwanese amphibious warfare vessel

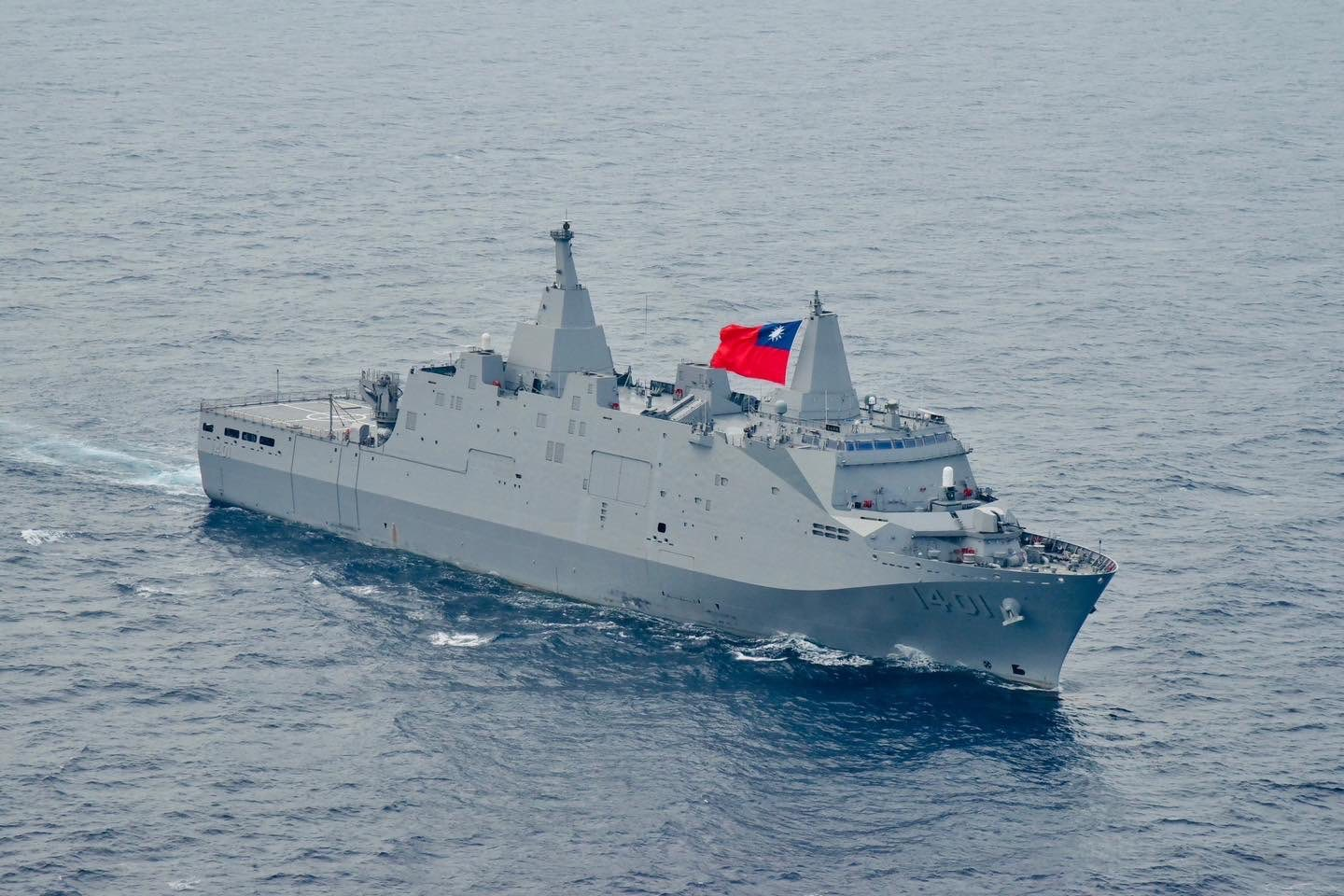
- ROCS Yushan sailing on the sea.

Class overview
- Name: Yushan class
- Builders: CSBC Corporation, Taiwan
- Operators: Republic of China Navy
- Preceded by: ROCS Hsu Hai
- In commission: 2023-Present
- Planned: 4
- Completed: 1

General characteristics
- Type: Landing platform dock
- Displacement: 10,600 t (10,400 long tons) standard
- Length: 153 m (502 ft)
- Beam: 23 m (75 ft)
- Draught: 6.1 m (20 ft)
- Propulsion: 4x MAN 16V28/33 D STC
- Speed: 22.1 knots (40.9 km/h)
- Range: 7,000 mi (11,000 km)
- Boats & landing craft carried: 4 × LCMs; 1 × LCU ; and; 9 × AAV7 amphibious APCs
- Capacity: 483 marines
- Complement: 190 officers and soldiers
- Armament: 4 × missile launchers for 32 Hai Chien SAMs; 1 × 76 mm OTO Melara gun; 2 × 20 mm Phalanx CIWS; 2 × 20 mm T-75 gun
- Aircraft carried: 2 × Black Hawk or Seahawk helicopters
- Aviation facilities: Flight deck, two hangars

The Yushan-class landing platform dock (Chinese: 玉山級兩棲船塢運輸艦) is a class of landing platform dock built by CSBC Corporation, Taiwan for the Republic of China Navy (ROCN). Four ships are planned, with one ship launched in April 2021.

== Description ==
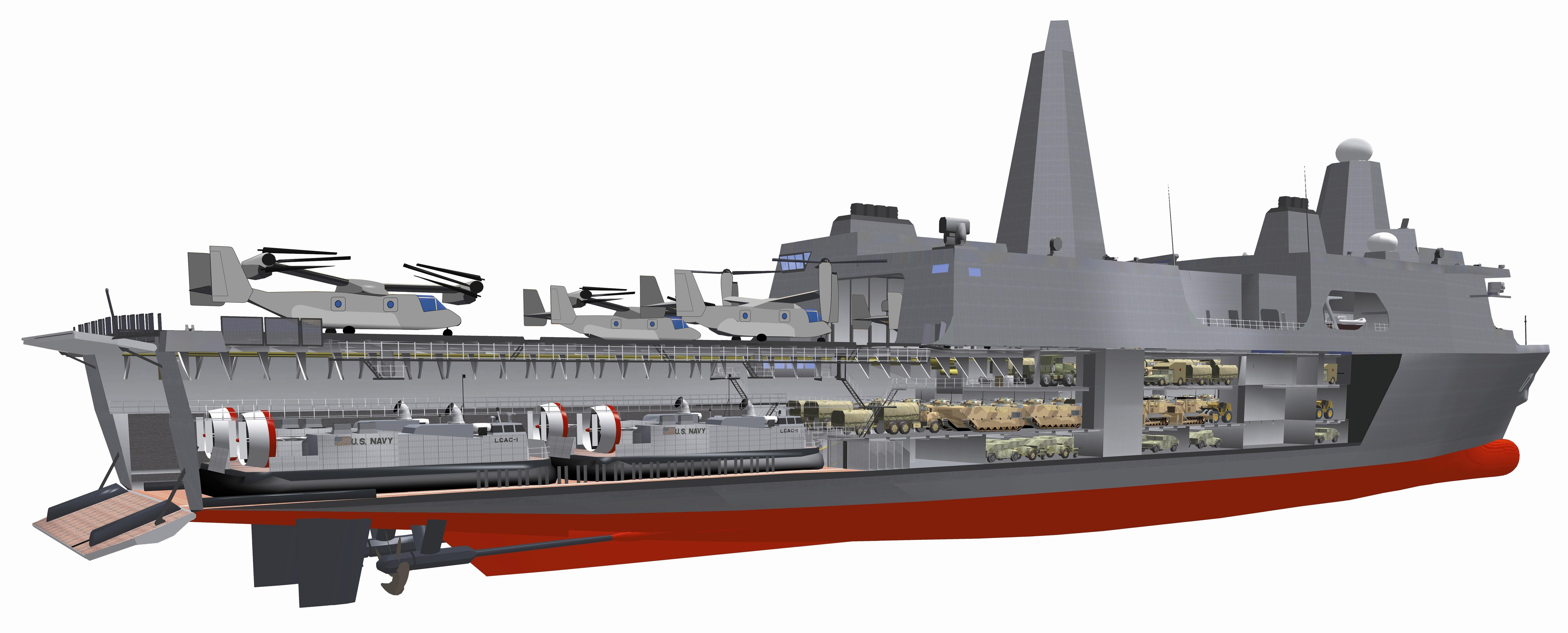
The Yushan class is heavily inspired by the San Antonio class shown here

Yushan-class ships have a length of 153 m (502 ft), a beam of 23 m (75 ft), and their standard displacement is 10,000 t (9,800 long tons). The class has a draught of 6.1 m (20 ft), maximum speed of 22.1 knots (40.9 km/h) and range of 7,000 mi (11,000 km).

The ships are able to carry several AAV7 amphibious APCs along with 673 troops. The ships also has a single flight deck with two hangars able to accommodate Sikorsky UH-60 Black Hawk or the naval Sikorsky SH-60 Seahawk helicopters.

The class is unusually well armed for a landing platform dock with a 76 mm gun, two Phalanx CIWS, and two modular missile launchers of either 8 Hsiung Feng II surface-to-surface missiles or 32 Hai Chien surface-to-air missiles. They also have radar signature reducing features and electromagnetic pulse protection.

The lead ship of the class cost $4.635 billion NTD (US$163 million).

The class is intended to fill both military and humanitarian roles, as a command ship for amphibious operations, a mothership for the ROCN's small landing boats, and a general logistics transport capable of supplying islands without harbor facilities.

== History ==
The Yushan class is intended to maintain the inventory of the ROCN's land platform docks at two ships. The lead ship of the class will fill the void left by the retirement of the ROCS Chung Cheng (formerly USS Comstock), while a planned second ship will replace the ROCS Hsu Hai (formerly USS Pensacola), which served in the Republic of China Navy since 1999.

Design efforts began in early 2015 and were unveiled on 15 May 2016. The keel of the lead vessel was laid in June 2020. Yushan was launched in April 2021, the launch ceremony was attended by President Tsai Ing-wen and Defense Minister Chiu Kuo-cheng. President Tsai described the vessel as a “milestone” on Taiwan's journey to naval shipbuilding self-sufficiency.

The first ship of the class, Yushan, began her sea trials on 7 July 2022. The ship was delivered on 30 September 2022 by CSBC Corporation, Taiwan. Yushan was commissioned in June 2023.

== Ships of class ==
Pennant Number	Name	Builder	Launched	Commissioned	Status
LPD-1401	Yushan	CSBC Corporation, Taiwan	12 April 2021	19 June 2023	Active

== Gallery ==
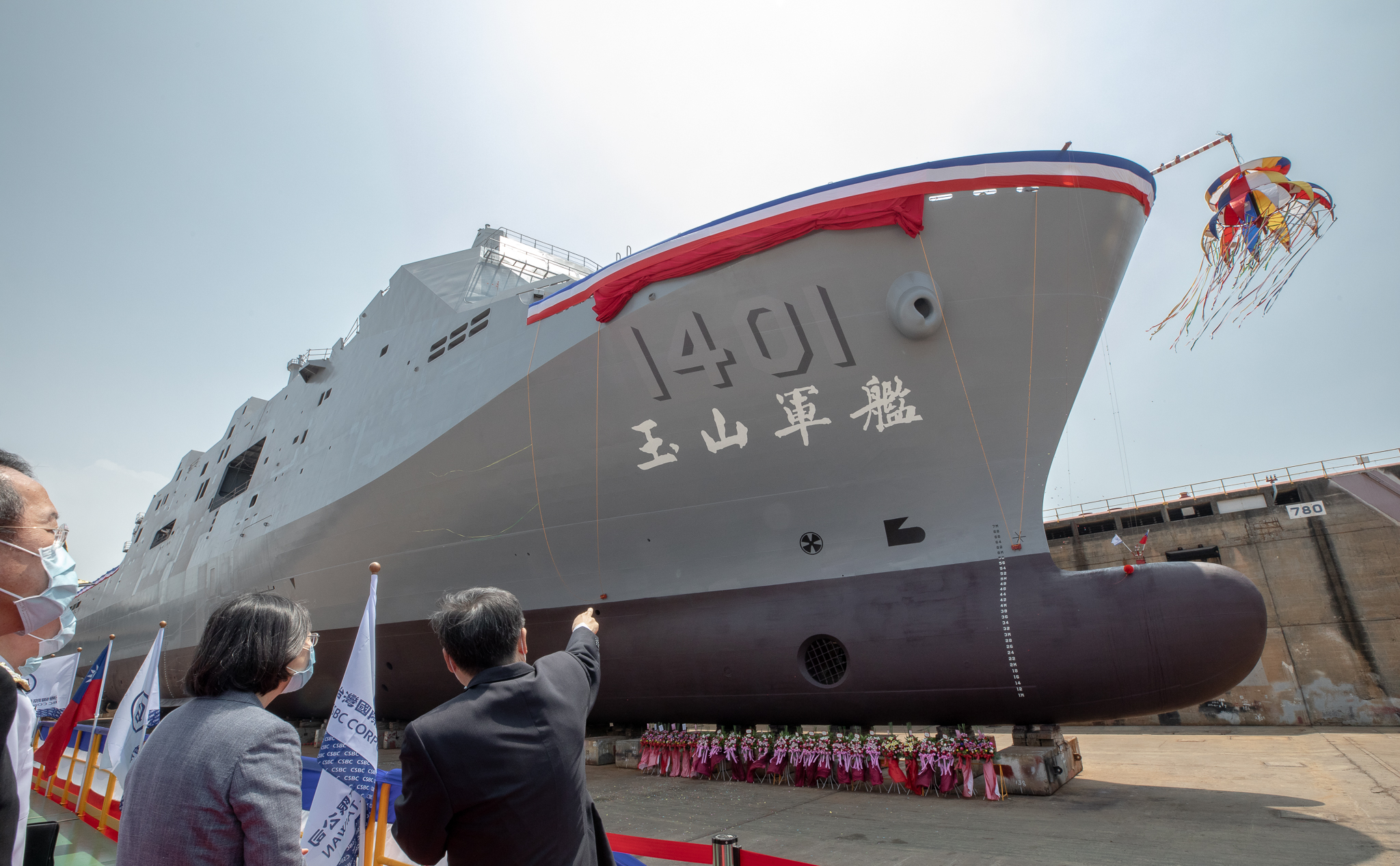
ROCS Yushan during her launching ceremony

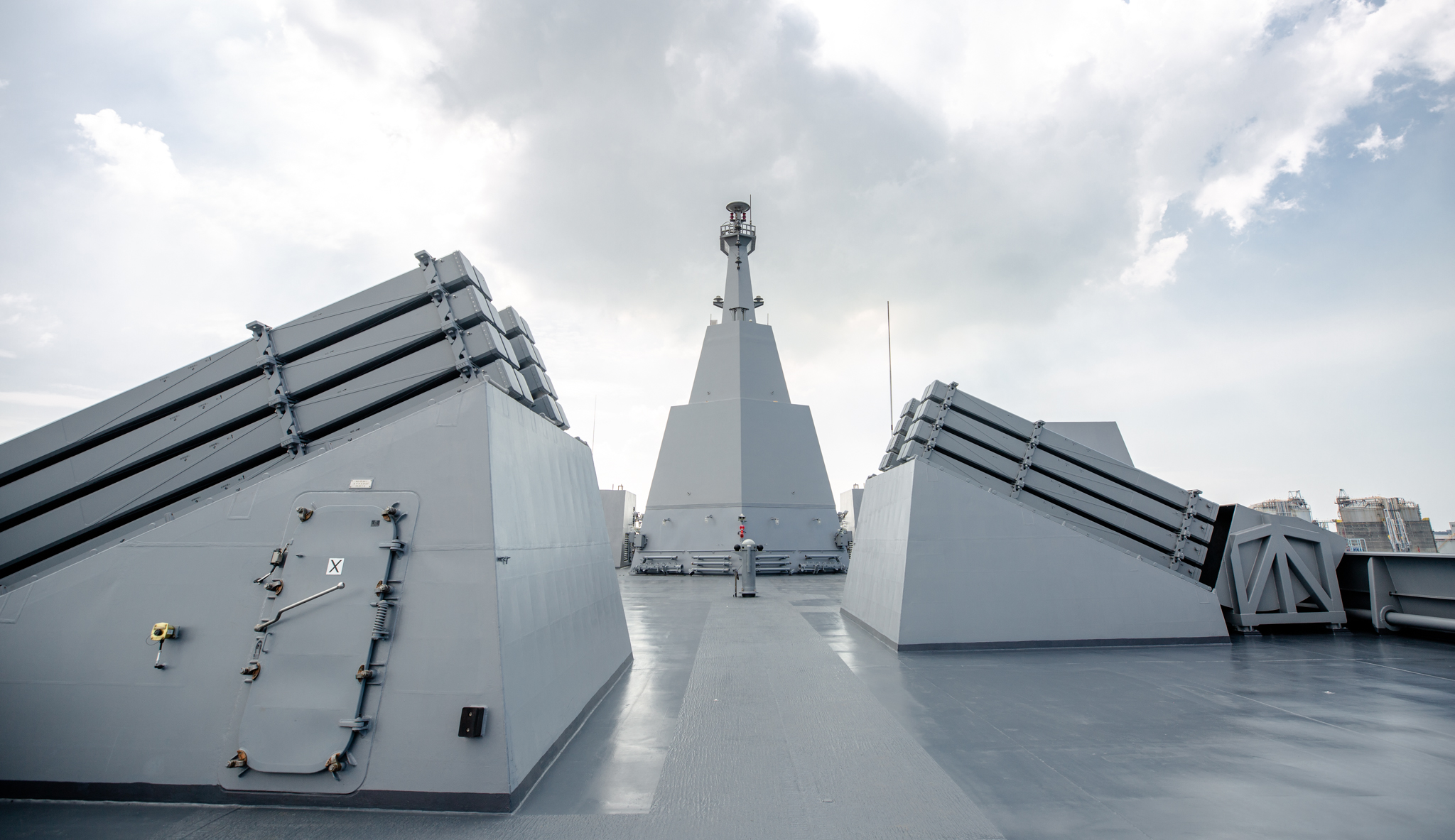
Sky Sword 2 air defense missiles

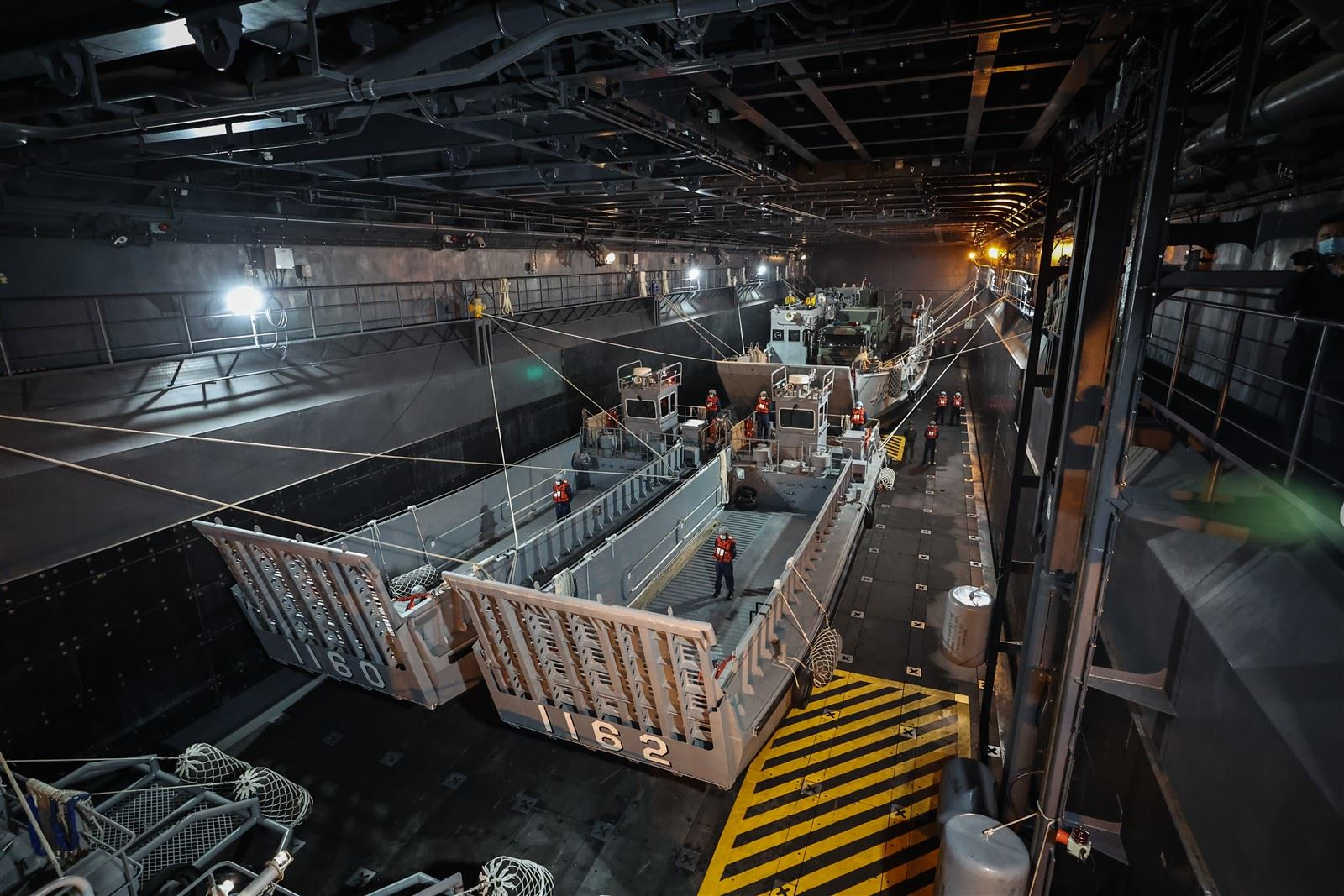
Well deck of Yushan

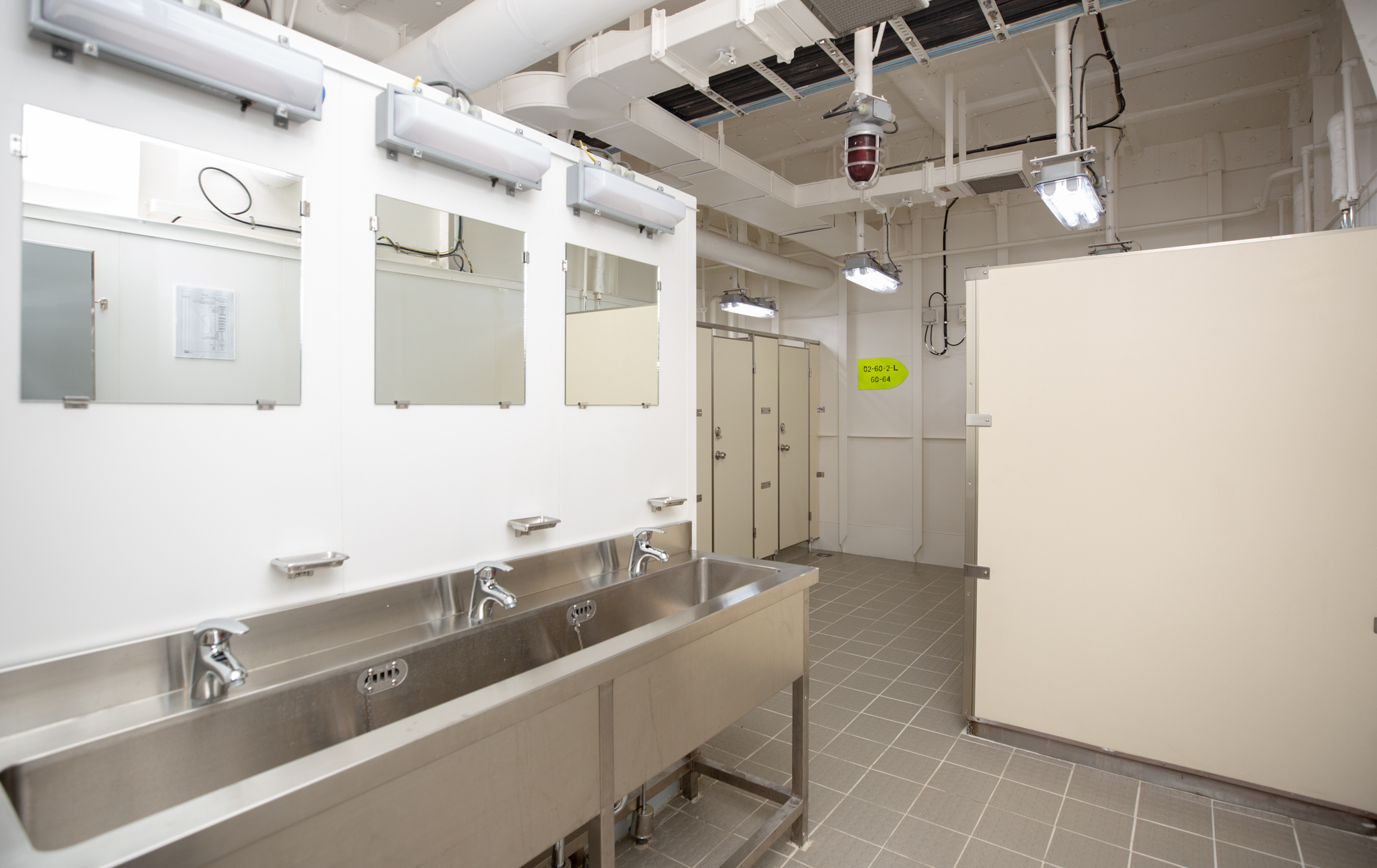
Heads on Yushan

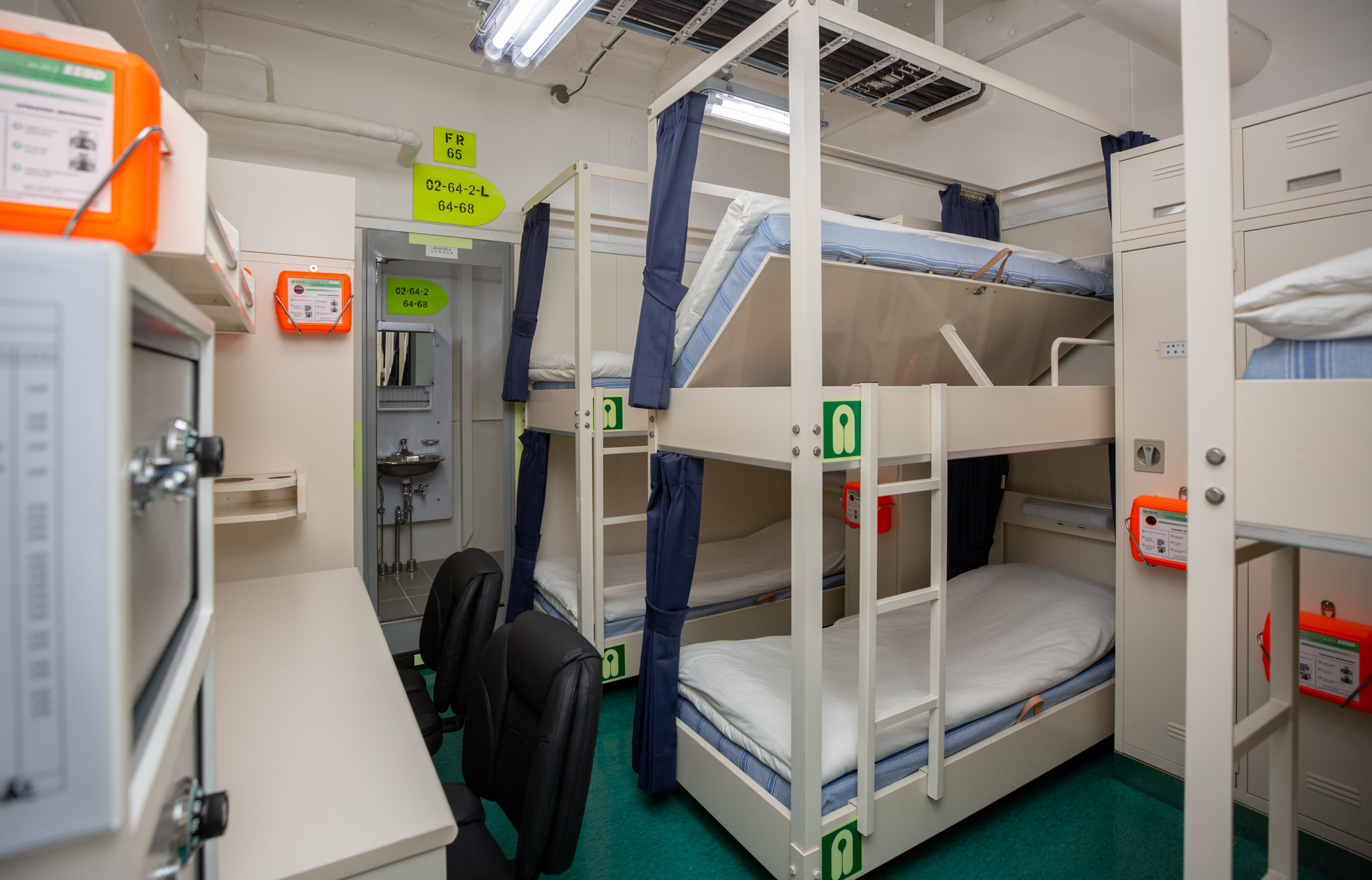
Bunks on Yushan

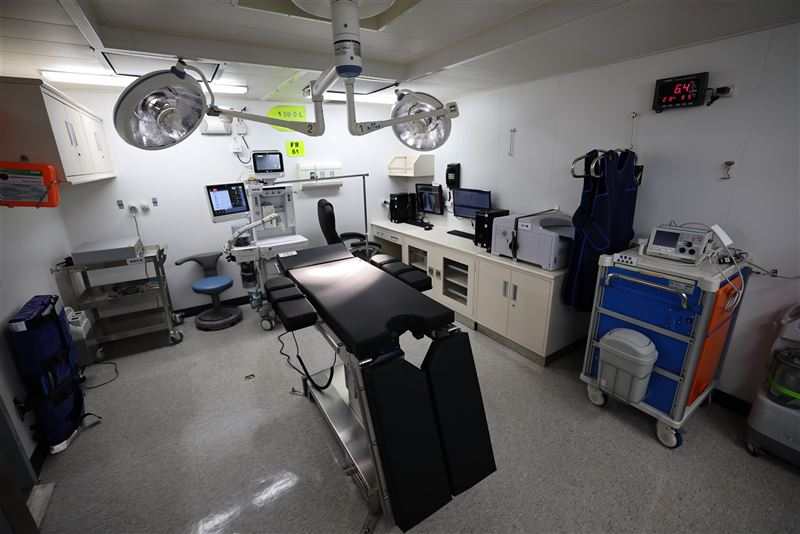
Operating theater on Yushan

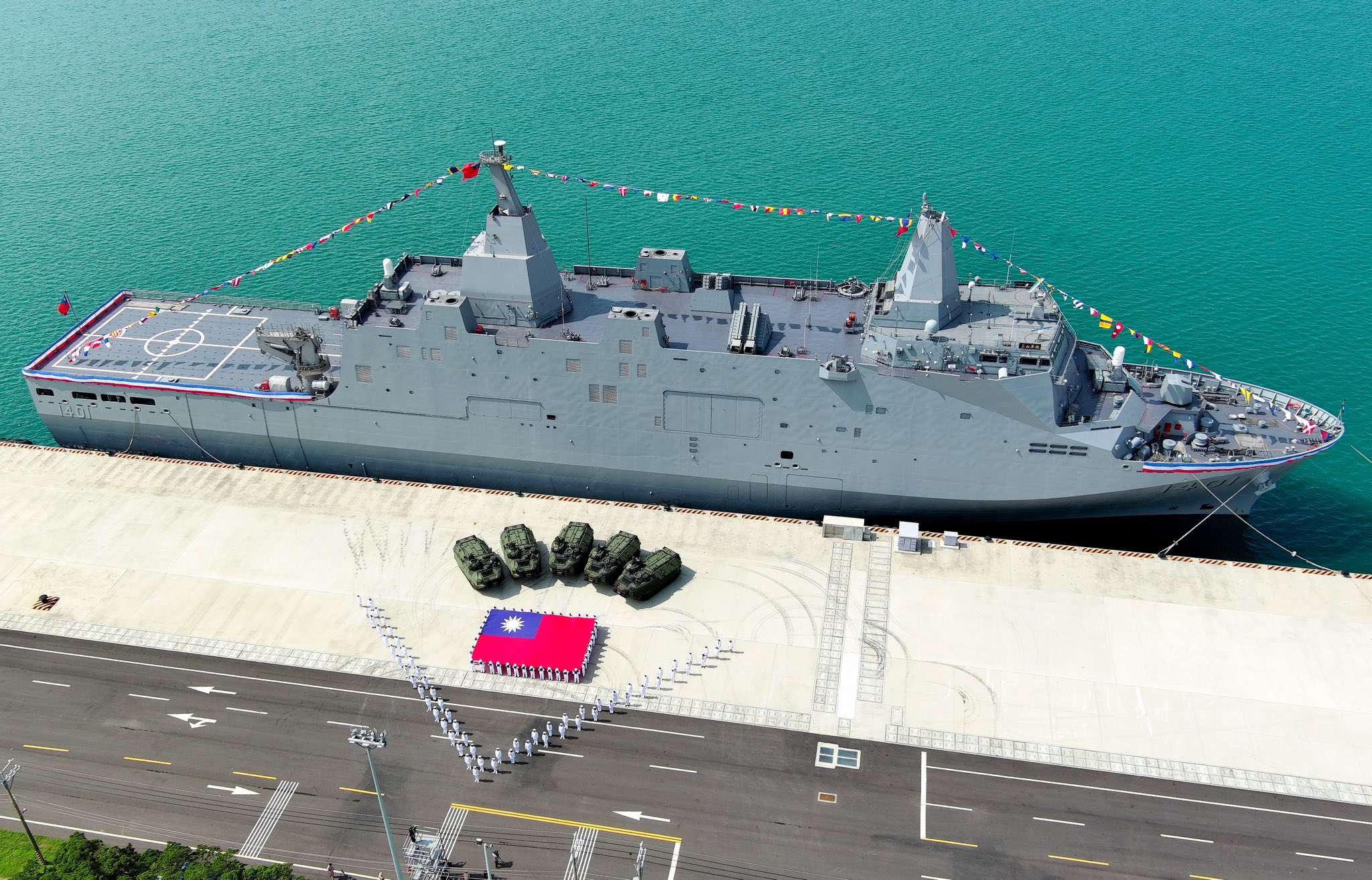
ROCS Yushan in Double Tenth Day celebration event rehearsal, 8 October 2023

== See also ==
- Panshih-class fast combat support ship
