= Tuo Chiang-class corvette =

Taiwanese class of war vessel

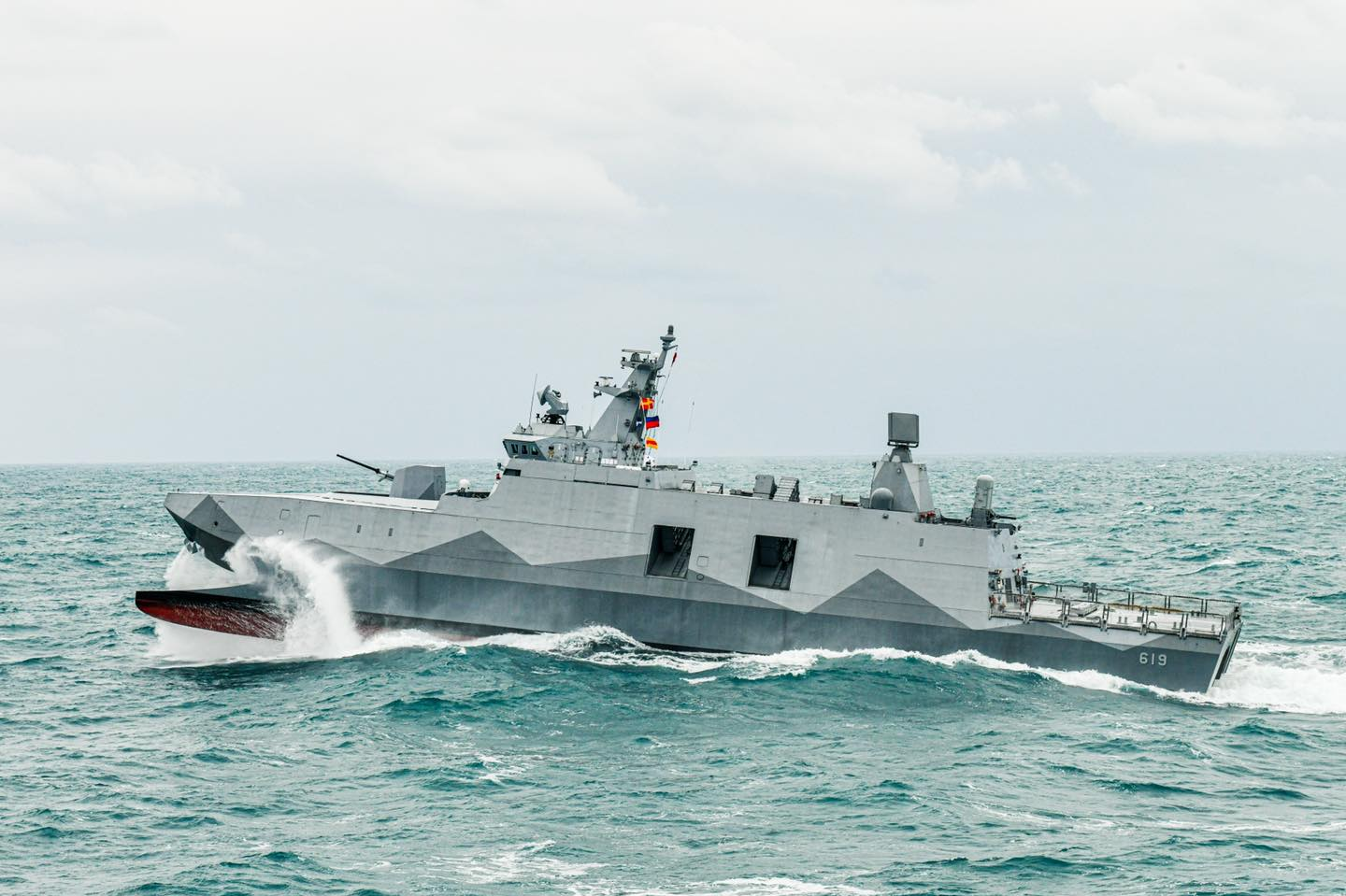

Class overview
- Name: Tuo Chiang
- Builders: Lungteh Shipbuilding, Su-Ao, Yilan County, Taiwan
- Operators: (Taiwan) Republic of China Navy
- Preceded by: Ching Chiang-class patrol ship
- Subclasses: Anping-class offshore patrol vessel
- Cost: NT$5.4 billion (US$188 million)
- Built: 2012–present
- In commission: 2014–present
- Planned: 12
- Completed: 12
- Active: 10

General characteristics
- Type: Coastal corvette
- Displacement: 502 tonnes full load, 685 tonnes full load (improved hull)
- Length: 60.4 m (198 ft 2 in) (Length on cushion), 65 m (213 ft 3 in) (improved hull)
- Beam: 14 m (45 ft 11 in), 14.8 m (48 ft 7 in) (improved hull)
- Draught: 2.3 m (7 ft 7 in), 2.1 m (6 ft 11 in) (improved hull)
- Propulsion: 2 × MTU 20V 4000 M93L diesel engine – rated at 4,300 kW (5,800 hp), 4 × MJP CSU 850 waterjet; 4 × MTU20V4000M93Ldiesel engine, 4 × MJP CSU 850 waterjet (improved hull)
- Speed: 45 kn (83 km/h; 52 mph) (fully armed)
- Complement: 41
- Sensors & processing systems: Navigational radar; CS/SPG-6N(S) surface search radar (Tuo Chiang); CS/SPG-6N(T) fire control radar (Tuo Chiang); CS/MPQ-90 Sea Bee Eye surface search and fire control AESA type radar (Ta Chiang onwards); STIR 1.2 EO Mk2 fire control radar (PGG-619~PGG-626); Leonardo S.p.A. NA-30S MK2 fire control radar (PGG-627~PGG-632); Variable depth sonar (Tuo Chiang)
- Electronic warfare & decoys: 12 counter-IR/RF chaff dispensers (6 bow and stern)
- Armament: Tuo Chiang(Flight 0); 8 × Hsiung Feng II; 8 × Hsiung Feng III; 1 × Otobreda 76 mm gun; 1 × Phalanx CIWS; 2 × 12.7 mm Browning M2HB; 2 × Mark 32 triple torpedo launcher (one port and one starboard); Flight I onwards; 16 × TC-2N; 8 × Hsiung Feng II; 4 × Hsiung Feng III; 1 × Otobreda 76 mm gun; 1 × Phalanx CIWS; 2 × 12.7 mm Browning M2HB; Flight II onwards; 16 × TC-2N; 4 × Hsiung Feng II; 8 × Hsiung Feng III; 1 × Otobreda 76 mm gun; 1 × Phalanx CIWS / 1 x Sea Oryx; 2 × 12.7 mm Browning M2HB
- Aviation facilities: Flight deck, primarily for VERTREP

The Tuo Chiang-class corvette (Chinese: 沱江; lit. 'Tuo River') is a Taiwanese-designed class of fast (up to 45 knots, 83 km/h, 52 mph) and stealthy multi-mission corvettes built for the Republic of China Navy. It is designed to counter the numerous and increasingly sophisticated People's Liberation Army Navy ships by utilizing hit-and-run tactics, and thus features clean upper structure design with very few extrusions to reduce radar signature, pre-cooled engine exhaust to reduce infrared signature, and a reduced visual signature to minimize chance of detection. Tuo Chiang was delivered to the Republic of China Navy on 23 December 2014 and formally entered operational service with the 131st Fleet on 31 March 2015.

== Development ==
The program was announced by the Ministry of National Defense (Republic of China) (MND) on 12 April 2010. It was developed by the Naval Shipbuilding Center in Kaohsiung. The Tuo Chiang class was developed to address common weakness of traditional small warships such as patrol craft and corvettes not fit for extended periods of time in rough seas around Taiwan Island.

In 2011, the Legislative Yuan approved a NT$24.98 billion (US$853.4 million) budget to fund the construction of up to 12 ships. On 18 April 2011 a top military officer and a lawmaker announced that the construction of a 500-ton prototype would begin in 2012. In the Taipei Aerospace and Defense Technology Exhibition in 2013, the Navy unveiled a model of the Hsun Hai project corvette. The prototype of the Hsun Hai program was named and christened on Friday, 14 March 2014 as ROCS Tuo Chiang (PGG-618) in honor of the gunboat in the September 2 Sea Battle during the Second Taiwan Strait Crisis.

The Ministry of National Defense prepared a budget of more than NT$16.395 billion in order to secure the follow-up mass production of three Tuojiang ships from 2017 to 2025. The mass production cost of the Tuojiang ship is 3.2 billion higher than that of the first prototype ship already in service, after deducting the hull. The Navy said that the prototype ship did not take into account the cost of missiles, and the mass-produced type was mainly used for combat readiness. The anti-aircraft missile is the standard configuration of the ship.

In early 2016, the ROC Navy began plans for procuring three air defense frigates. It has been speculated that these frigates would possibly be catamarans based on the Tuo River-class hull. Expected weapon systems include the naval variant of the Sky Bow III and the Sky Sword II firing from angled box launchers, as well as the Sea Oryx CIWS system. It will field a ballistic missile defense version of the Sky Bow III missile defense system to shoot down incoming enemy ballistic missiles.

In 2019 work commenced on the first of twelve 600+ ton coastal patrol vessels for the Coast Guard Administration, the Anping-class offshore patrol vessel, based on the Tuo Chiang-class corvette at the Jong Shyn Shipbuilding Company's Kaohsiung shipyard.

In 2021 Ta Chiang completed the testing and evaluation of the TC-2N missile.

== Design ==
The ship is a wave-piercing catamaran design which is 60.4 metres (198 ft) long, 14 metres (46 ft) wide and carries a crew of 41. It is capable of a top speed of 40 knots and a range of 2,000 nautical miles (3,700 km; 2,300 mi). It is armed with eight subsonic Hsiung Feng II and eight supersonic Hsiung Feng III anti-ship missiles launchers, a Phalanx Close-In Weapons System, and a 76 mm (3 in) main gun. The ship can operate up to sea state 7 in waves up to 20–30 ft (6.1–9.1 m) high. Taiwan Security Analysis Center (TAISAC) stated that the ship features stealth technologies to minimize radar detection, a combat system that includes a distributed-architecture combat direction system known as "Hsun Lien Project" developed by the National Chung-Shan Institute of Science and Technology and an indigenous search/track and fire-control radar and electro-optical director.

The ship increases its survivability in naval warfare by utilizing advanced stealth technology and low radar cross section (RCS), which makes it less detectable by radar and allows it to be obscured by background radar noise when operating closer to the coastline.

== Production ==
In December 2020 the first of the improved Tuo Chiang-class corvettes, PGG-619 Ta Chiang, was launched in Yilan. 6 improved models are to be delivered by 2023. According to Janes the new models feature improvements in "weaponry, mission systems, and design." Ta Chiang has been positively received by military analysts.

Lungteh launched the third Tuo Chiang-class corvette in February 2023.

The fifth vessel, An Chiang (安江), was launched in October 2023. The An Chiang is named after Yilan's Annong River (安農溪).

In March 2024, the final two corvettes from the initial batch of six ships ordered from Lungteh Shipbuilding, PPG-625 An Chiang and PPG 626 Wan Chiang, were commissioned at Su'ao Harbor in Yilan.

Production of the second batch began in 2024 with production expected to be completed by the end of 2026. Five ships are planned in the second batch. The first ship from the second batch, Dan Chiang (丹江, PGG-627), was launched in July 2025. Ships in the second batch are equipped with a Leonardo NA-30S Mk2 fire-control radar in place of the STIR 1.2 EO Mk2.

== Ships of class ==
Hull number	Name	Builder	Launched	Commissioned	Status	Note
Flight 0
PGG-618	Tuo Chiang (沱江艦)	Lung Teh Shipyard, Su-Ao	14 March 2014	23 December 2014	Active	Class prototype
Flight I
PGG-619	Ta Chiang (塔江艦)	Lung Teh Shipyard, Su-Ao	15 December 2020	27 July 2021	Active	Improved hull of first ship
PGG-620	Fu Chiang (富江艦)	Lung Teh Shipyard, Su-Ao	21 September 2022	28 June 2023	Active
PGG-621	Hsu Chiang (旭江艦)	Lung Teh Shipyard, Su-Ao	16 February 2023	6 February 2024	Active
PGG-623	Wu Chiang (武江艦)	Lung Teh Shipyard, Su-Ao	28 June 2023	1 March 2024	Active
PGG-625	An Chiang (安江艦)	Lung Teh Shipyard, Su-Ao	16 October 2023	26 March 2024	Active
PGG-626	Wan Chiang (萬江艦)	Lung Teh Shipyard, Su-Ao	November 2023	26 March 2024	Active
Flight II
PGG-627	Tan Chiang (丹江艦)	Lung Teh Shipyard, Su-Ao	2 July 2025	11 March 2026	Active
PGG-628	Liu Chiang (柳江艦)	Lung Teh Shipyard, Su-Ao	7 August 2025	5 May 2026
PGG-629	Wu Chiang (浯江艦)	Lung Teh Shipyard, Su-Ao	28 April 2026	30 June 2026
PGG-630	Lan Chiang (蘭江艦)	Lung Teh Shipyard, Su-Ao		16 September 2026
PGG-632	Pao Chiang (寶江艦)	Lung Teh Shipyard, Su-Ao	28 May 2026

== Gallery ==
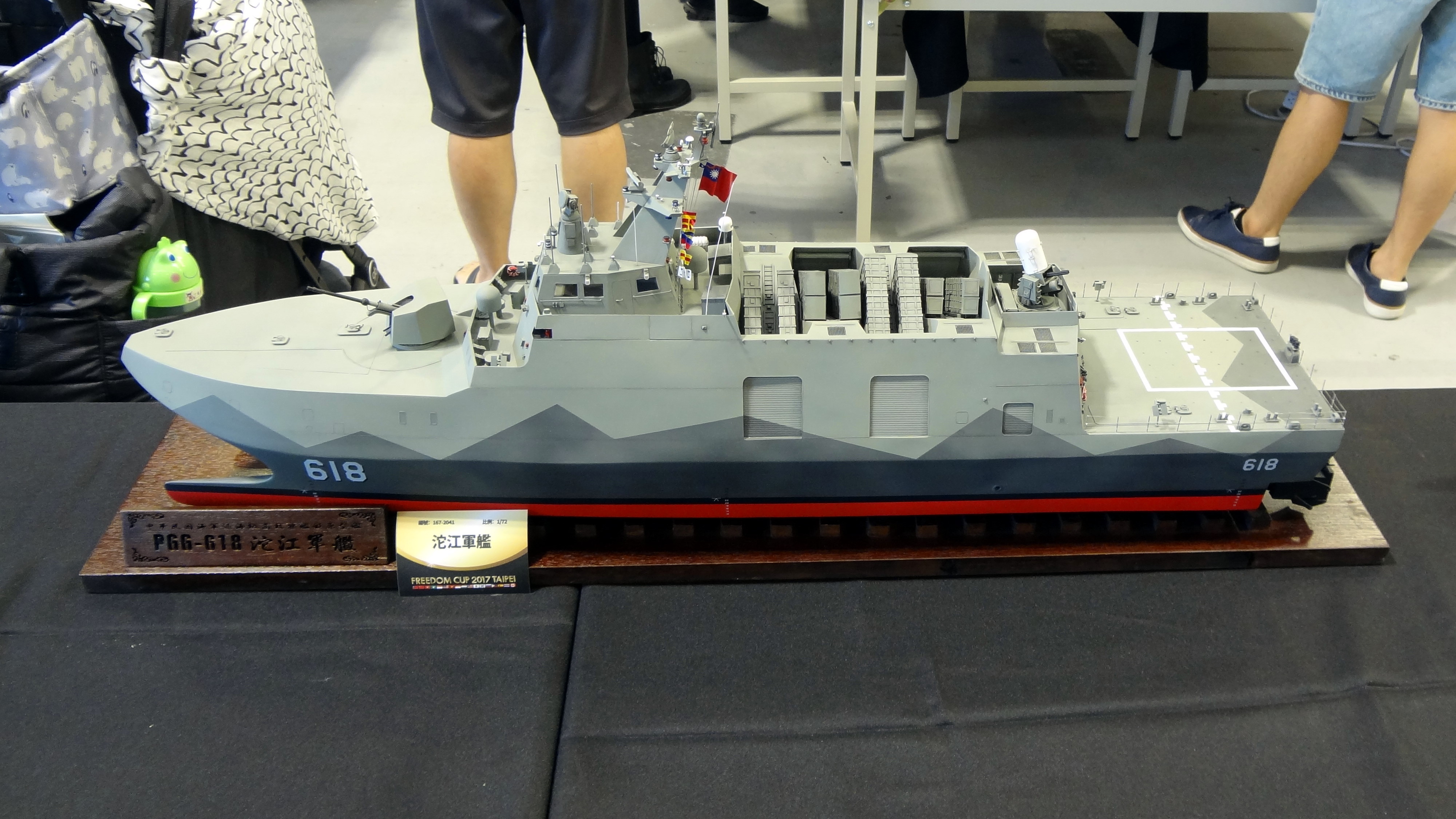
Model of PGG-618 Tuo Chiang

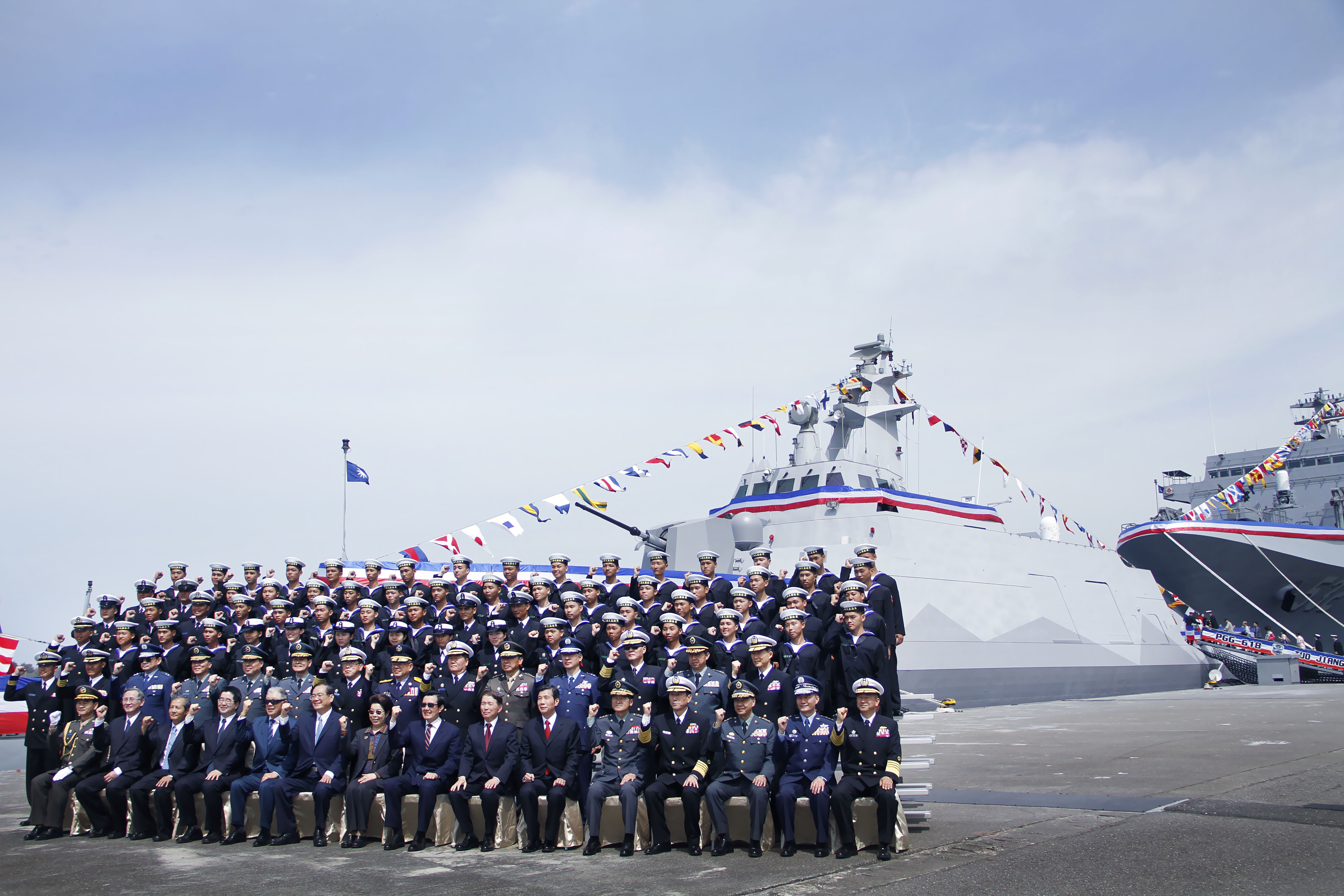
Taiwanese President Ma Ying-jeou with dignitaries, officers, and crew at Tuo Chiang's commissioning ceremony

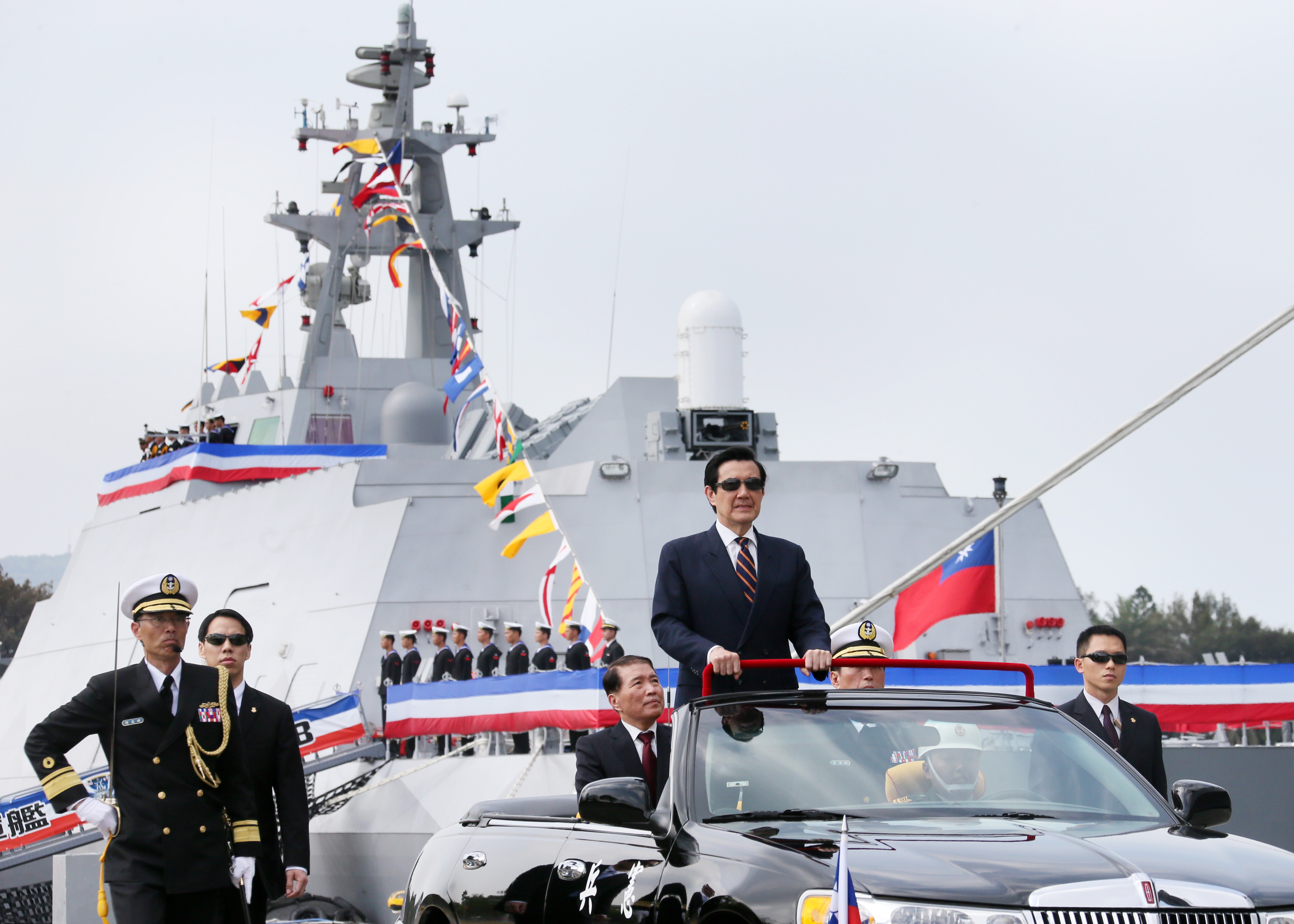
President Ma in an open top limousine at Tuo Chiang's commissioning ceremony

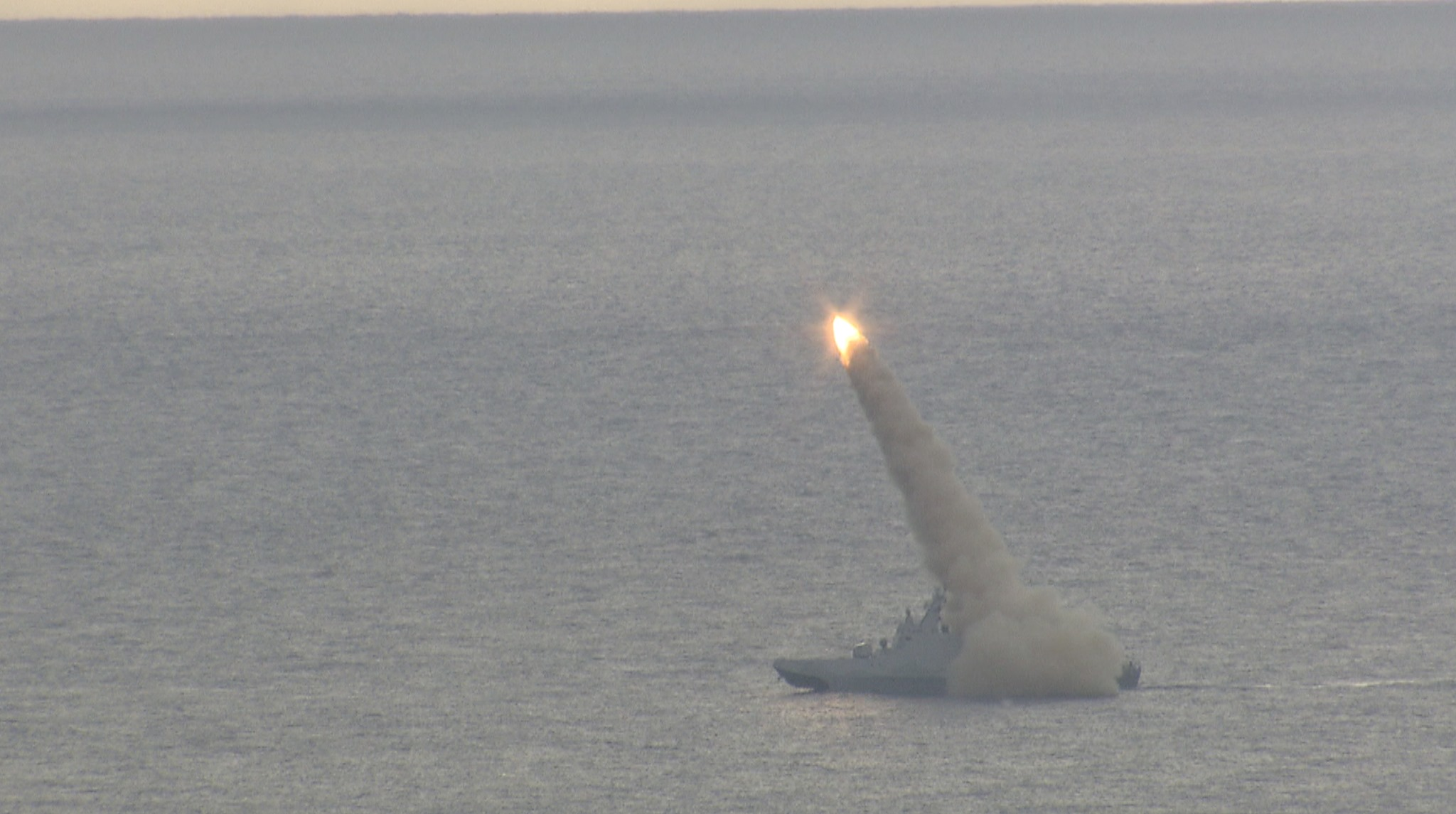
Tuo Chiang firing a HF-3

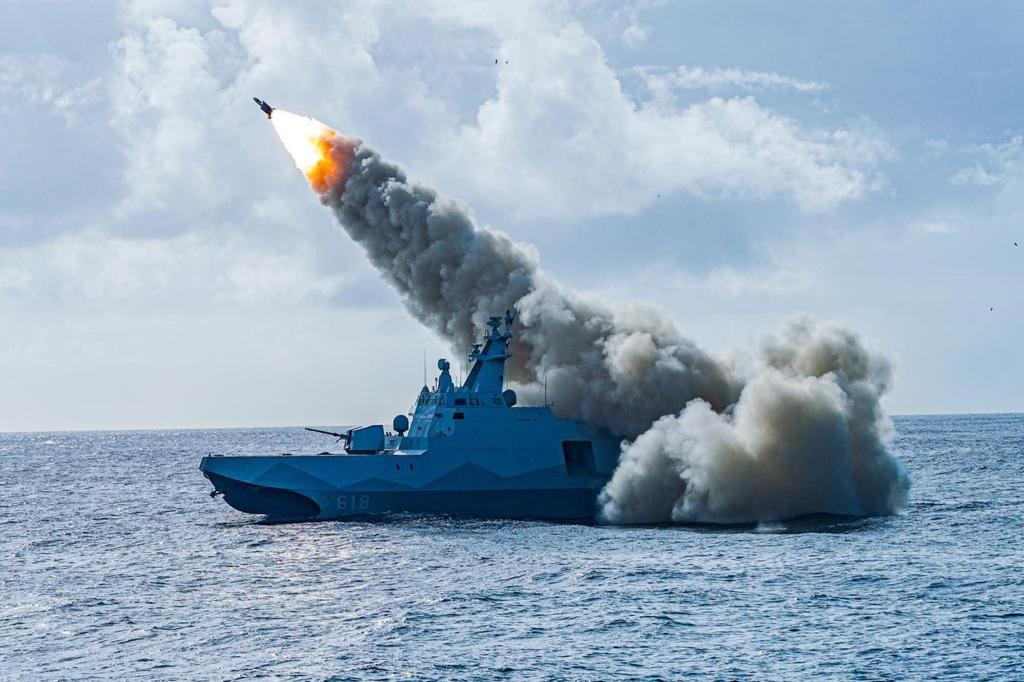
HF-3 launched by ROCN Tuo Chiang (PGG-618)

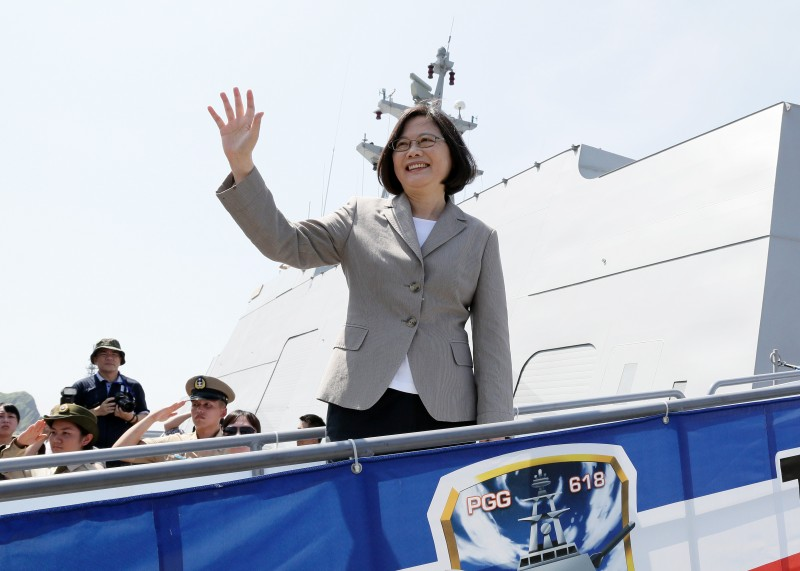
Taiwanese President Tsai Ing-wen aboard Tuo Chiang

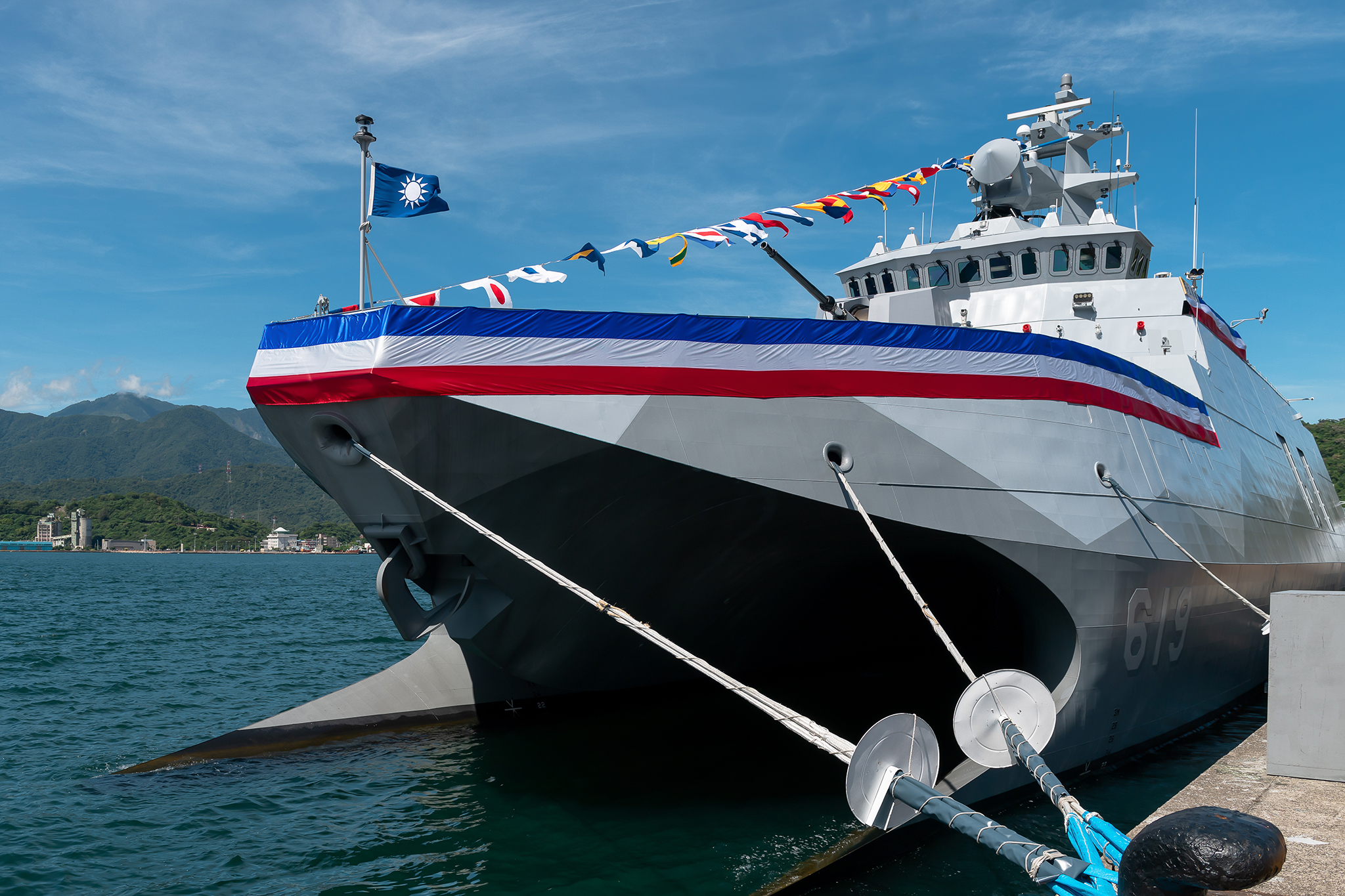
PGG-619 Ta Chiang delivery ceremony

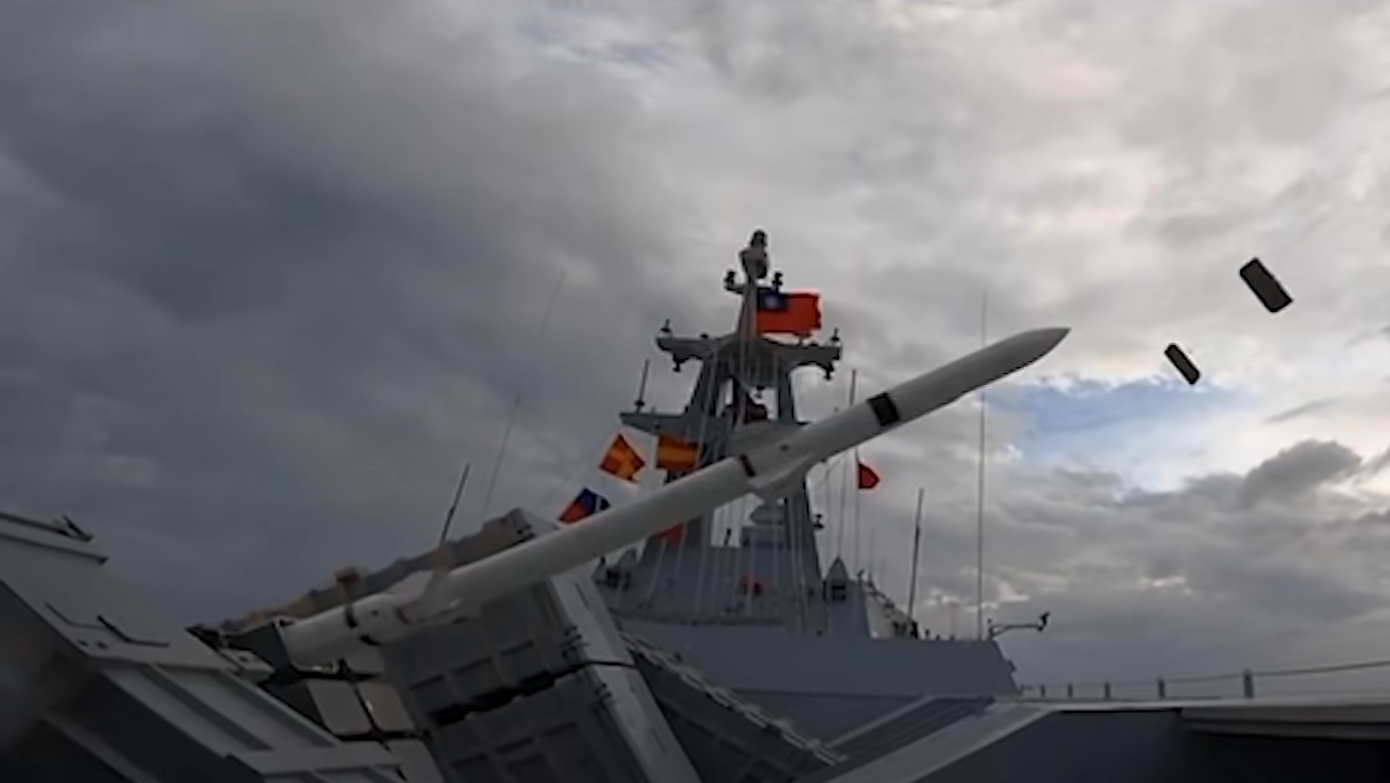
TC-2N fired from PGG-619 Ta Chiang

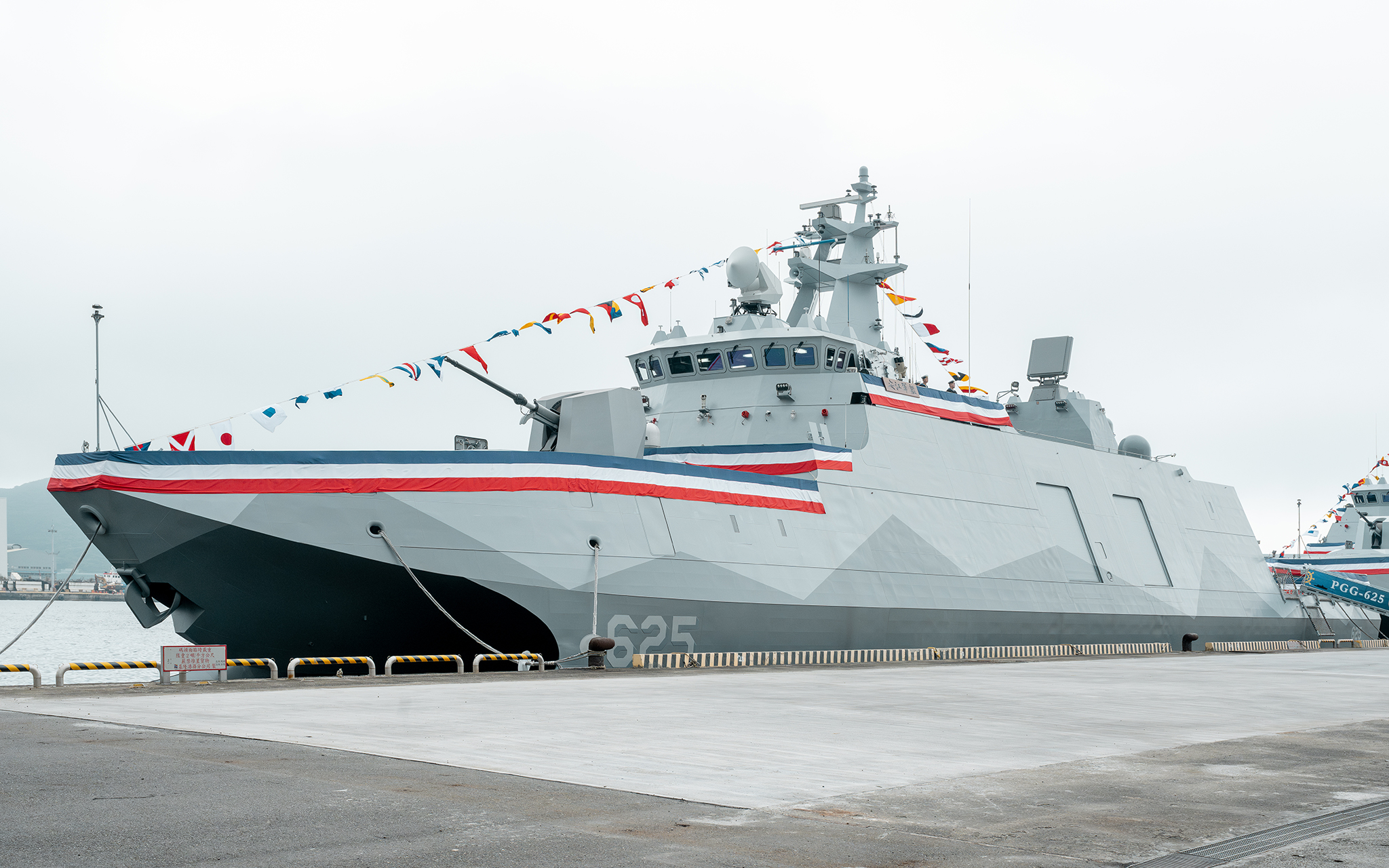
PGG-625 An Chiang

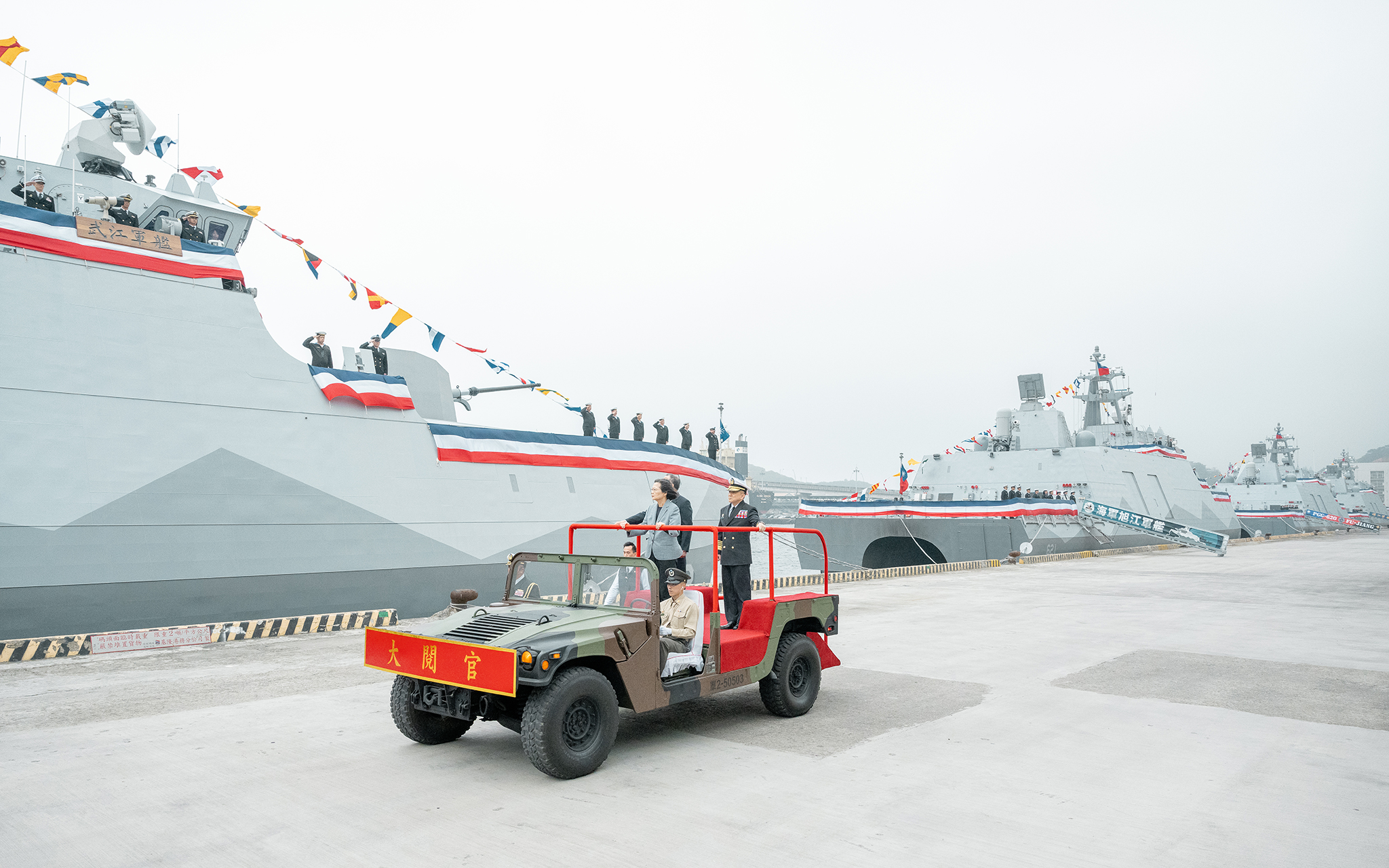
President Tsai reviewing ships of the class from an open humvee

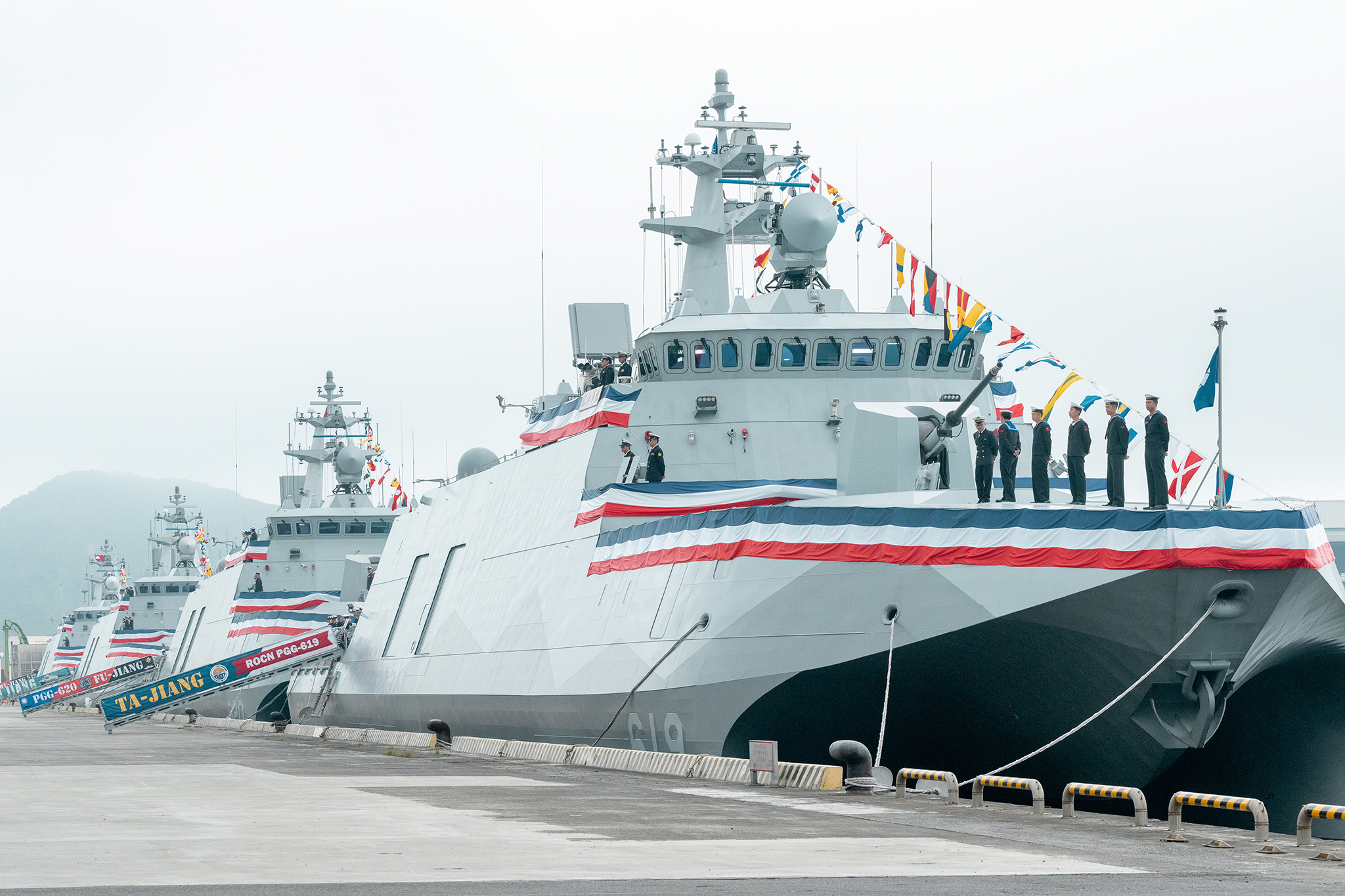
Four corvettes pierside

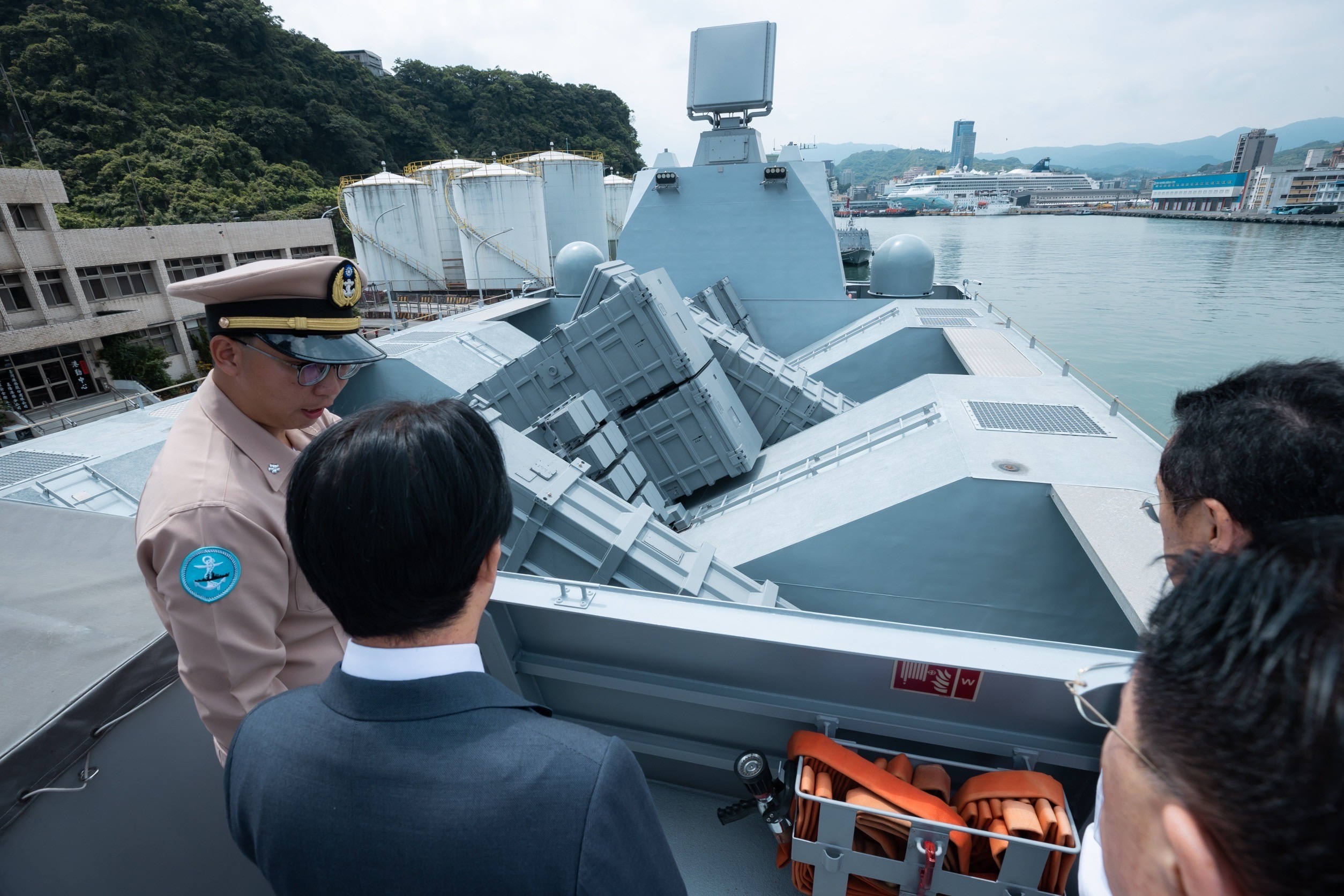
HF-2, HF-3, and TC-2N aboard PGG-621 Hsu Chiang under review by President Lai Ching-te

== See also ==
- Defense industry of Taiwan
- List of corvette classes in service

Equivalent modern corvettes

- Visby-class – (Sweden)
- Buyan-M-class – (Russia)
- Karakurt-class – (Russia)
