= Sky Sword II =

Taiwanese beyond-visual-range air-to-air missile with active radar homing

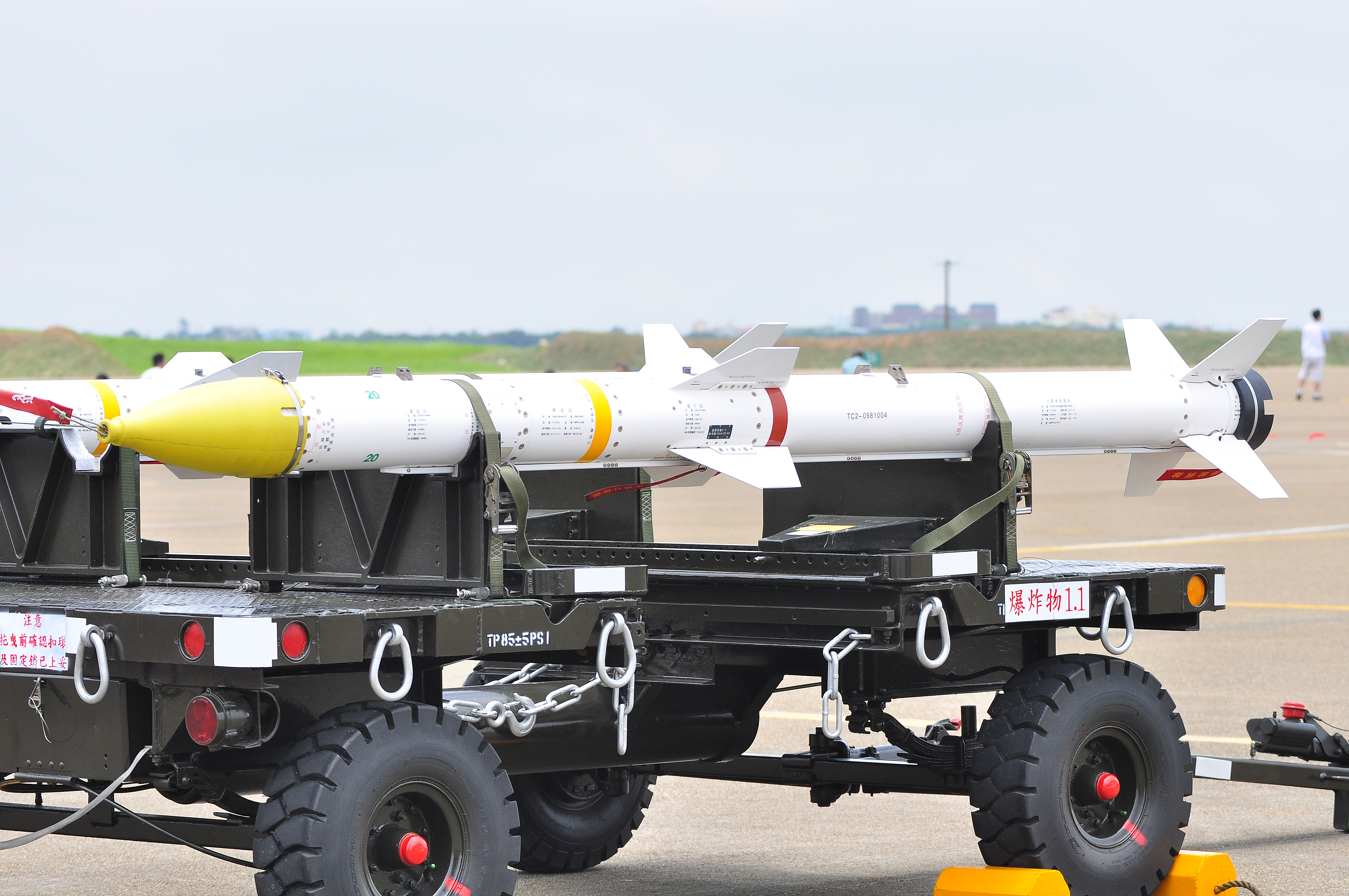
- TC-II Sky Sword 2 (air-to-air version)
- Type: Beyond-visual-range air-to-air missile
- Place of origin: Taiwan

Service history
- Used by: Republic of China Air Force; Republic of China Navy; Republic of China Army

Production history
- Designed: 1990s
- Manufacturer: National Chung-Shan Institute of Science and Technology

Specifications
- Mass: 184 kg
- Length: 3.694 m / 4.6 m (TC-2N)
- Diameter: 19 cm
- Operational range: 100 km (62 mi) (TC-2C)
- Maximum speed: Mach 6 (TC-2C)
- Guidance system: Transis guiding phase : Inertial navigation system Terminal homing phase : Active radar homing
- Launch platform: Air Force: AIDC F-CK-1 Ching-Kuo; Navy: Tuo Chiang-class corvette & Kang Ding-class; Army: Transporter erector launchers

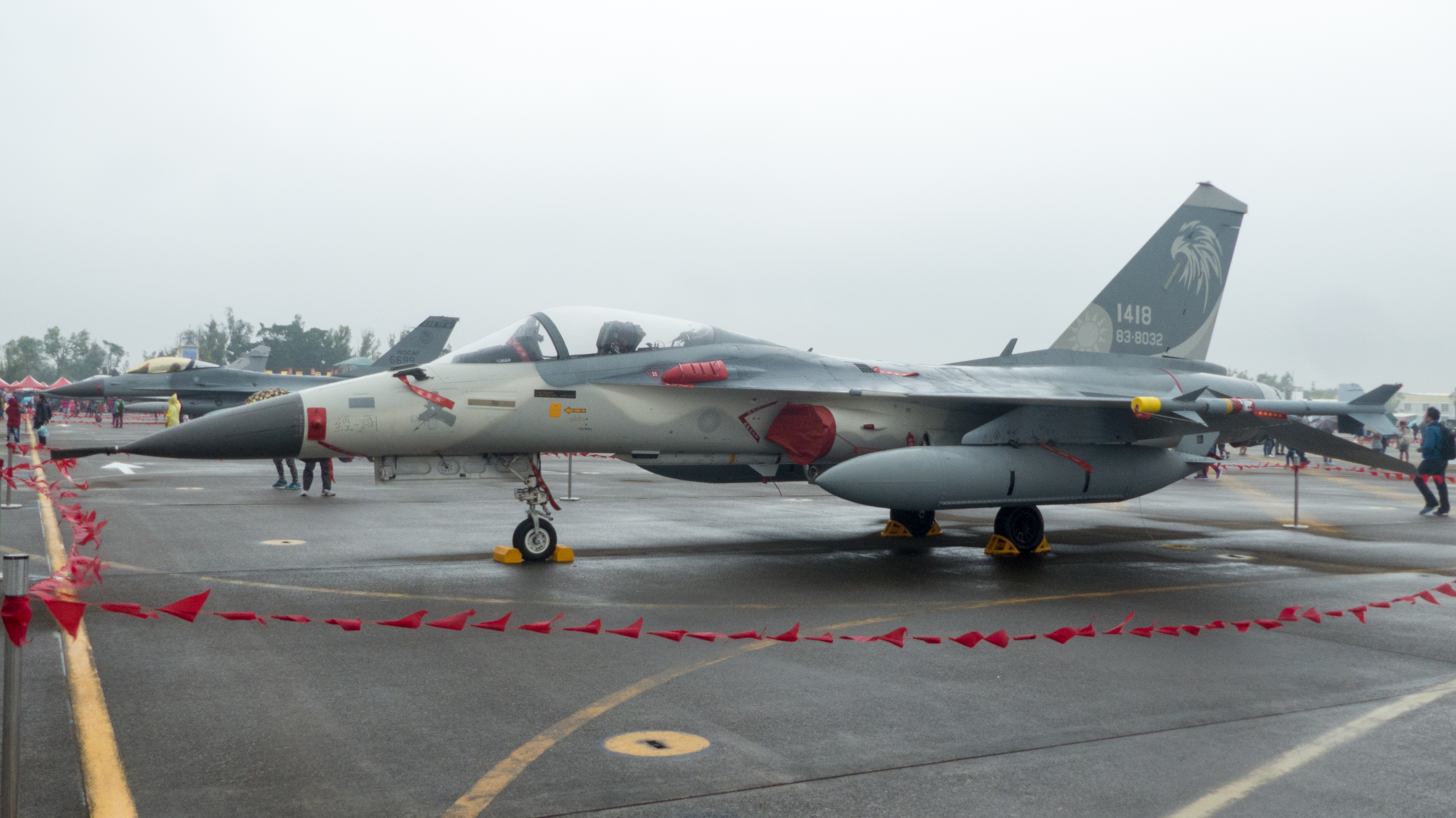
ROCAF F-CK-1A at Ching Chuan Kang Air Base with two TC-1 on the wingtips and two TC-2 underbody

ROCAF F-CK-1A underbody have two TC-2

The Sky Sword II, Tien Chien II, or TC-2 (Chinese: 天劍二; pinyin: Tiān Jiàn Èr; Wade–Giles: Tʻien^{1} Chien^{4} Êrh^{4}) is a Taiwanese beyond-visual-range air-to-air missile. It has an inertial navigation system, a data-link for mid-course guidance and active radar homing for terminal guidance, beyond visual range. It also has ECCM capability and can engage multiple targets. According to Su Tzu-yun, chief executive officer at the Center for Advanced Technology at Tamkang University, they are a cost-effective design which can perform a key role in Taiwan's defense strategy, and substantially offset China's air superiority. Some details of its design were revealed for the first time at the Paris Air Show in 2015. The pulse doppler radar seeker reportedly has a detection range of 9.3 km (5.8 mi).

== Development ==
Development of the Sky Sword II family began during the 1990s.

== Service history ==
In 2017 a Sky Sword II launched by a F-CK-1 during a training exercise failed to ignite and fell into the sea. In 2019 TC-2 was among 117 missiles fired during a training exercise off Taiwan's west coast.

== Variants ==
=== TC-2N ===
A ship-launched, surface-to-air version was later developed and designated TC-2N. Its development began in 1994, and a ground-based test was first carried out against a low-flying drone in 1997. This development was revealed to the public in 2005 and the intention to make it compatible with vertical launch methods was announced in 2006. The first ship-based launch took place in mid-2014. In the naval role the TC-2N fills an air defense gap between the Phalanx CIWS and SM-2 systems with a range of 30 km (19 mi).

The missile has all-weather capability, is equipped with a thrust-vectoring booster to increase its range as well as maneuverability during launch phase (although early ship-based launch trials were carried out without this feature), and can engage anti-ship missiles and aircraft. It also has folding control surfaces to be quad-packed into either above-deck oblique launchers or in-deck vertical launch systems.

By May 2021 the TC-2N had passed its live fire trials and operational evaluations. Final evaluation was conducted aboard the Tuo Chiang-class corvette Ta Chiang.

The Tuo Chiang-class corvettes are equipped to carry up to 16 TC-2Ns.

Yushan-class landing platform dock are equipped to carry up to 32 TC-2Ns.

=== TC-2A ===
TC-2A is an anti-radiation missile, similar to the AGM-88 HARM. The TC-2A program began soon after the completion of the TC-2. It fills the requirement of the ROCAF for an Anti-Radiation Missile to arm the F-CK-1. It is reported to be 3.6 m (11 ft 10 in) long, 19 cm (7.5 in) in diameter, weighs 184 kg (406 lb) (warhead weighs 22 kg (49 lb)), and with a range of 100 km (62 mi). The passive radar seeker on the TC-2A has been reported as having a detection range of 92 km (57 mi).

=== TC-2C ===
TC-2C is an advanced air-to-air version first tested in 2017 and intended to replace the standard TC-2. It features a number of incremental improvements including an improved rocket motor which allows an engagement range of 100 km (62 mi).

In 2021 it was announced that an extended range version of the TC-2 had been ordered by the Air Force with 250-300 ordered from NCSIST at a unit cost of NT$30 million (US$1.07 million).

=== Land Sword 2 ===
The land based version of the TC-2N, called the land sword two (陸劍二, pinyin: lù jiàn èr) features the missile packaged in a sealed container-launcher. NCSIST has exhibited a truck mounted version with four missile pods. The TC-2 air-defense system was exhibited at International Defence Exhibition in Abu Dhabi with a reported canister length of 4 m (13 ft) and an all up weight (combined canister and round) of 350 kg (770 lb). It reportedly retains the midcourse inertial guidance with data link and terminal active radar guidance schemes, as well as an electronic counter-countermeasure (ECCM) capability. Because it lacks the naval version's booster, however, its effective range is reportedly only 15 km (9.3 mi).

Six batteries with 246 missiles were ordered in 2019.

A TC-2 battery participated in the 2021 Double Ten Day parade. In 2024 a TC-2 battery participated in a live fire exercise in Pingtung, firing four missiles.

The ground launched TC-2 is also referred to as the Tien Chien III (TC-3).

=== TC-3/TC-5 ===
The Tien Chien 3 is an improved air-to-air missile under development from the TC-2. Range of 160 kilometers (99 miles). This offers similar range to the AIM-120C-8. This missile is also referred to as the TC-5. It is distinct from the ground launched TC-2.

=== Gallery ===
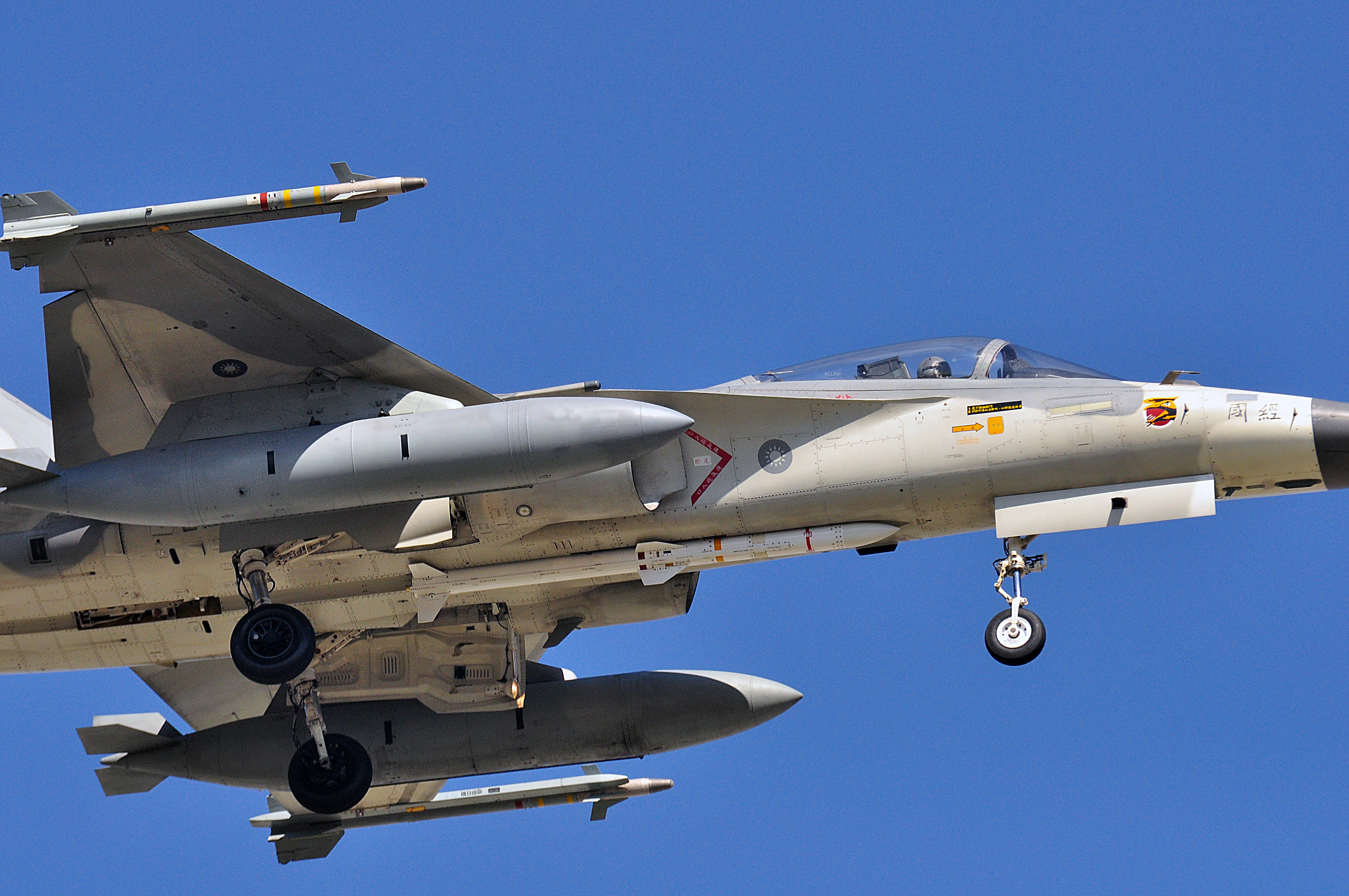
F-CK-1 with TC-1 and TC-2 missiles

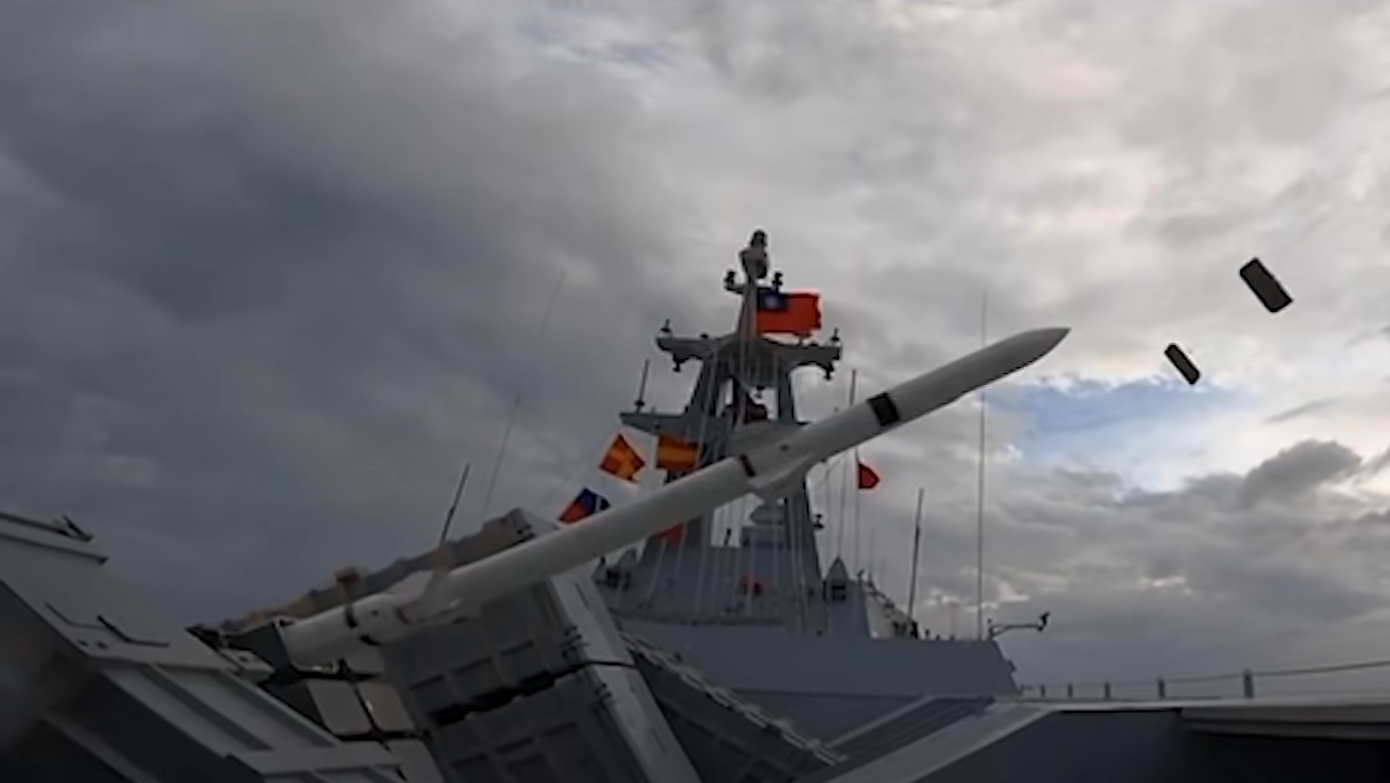
A ship-launched TC-2N

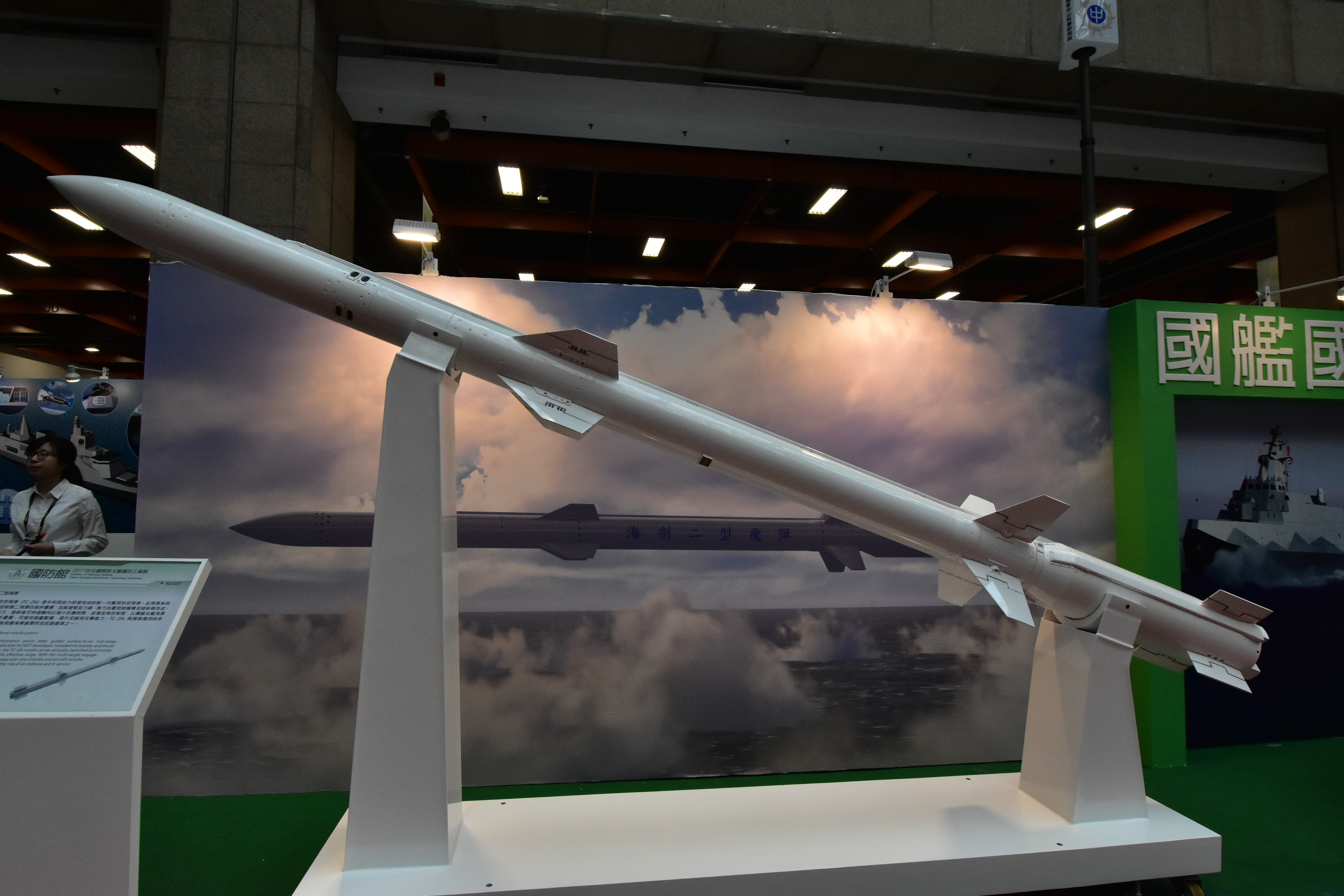
A ship-launched, Surface-to-air TC-2N model

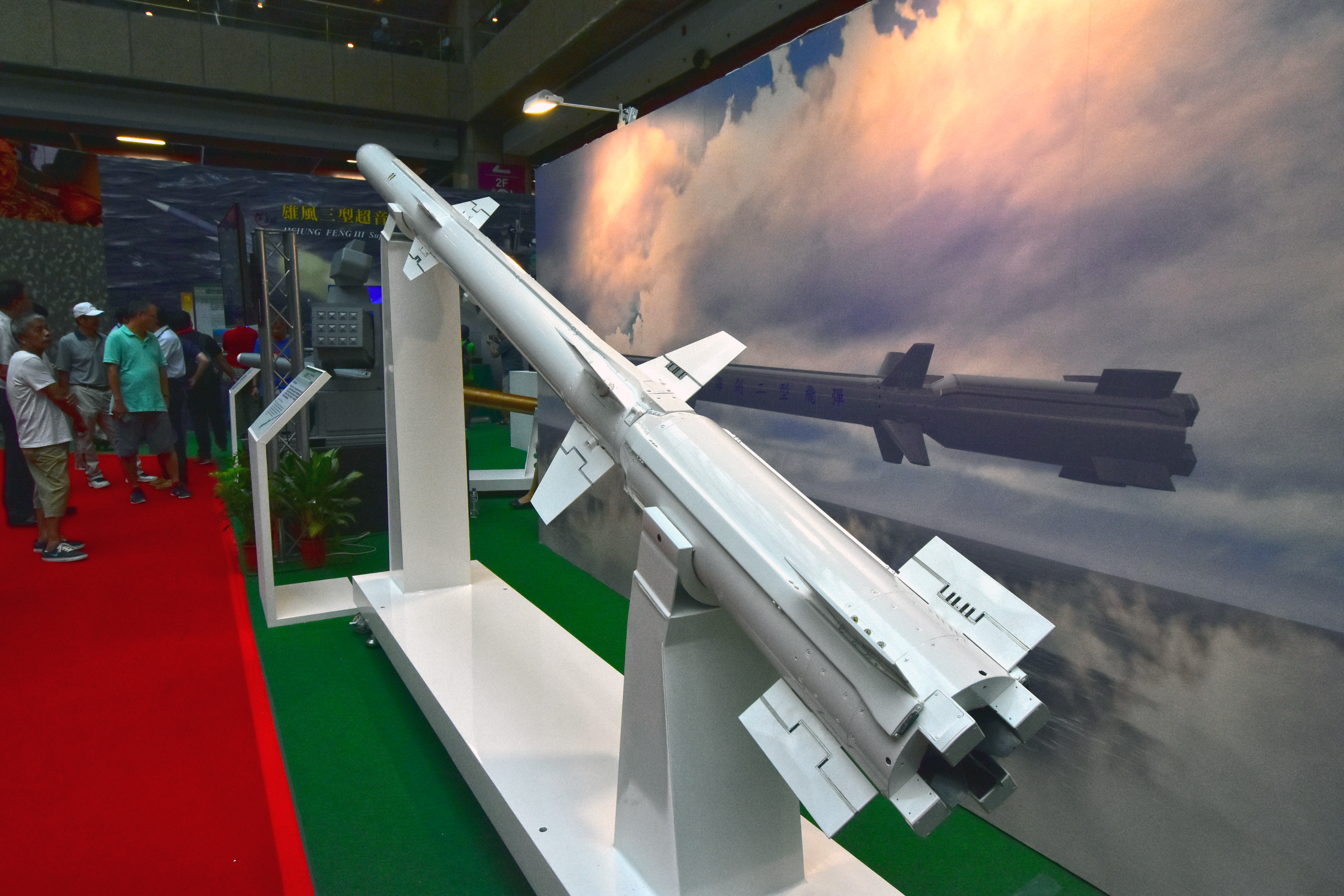
A ship-launched, Surface-to-air TC-2N model

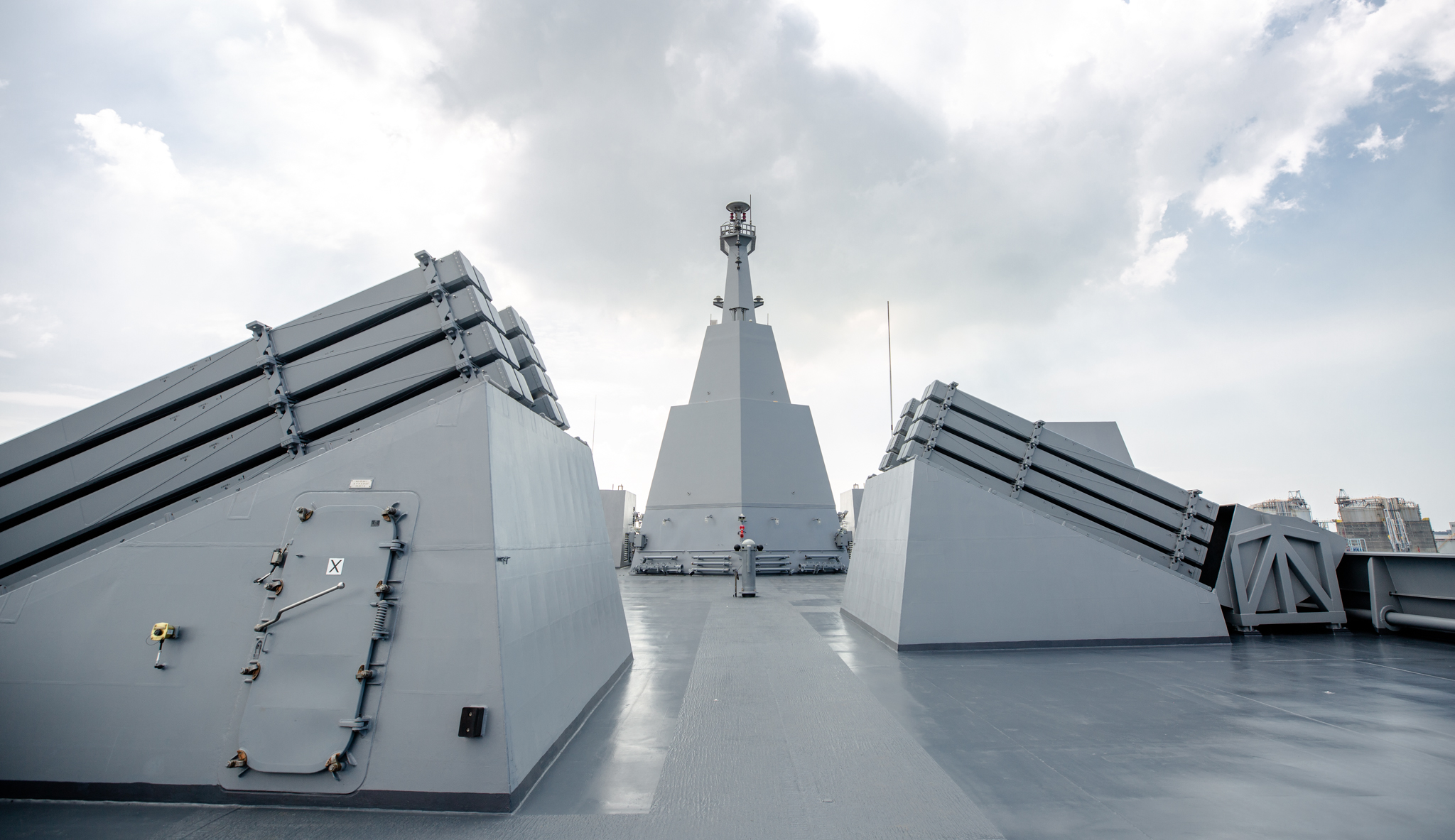
TC-2N aboard ROCS Yushan (LPD-1401)

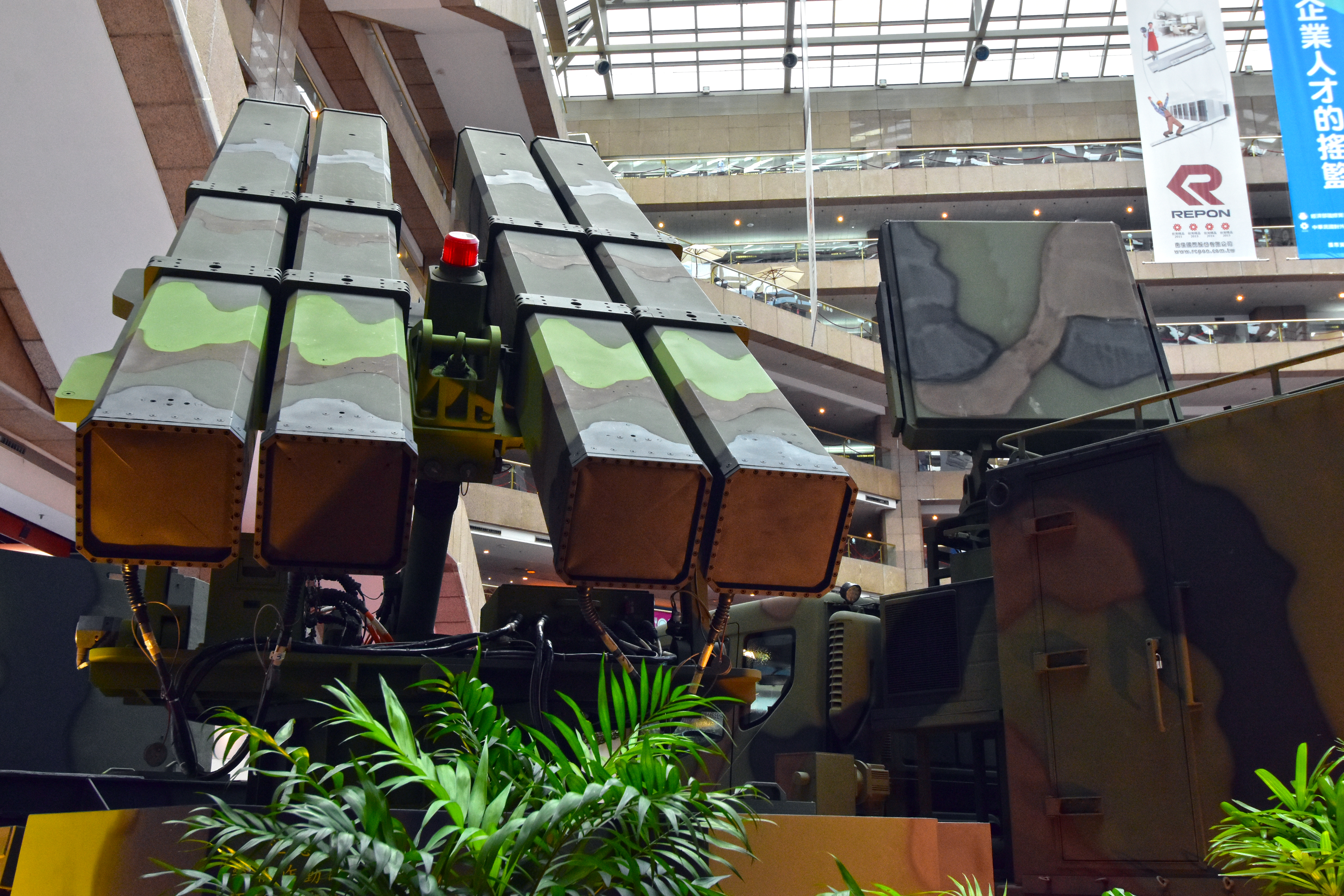
Surface-to-Air TC-2 model and CS/MPQ-90 Bee Eye radar

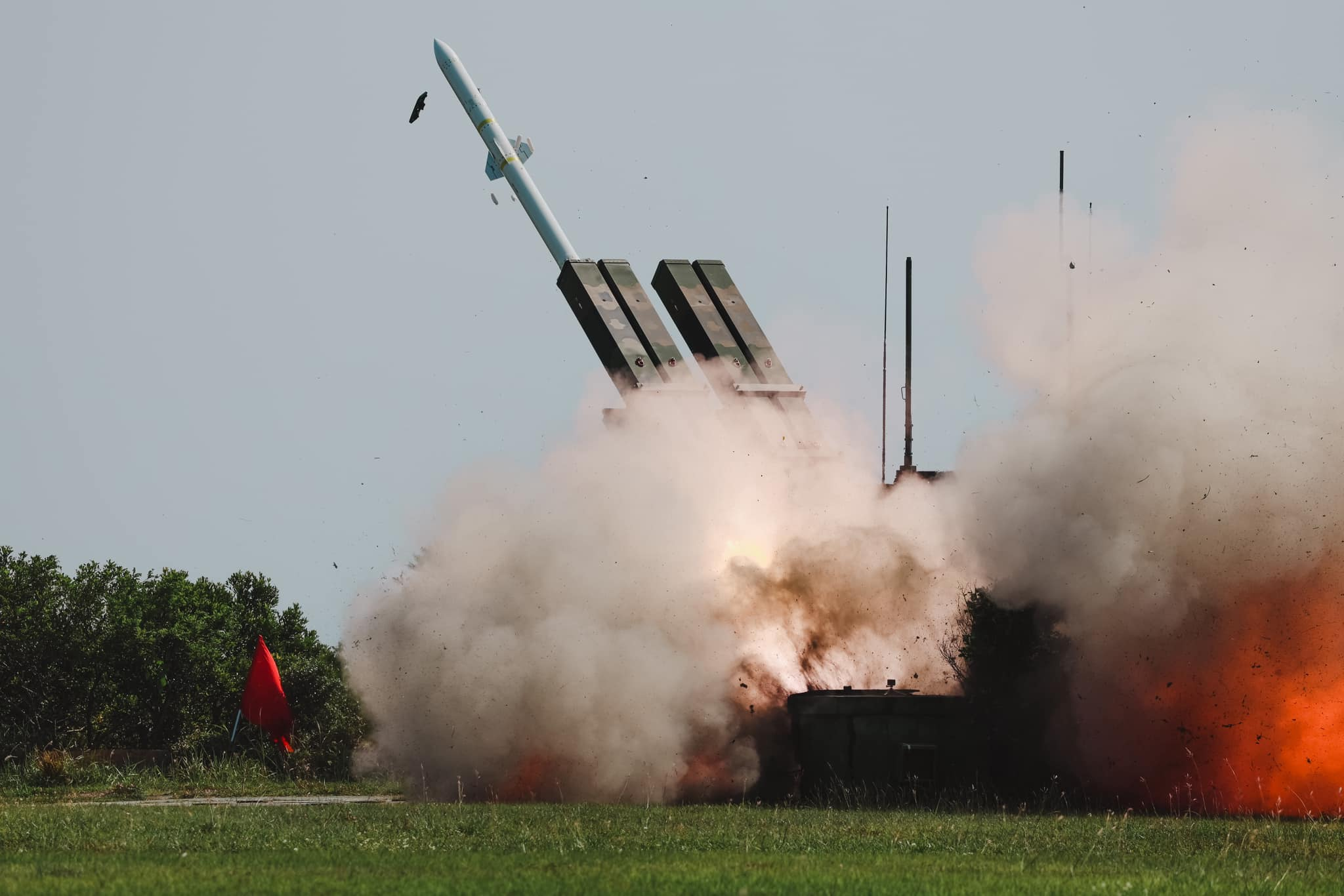
Land Sword 2 launch at Jiupeng Military Base

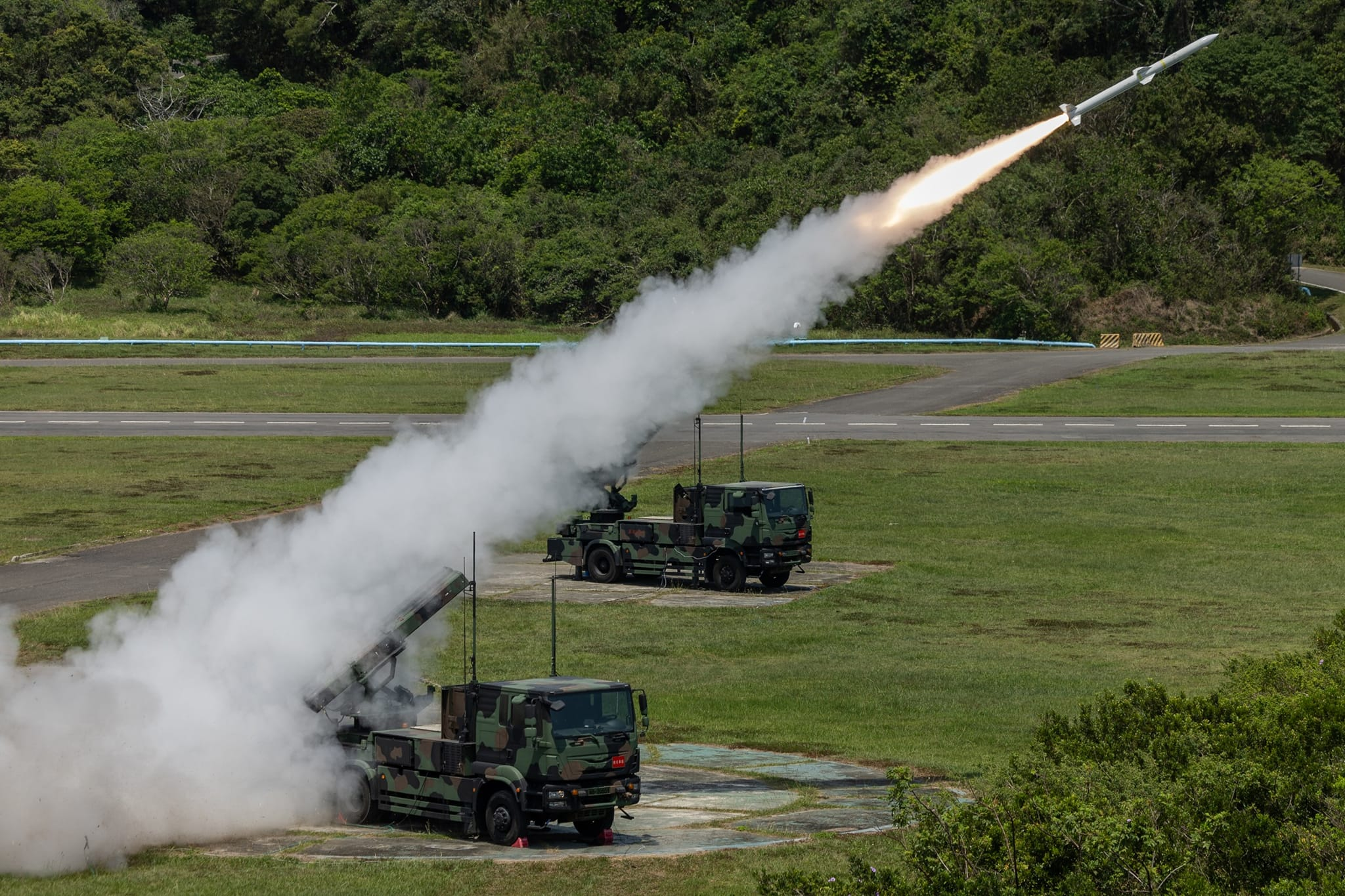
Land Sword 2 launch

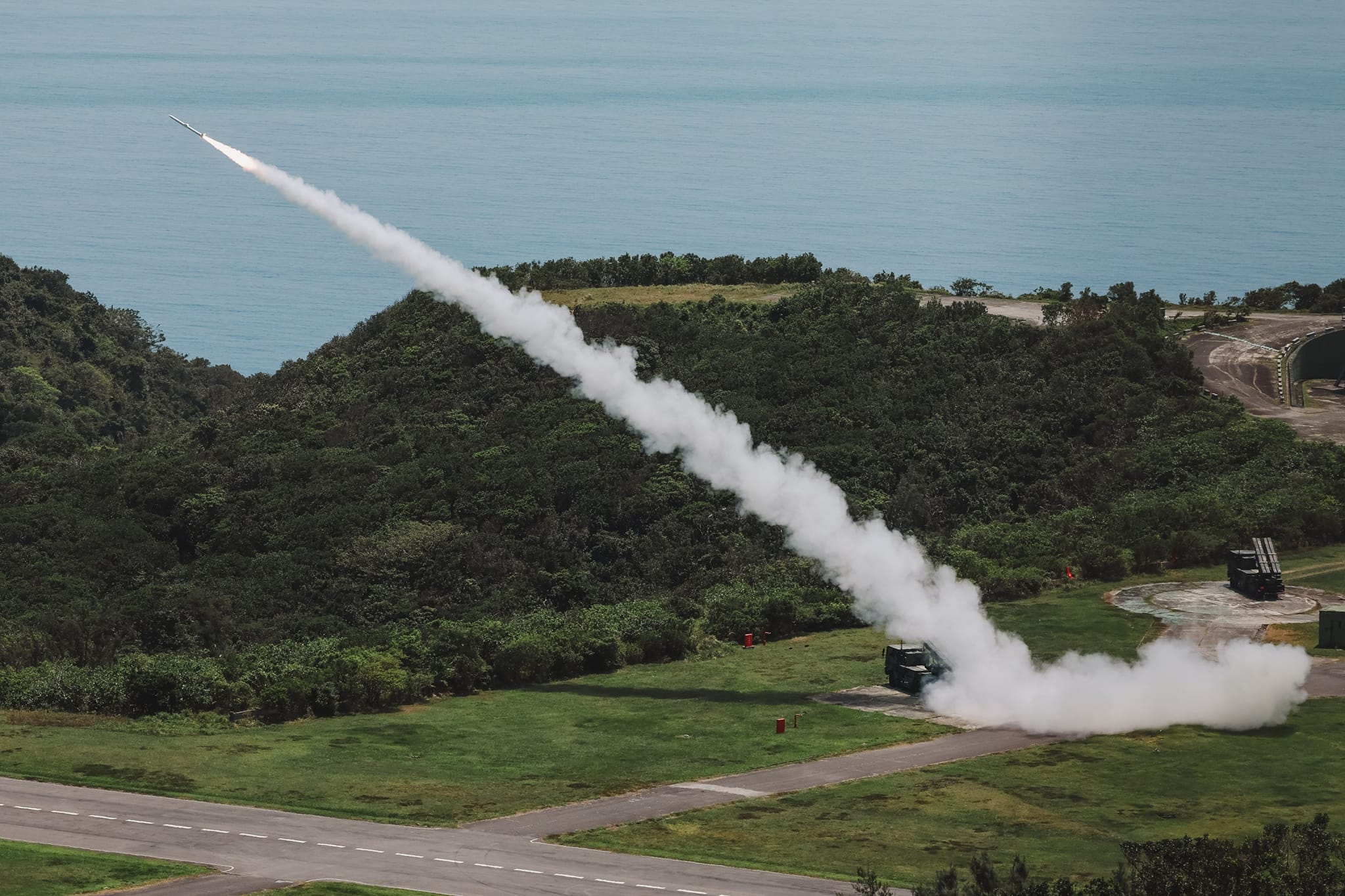
Land Sword 2 launch

== See also ==
- Republic of China Air Force
- List of equipment of the Republic of China Air Force
- Sky Bow
- Sky Sword I

=== Similar weapons ===
- PL-12
- AAM-4
- Astra
- R-77
- AIM-120 (and NASAMS)
- RIM-162 ESSM
- AGM-88 HARM
- Meteor
