= List of airports in Lebanon =

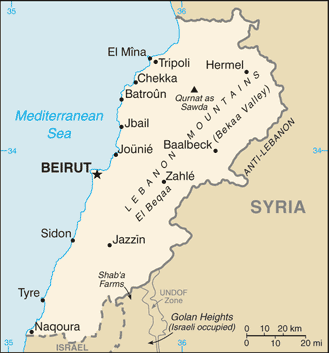
Map of Lebanon

This is a list of airports in Lebanon, grouped by type and sorted by location.

Lebanon, officially the Lebanese Republic, is a country in Western Asia, on the eastern shore of the Mediterranean Sea. It is bordered by Syria to the north and east, the Golan Heights to the southeast, and Israel to the south. Its capital and largest city is Beirut.

== Airports ==
Airport names shown in bold indicate the airport has scheduled service on commercial airlines.

Location served	ICAO	IATA	Airport name
Public airports
Beirut	OLBA	BEY	**Beirut–Rafic Hariri International Airport**
Qlaya’at	OLKA	KYE	**Rene Mouawad Airport**
Military Airfields
Rayak			Rayak Air Base
Qleiaat	OLKA	KYE	Rene Mouawad Air Base
Beirut			Beirut Air Base
Hamat			Wujah Al Hajar Air Base
Paramilitary airfields
Birket Jabbour			Jabbour Airfield
Closed airstrips
Baadaran			Baadaran Airstrip
Dekwaneh (Beirut)			Tal El Zaatar Airstrip
Keserwan			Mayrouba Airstrip
Abandoned Airfields
Baalbek			Baalbek Ayat (Iaat) Airfield
Marjayoun			Marjayoun Airfield
Demolished Airfields and Airports
Bir Hassan (Beirut)		BEY	Bir Hassan Airfield
Khalde		BEY	Old Beirut International Airport

== See also ==
- Transport in Lebanon
- List of the busiest airports in the Middle East
- List of airports by ICAO code: O#OL - Lebanon
- Wikipedia:WikiProject Aviation/Airline destination lists: Asia#Lebanon
