= Lebanese Air Force Aviation School =

- Active: 1960 - Present
- Country: Lebanon
- Type: Military Aviation School
- Part of: Lebanese Armed Forces, Lebanese Air Force
- Garrison/HQ: Rayak Air Base

The Lebanese Air Force Aviation School (Arabic: مدرسة القوات الجوية Madrasat al-Kouwat al-Jawiya) is a military school and part of the Lebanese Air Force, established in 1960. The school aims to qualify air force pilots, and is located at Rayak Air Base; however it is controlled by the air force command in Beirut Air Base. The school currently employs Robinson Raven R44 II helicopters of the Fifteenth Squadron for these training purposes.

== Mission ==
The school trains the air force pilots according to the needs of the trainees and according to the school's capabilities, taking into consideration the ongoing technological and military advancements. It also helps the army officers, who were transferred from the military academy for this purpose, by technically preparing them to fly jet planes and helicopters and giving them courses in air and ground tactics. The school gives other minor courses including foreign language courses in order to keep a high educational standard between their trainees. Pilots are always trained by the school, in compliance with the missions given forth by the colleges and schools of the Lebanese army.

== History ==
August 1, 1982 was the date in which the last air force officers were promoted from the school. During the Lebanese Civil War training was stopped, however after 4 years the trainees were sent for training programs abroad. In 1995, and after the army's new UH-1H helicopters supplied by United States, the trainees were transferred back to the school. Training activities resumed in 1997, and officers shifting in major were directed from the ground forces to the air force. Training in the school's original base was halted in that period until November 5, 2001, when 6 new officers were transferred to the air force in addition to 4 observing officers (promoted in 2003). In 2002, 3 officers also joined the school for a 2-years training period.

Prior to using the Robinson Raven R44 II starting 2005, the school used to train ab-initio on the UH-1 Iroquois helicopters; However, the Huey is still used later in the course during the advanced Helicopter Training.

== Program ==
- Ground School, which includes courses in Aerodynamics, aerial monitoring, introduction to the aircraft and sign communication with the watch tower. At the end of the first training sessions, the trainees take a test in order to see their progress. This test comes after a period of 15 hours of preliminary training.
- Second year, which encompasses general aviation and military courses in addition to several levels required to be passed:
  - Solo, the first level training period where the newly trained pilot takes a 30-minute aviation test.
  - Emergence Phase, a training period inside the periphery of the air base.
  - Combined Area, a training period outside the base's periphery.
- Third year, which includes training on a simulator, mountainous and low training, in addition to aviation, tactical and night aviation. This period ends by taking operational training and then the pilot joins specified groups after having passed a total period of 180 aerial flights.

=== Simulators ===
The Lebanese Air Force is interested in obtaining one UH-1 flight simulator, with training and logistical support. This requires upgrading the facilities of the school also.

== Achievements ==
In addition to the training courses given to the pilots, a training program was established for a period of 3 months. This program, which has been taken by 3 officers, teaches trainees to fly on newly supplied aircraft that undergo maintenance to test its endurance.

== See also ==
- Rayak Air Base
- Rene Mouawad Air Base
