= Baalbek Ayat (Iaat) Airfield =

Former Lebanese Air Force base in the Beqaa Valley

Iaat Airfield
- Iaat, in Lebanon

Location
- Shown within Lebanon
- Coordinates: 34°02′54″N 36°10′28″E

Site history
- Built: 1942
- Built by: British Army
- Fate: Demolished

Iaat Airfield is a closed abandoned Lebanese air force air base, located in the town Iaat, north of Baalbek in the Bekaa Valley.

== History ==
Iaat Airfield was built by the British during World War II. After Lebanon's independence from French control over Lebanon in 1943, Iaat airbase had only a brief history. It was later taken over by the Lebanese Air Force following independence in 1943, mainly used for landing and take-off training on piston engine aircraft. Later, its runways became non-serviceable and were utilised for air-to-ground shooting training. Iaat Airfield closed in the 1960s. However, the Iaat name was once again associated with military aviation in 2014, when satellite images revealed that Hezbollah had set up a drone airport not far from the old runways.
