= Wujah Al Hajar Air Base =

Airport in Lebanon

Hamat Air Base
- Arabic: قاعدة حامات الجوية
- Hamat, North Governorate in Lebanon

Site information
- Type: Air Base
- Owner: Lebanese Armed Forces
- Operator: Lebanese Air Force

Location
- Shown within Lebanon
- Coordinates: 34°17′0″N 35°42′0″E

Site history
- Built: 1970s
- In use: 1970s - present

Airfield information
- Identifiers: ICAO: Z19O
- Elevation: 256 metres (840 ft) AMSL
Runways
Direction	Length and surface
05/23	1,828 metres (5,997 ft) Asphalt

Hamat Air Base, (Arabic: قاعدة حامات الجوية) formerly known as Pierre Gemayel International Airport, is a Lebanese Air Force base in Hamat, Lebanon. It was built in the mid-1970s. The airport was however never used for civilian purposes. Although its heavily damaged runway (numerous holes as result of airstrikes) has been patched, the airfield is currently used only by the Lebanese Air Force with MD-530F Defenders helicopters and Super Tucano light attack aircraft. The airfield is also used by the Special Forces school.

== History ==
Originally, in 1975, a rudimentary dirt runway was established in Jounieh to accommodate military traffic that were diverted from Beirut. However, it was replaced by a new larger airport, being Pierre Gemayel International Airport. Construction of Pierre Gemayel International Airport began in 1976, and it was intended to accommodate joint-military and civilian operations. However, before completion, it came under control of the Syrian Army, which used it for its helicopters. In 2005, the Lebanese Army regained control of the airport and used it primarily for military operations.

== Air base aircraft ==
The base has the following aircraft:

- 5 Embraer A-29B Super Tucano counter insurgence planes
- 5 McDonnell Douglas MD-530F light attack helicopters (6 delivered:, one crashed on 5 January 2022:)
