= Rayak Air Base =

- IATA: none; ICAO: OLRA

Summary
- Airport type: Military
- Owner: Lebanese Armed Forces
- Operator: Lebanese Air Force
- Location: Rayak, Lebanon
- Opened: 1914
- Elevation AMSL: 2,953 ft (900 m)
- Coordinates: 33°51′08″N 35°59′25″E
- Interactive map of Rayak Air Base

Runways
Direction	Length		Surface
Direction	m	ft	Surface
04	3,039	9,970	Concrete
22	2,969	9,740	Concrete
- Home of first Squadron, Eighth squadron and Fifteenth Squadron

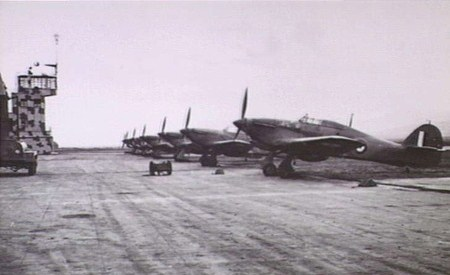
Hawker Hurricane fighters from No. 451 Squadron RAAF at Rayak in 1942

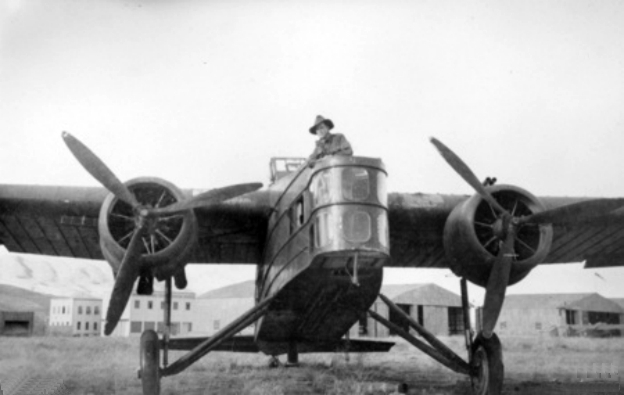
An Australian soldier (Clive H. Roughley) standing in the cockpit of a French Bloch MB.200 at Rayak in 1941

Rayak Air Base (Arabic: قاعدة رياق الجوية | Kaidat Rayak al-jawiya) (ICAO: OLRA) is Lebanon's first air base and the place where the Lebanese Air Force was born on June 1, 1949. In the 1950s, the RAF sent its own instructors to help the Lebanese Air Force. British families accompanied instructors. The base had connections with Air Force bases in Cyprus. It was an idyllic location situated very close to a vineyard which now supplies wines throughout Europe, including London. Located in the middle of the Bekaa Valley to the east, between the towns of Zahlé and Anjar, it symbolizes the Lebanese Air Force, and is home for most of the aircraft types that have seen service and the final resting place for almost all retiring planes.

The airfield has been in use since 1914 by various foreign forces such as German, Ottoman, British and French.

== History ==
=== During World War I ===
In 1914, Rayak Air Base initially started as a sand dirt runway constructed by German engineers from a Bavarian air regiment, who at the time were stationed in Ottoman Palestine aiding their Ottoman allies.

Rayak airfield was located in the strategically well-positioned town of Rayak for Operation 'Pascha II' during World War I.

=== During the French Mandate of Lebanon ===
After its liberation by the allies in 1920, Armee d'l'air personnel trained Lebanese Air Force technicians in aircraft maintenance. During the French Mandate of Lebanon, Rayak Air Base was considered to be the "jewel" of the Air bases and the centre of attraction of all other military units, not only in Lebanon but also in mandated Syria and all the Near East. The base had many entertainment facilities, luxuries, flowering gardens, and central heating, which at that time were not found in military sites elsewhere in the region.

=== During World War II ===
During World War II, German air planes again landed on Rayak's air base runway. Since the base was under the control of the Vichy France regime, which at the time was on friendly terms with the Nazis, German pilots on their way to Baghdad were given permission to land in the Beqaa Valley. In a memoir, author Roald Dahl recounts an event in the Syria-Lebanon campaign of 1941 when British forces defeated forces of Vichy France in the area. He, as part of a formation of Royal Air Force Hawker Hurricane fighters, attacked the Rayak airfield, which was being used by Vichy pilots. He says that as he and his fellow Hurricane pilots swept in:

...low over the field at midday we saw to our astonishment a bunch of girls in brightly coloured cotton dresses standing out by the planes with glasses in their hands having drinks with the French pilots, and I remember seeing bottles of wine standing on the wing of one of the planes as we went swooshing over. It was a Sunday morning and the Frenchmen were evidently entertaining their girlfriends and showing off their aircraft to them, which was a very French thing to do in the middle of a war at a front-line aerodrome. Every one of us held our fire on that first pass over the flying field and it was wonderfully comical to see the girls all dropping their wine glasses and galloping in their high heels for the door of the nearest building. We went round again, but this time we were no longer a surprise and they were ready for us with their ground defences, and I am afraid that our chivalry resulted in damage to several of our Hurricanes, including my own. But we destroyed five of their planes on the ground.

After defeat of the Vichy forces, Rayak was used by Allied air forces, including 451 Squadron of the Royal Australian Air Force.

=== After Lebanon gained Independence ===
On 1 August 1945, Lebanon took command of its armed forces, including Rayak Air Base.

The French Air Force evacuated the base in 1949, and it was abandoned for a long time, which contributed to turning it into a miserable condition, especially after being looted by its own guards. The army command later decided to rebuild the air base, a reconstruction that took two months and which included the construction of new buildings and infrastructure.

The first officers assigned to the base were:

- Deputy Commander Lt. Ahmad Arab
- Administrative officer Antranik Tatoussian
- Service battalion officer Victor Charles

Recruitment started with one hundred personnel, many of whom already had experience with the French. The first course students included:

- Lt. Ali Abboud
- Sergeant John Ayoub
- Sergeant Izat Hariri
- Civil pilot Hassan Badawi
- Civil pilot René Abdallah
- Civil pilot Michel Charles
- Civil pilot Michel Nawfal or Michel Naufal
- Civil pilot Emil Succar

== Facilities ==
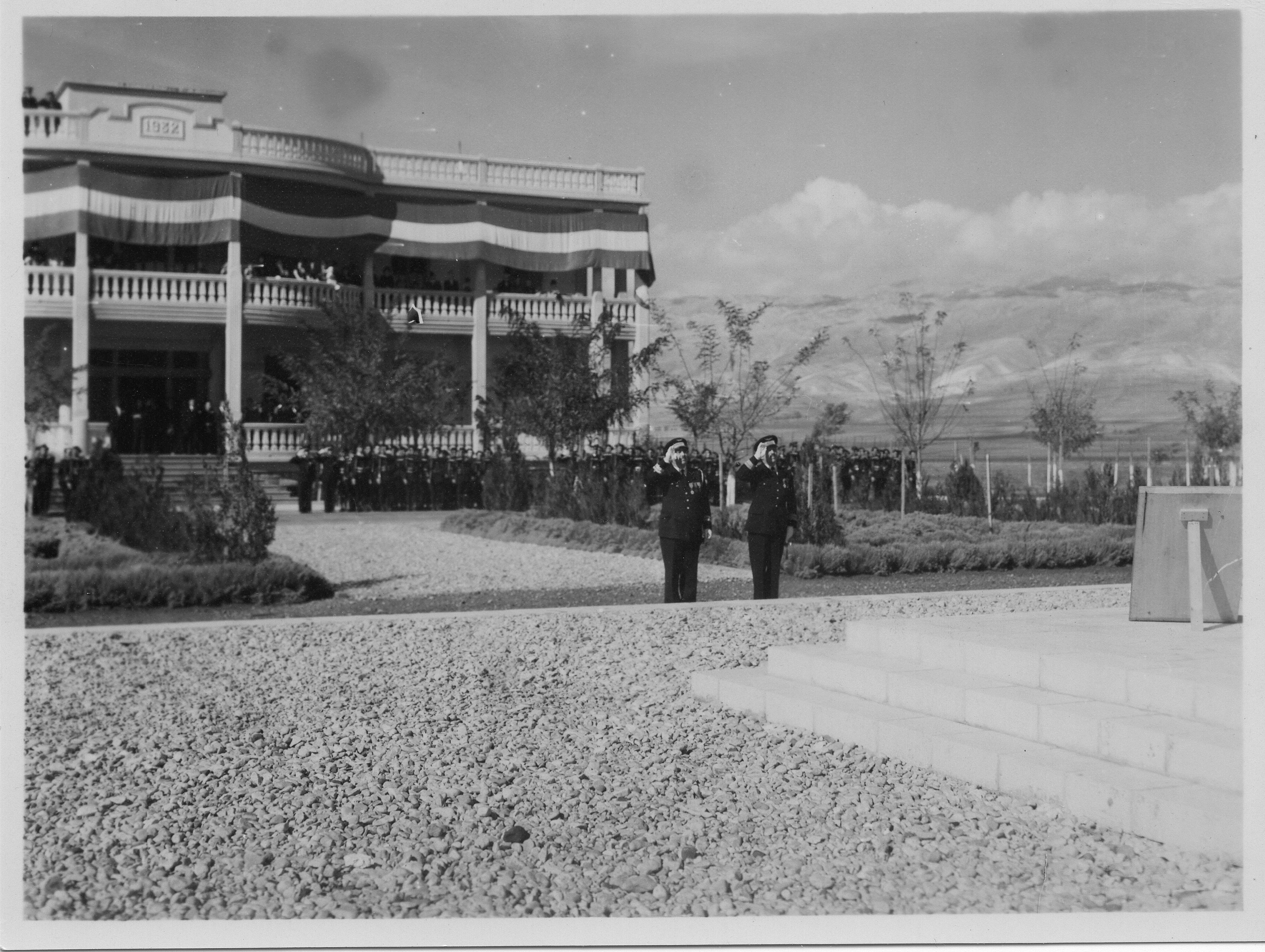
Officials before WWII

An administration building, several hangars (most of these built during the French Mandate of Lebanon), a control tower, officers club, houses, parachutes tower, barracks, and workshops make up the airport. In addition, both runways are equipped with a low intensity runway lights (LIRL) lighting system.

== Aviation School & technical ==
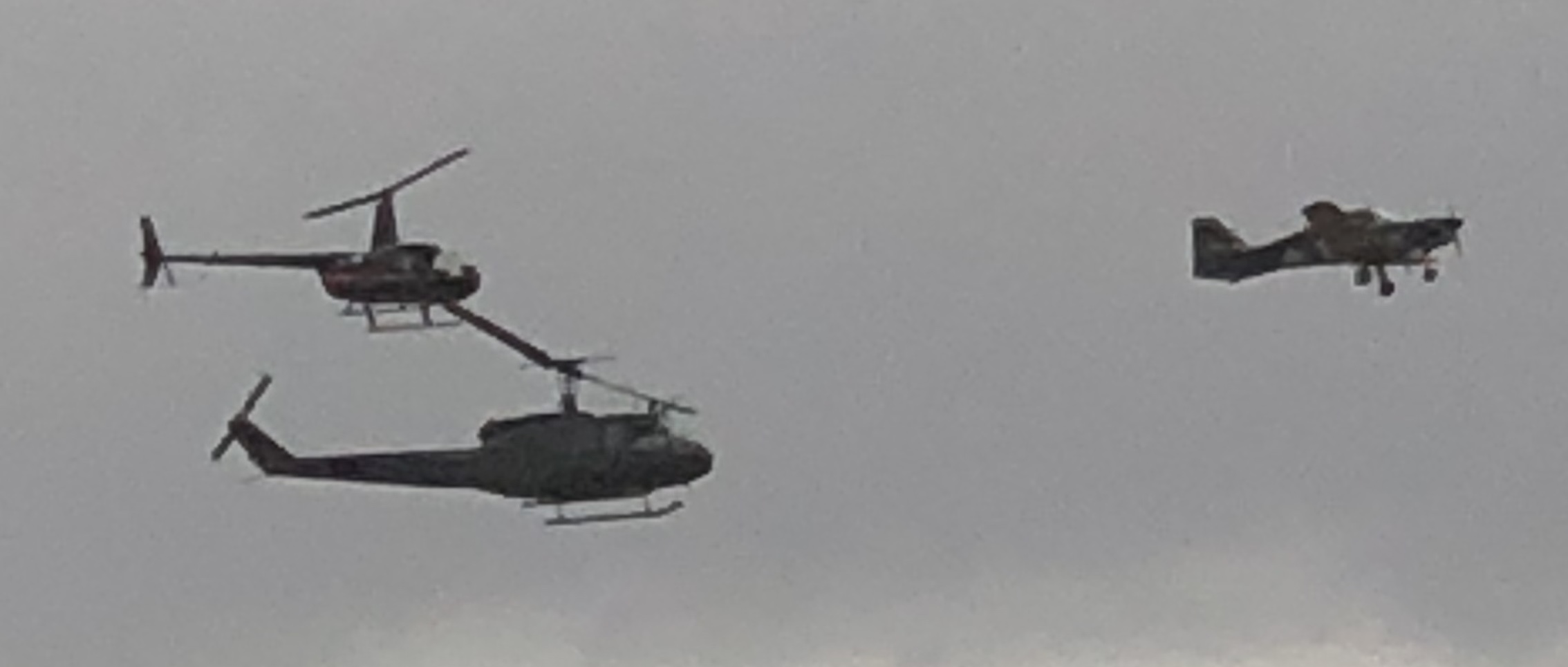
Lebanese Air Force Aviation School aircraft

The airbase is the home of the Lebanese Air Force Aviation School which trains air force pilots. The school currently employs Robinson Raven R44 II helicopters and Bulldog T1 propeller for these training purposes.

The Lebanese Air Force Technical School is also located at Rayak Air Base. Its goal is to qualify technicians for the whole air force.

The base is home to the only flight simulator in the Lebanese military. A new facility housing a UH-1 Helicopter simulator from the US military is now being used to train future Lebanese pilots.

== Lebanon Air Force Museum ==
Rayak Air Base is also home to the Lebanese Air Force Museum, as it contains all of the old aircraft and the majority of grounded aircraft. The museum is not open to the public, however, and visitors must obtain permission to visit from air force authorities.

The museum displays inckude:

- L-130 -1 T6 Texan
- L-10 -1 de Havilland Dove
- L-154 -1 de Havilland Vampire T55
- L-271- 1 Hawker Hunter F6
- L-302- 1 Sud Aviation SE3130 Alouette II
- L-329-1 Sud Aviation SA316B Alouette III
- L-602-1 Fouga CM170 Magister
- L-801-1 Aerospatiale SA342L Gazelle

The museum comprises one hangar and is intended to become a public museum in the future.

== Hawker Hunters ==
Lebanon's Hawker Hunter jets, much like the rest of its grounded fixed-wing jets, are stored at Rayak. In 2007 the LAF began the process of restoring the Hunters to airworthy condition. Initially these were to be used against the Fatah al-Islam terrorist group which the army was battling during the Nahr el-Bared Operation, but this operation ended before the air force was able to complete their restoration. During November 2008, the air force made three Hunters operational, and displayed them during Lebanon's 65th independence anniversary on November 22, 2008. The base has always been considered to be the home of those aircraft; however, during the eighties the Hunters had to move to Hallat strip due to the close proximity of the air base to Syria. The Hunters later returned to the base, yet were grounded during 1994. All fights during 2008, after restoration, were carried out from this base.

== Attacks ==
Like the rest of Lebanon's airports, the runways at Rayak were bombed by the Israeli Air Force on July 13, 2006, during the 2006 Lebanon War. A bomb on each runway was sufficient to punch deep holes and render the airport disabled.

== Planned redevelopment and conversion to a civilian airport ==
Ever since Lebanon's broader efforts to expand its aviation infrastructure beyond Beirut Airport by the reopening of Qlayaat airport for civilian use by the Lebanese government on June 6, 2026, there have been similar plans to convert Rayak Air Base into a civil airport in order to serve the Bekaa Valley region. All plans are currently in the preliminary study and legislative proposal stage. No concrete plans for reconstruction have yet started.

== Notable visits ==
- September 1, 1942, General de Gaulle
- September 26, 1949, Marquise de Freij and his wife
- On October 17, 1949, the British General Hayes, the supreme commander of the British troops in the Middle East, visited Rayak Air Base and had lunch with its officers and the British squad there.
- November 28, 1954, US Air Force Commander in West Tripoli General Glandburg

== See also ==
- Beirut Air Base
- Rene Mouawad Air Base
