= Beirut Air Base =

Coordinates: 33°49′16″N 35°29′18″E

Beirut Air Base قاعدة بيروت الجوية
- IATA: none; ICAO: none

Summary
- Airport type: Military
- Owner: Lebanese Armed Forces
- Operator: Lebanese Air Force
- Location: Beirut, Lebanon
- Occupants: Eight Squadron, Tenth Squadron, and Eleventh Squadron
- Elevation AMSL: 87 ft / 27 m
- Interactive map of Beirut Air Base

Runways
Direction	Length		Surface
Direction	m	ft	Surface
03/21	3,800	12,467	Concrete
16/34	3,395	11,138	Concrete
- Occupies part of the west end of the Beirut Rafic Hariri International Airport

Beirut Air Base (Arabic: قاعدة بيروت الجوية Kaidat Bayrut al-jawiya) is a military base owned by the Lebanese Armed Forces and operated by the Lebanese Air Force. It is located 9 km (5.6 mi) from the city center in the southern suburbs of Beirut, Lebanon.

Currently, the Lebanese Air Force occupies part of the west end of the Beirut Rafic Hariri International Airport and has been the base of most of the helicopter force for almost 50 years, which include the Hawker Hunters, Fouga Magisters and other aircraft during certain periods.

== History ==
After the formation of the air force, the Beirut Air Base was established in 1950. During the early years, Rayak was the main air base; however, the air force wanted to establish another air base close to the capital and after studying most of the areas around Beirut, it was concluded that the new site for the Beirut International airport in Khalde was best fit.

== Inventory ==
- 30 Huey II Helicopters
- 2 Twin Huey Helicopters (3 more to be restored)
- 3 Cessna 208 Caravan close air support planes
- AW139 Presidential Helicopter

The Twin Huey's will have multiple role purposes like fire-fighting, utility and patrolling the ocean to protect the oil extraction as well as modifications for light attack purposes.

== See also ==
- Rayak Air Base
- Rene Mouawad Air Base
