= Bir Hassan Airfield =

Defunct airport in Beirut

Bir Hassan Airport مطار بير حسن
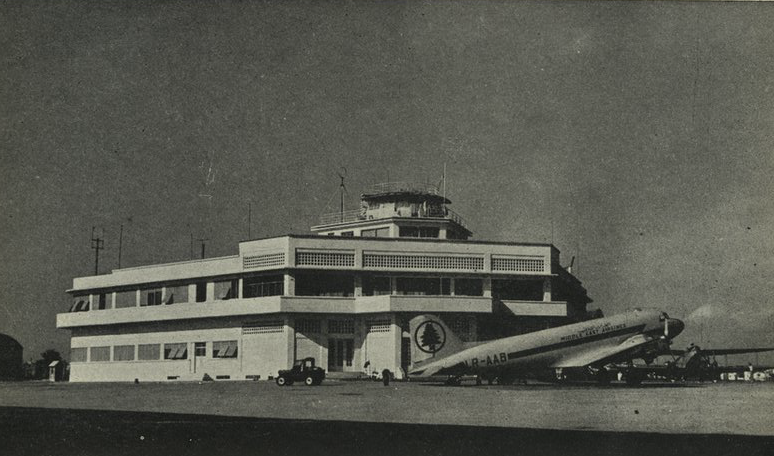
- Beirut Airport in 1947
- IATA: none; ICAO: none

Summary
- Airport type: Public / Military
- Owner: Lebanese Government
- Operator: French Mandate authorities / Lebanese Air Force
- Serves: Beirut
- Location: Bir Hassan, Dahieh, Beirut Governorate, Lebanon
- Opened: 6 June 1939
- Closed: 1950
- Passenger services ceased: 1950
- Built: 1939
- In use: 1939–1950
- Occupants: French Vichy authorities, British & Free French Forces (WWII), later Lebanese Air Force
- Time zone: UTC+2 (+2)
  - Summer (DST): UTC+3 ()
- Coordinates: 33°51′23″N 35°29′19″E

Map
- Shown within Lebanon

Bir Hassan Airfield was Beirut, Lebanon first commercial airport, as well as Beirut's first military airfield before the construction of Old Beirut International Airport, and later the new more modern Beirut–Rafic Hariri International Airport and Beirut Air Base.

== History ==
Bir Hassan Airfield was located a short distance south of Beirut city center in the sandy area of Bir Hassan, Dahieh and a short distance north of the current modern Beirut-Rafic Hariri International Airport. Bir Hassan Airfield was established on June 6, 1939, by the French mandate authorities of Lebanon, before Lebanon was yet an independent country. Bir Hassan included a passenger terminal, air sheds and a control tower. During World War II, Bir Hassan air field was used as a military airfield by the French Vichy authorities of Greater Lebanon. Then when the allies recaptured Lebanon in Operation Exporter in the Syria–Lebanon campaign, the British occupation forces along with the Free French Forces expanded and transformed Bir Hassan Airfield into a class A airfield to match their needs for a modern military field and to play a role in the broader war effort. After World War II Bir Hassan airfield was reactivated for civilian use used as a commercial international airport, but the airport retained some of it wartime infrastructure, with some WW2 - era structures remaining visible.

The following Royal Air Force squadrons were here at RAF Beirut at some point:

- No. 80 Squadron RAF detachment during 1941
- No. 127 Squadron RAF detachment between 1943 and 1944
- No. 208 Squadron RAF detachment during 1943
- No. 260 Squadron RAF detachment during 1941
- No. 261 Squadron RAF detachment during 1942

== Replacement ==
Bir Hassan Airfield was replaced by the newer much bigger and modern Beirut international airport, known as the old Beirut international airport located further south of Bir Hassan airport in the area of Khalde, south of Beirut in 1950. Because Beirut city was expanding rapidly, and the very close proximity of Bir Hassan airport to Beirut's city center, as well as its limited capacity for modern jets, all these factors did not align with Lebanon's economic view of future at the time.,

== Legacy of Bir Hassan Airfield ==
Although Bir Hassan Airfield is now demolished, its legacy holds historical significance as Lebanon and Beirut city first civil commercial international airport and as military airfield site used by the allies during World War II to help win the war effort. Bir Hassan airport helped connect Lebanon with the rest of the world via the air travel route. But it was the much more modern Beirut international airport, known as the old Beirut international airport that put Lebanon in the spot light as the center of aviation in the middle east at the time.
