= Wings of Lebanon =

Lebanese airline

IATA	ICAO	Call sign
W7	WLB	WINGS LEBANON
- Founded: 2006
- Ceased operations: 26 August 2020
- Operating bases: Beirut Airport
- Fleet size: 1
- Headquarters: Beirut, Lebanon
- Website: wingsoflebanon.com.lb

Wings of Lebanon (Arabic: أجنحة لبنان) was a privately held Lebanese airline, which began operations in 2006.

== History ==
In July 2016 the airline expanded its business model from pure operations to also include largely seasonal scheduled international passenger services from its main base at Beirut Rafic Hariri International Airport. The carrier has historically operated one Boeing 737-300 (OD-HAJ), and has catered for seasonal peaks using a variety of wet-leased narrow body Airbus or Boeing aircraft. On 20 May 2018, Wings of Lebanon took delivery of their first Boeing 737-700 aircraft.

On 26 August 2020, Wings of Lebanon announced that they were to suspend operations, citing the COVID-19 pandemic and the economic situation in Lebanon as the reason for ending operations.

== Destinations ==
Wings of Lebanon operated the following routes:

Georgia

- Tbilisi - Tbilisi International Airport (seasonal)

Germany

- Berlin - Berlin Schönefeld Airport

Greece

- Corfu - Corfu International Airport (seasonal)
- Mykonos - Mykonos Airport (seasonal)

Lebanon

- Beirut - Rafic Hariri International Airport (hub)

Sweden

- Stockholm - Stockholm Arlanda Airport (seasonal)

Turkey

- Antalya - Antalya Airport (seasonal)
- İzmir - İzmir Adnan Menderes Airport

== Fleet ==
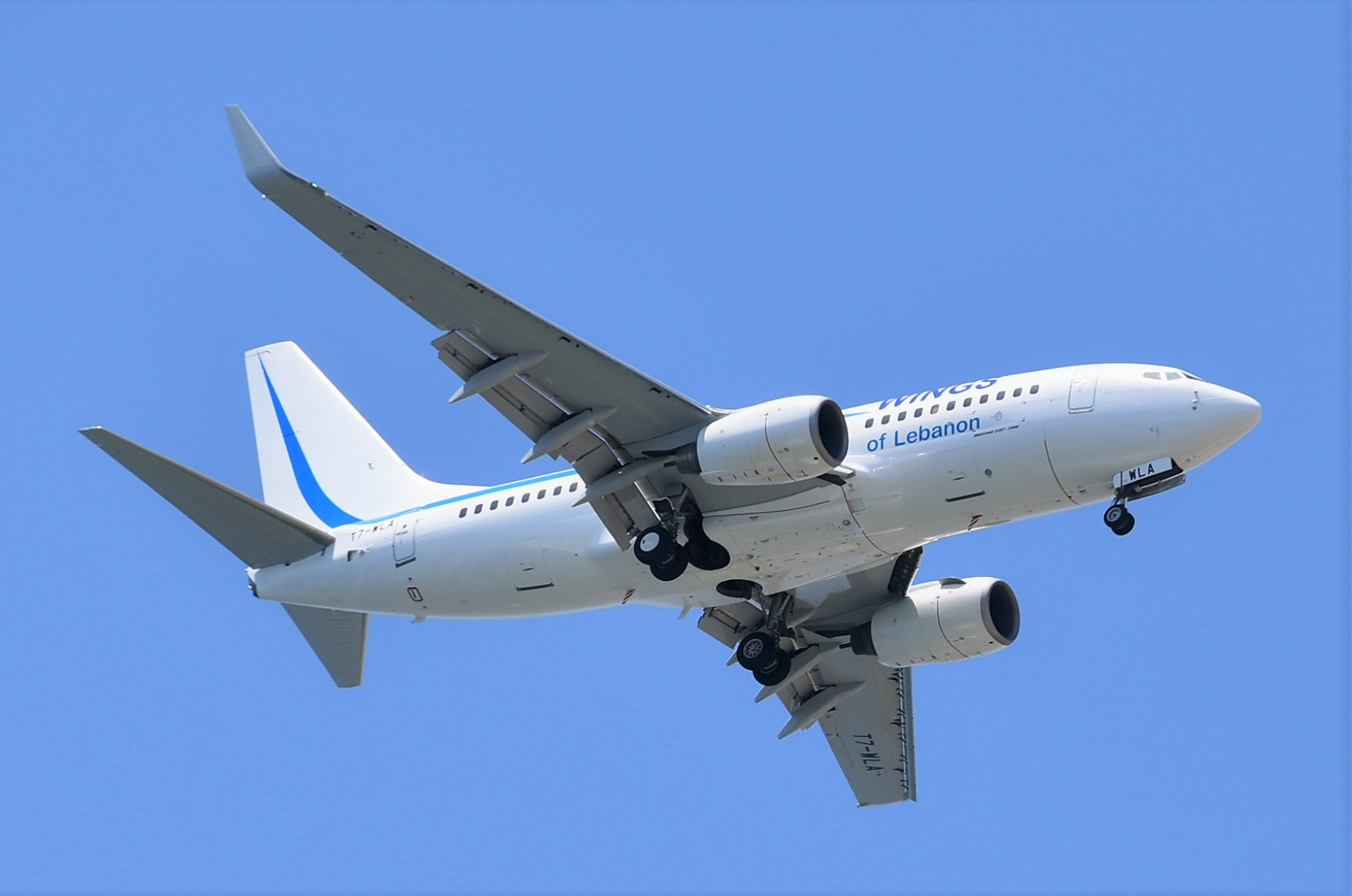
Wings of Lebanon Boeing 737-700

Prior to closure, The Wings of Lebanon fleet consisted of the following aircraft:

Wings of Lebanon fleet
Aircraft	In service	Orders	Passengers
Boeing 737-700	1	—	148
Total	1	—	

=== Former fleet ===
The historic fleet of Wings of Lebanon fleet is as follows:

- Boeing 737-300 (OD-HAJ) (Returned to lessor)
