= McDonnell Douglas MD 500 Defender =

Light utility and scout helicopter

MD 500 Defender
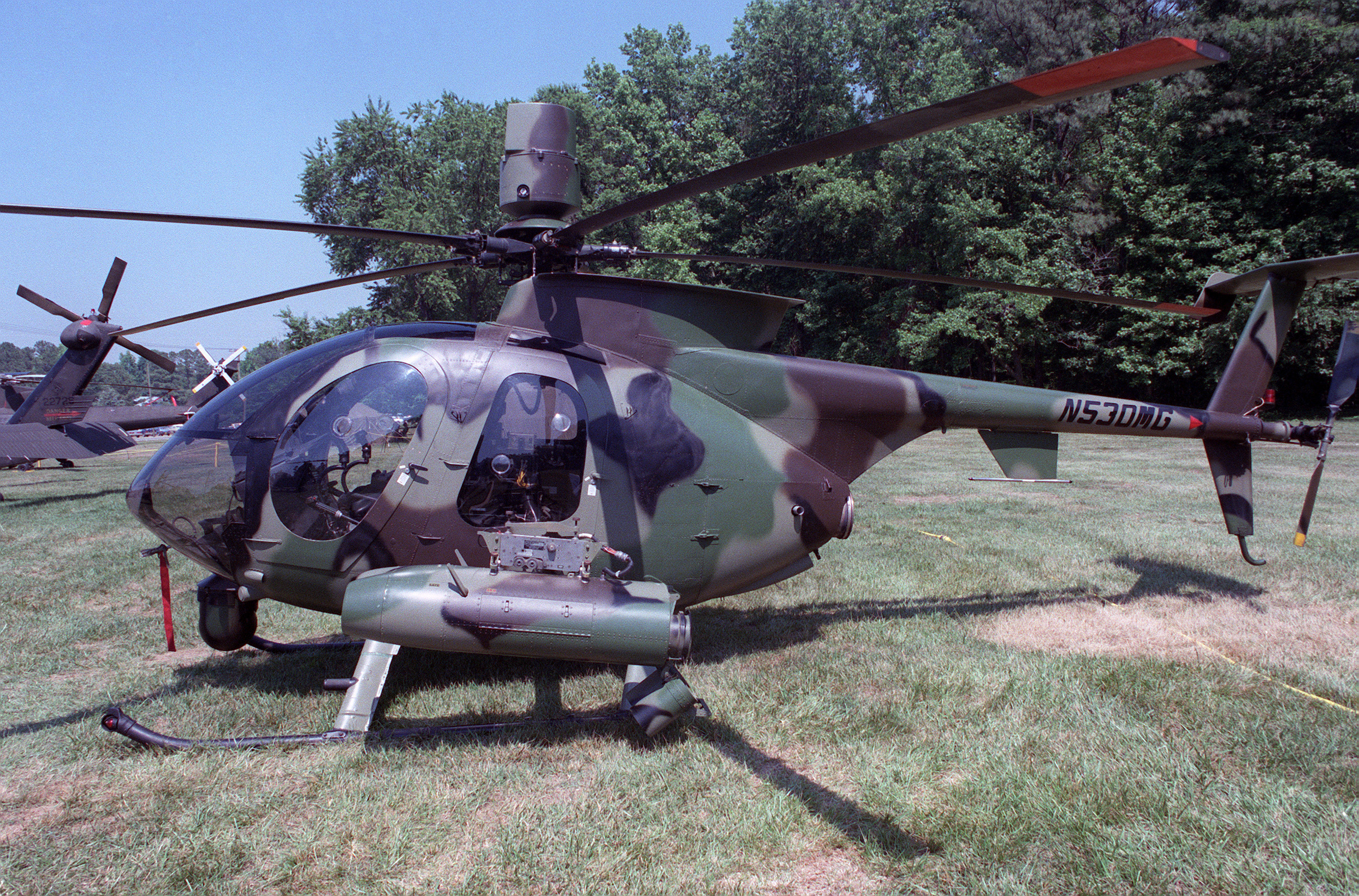
- Hughes 530MG, on display at PROLOG '85

General information
- Type: Light multi-role military helicopter
- National origin: United States
- Manufacturer: Hughes Helicopters; McDonnell Douglas Helicopter Systems; MD Helicopters
- Status: In service
- Primary users: Republic of Korea Army Iraqi Air Force; Israeli Air Force; Philippine Air Force
- Number built: 471

History
- Manufactured: 1976–present
- First flight: 1976
- Developed from: Hughes OH-6 Cayuse; MD Helicopters MD 500

The McDonnell Douglas Helicopter Systems MD 500 Defender is a light multi-role military helicopter based on the MD 500 light utility helicopter and OH-6 Cayuse Light Observation Helicopter.

== Design and development ==
During the Vietnam War, the original OH-6 Cayuse helicopter performed admirably as a light helicopter. A market for light multi-mission helicopters with better equipment fit than the OH-6 and Model 500M was identified by the designers at Hughes. The resulting design was the Model 500MD Defender which first flew in 1976. It was tailored for specific roles including unarmed observation and an armed scout helicopter equipped with TOW anti-tank missiles. An anti-submarine version was developed with a search radar, magnetic anomaly detector and the capability to carry lightweight aerial torpedoes.

Customers like Kenya, who could purchase a functional anti-armor helicopter for less than half the price of a gunship such as the AH-1 Cobra or the AH-64 Apache, were drawn to the helicopter. Israel used the Defender extensively during the conflicts of the late 1970s and 1980s against Syrian armored forces.

The Defender was later built as an improved version as the MD530MG, with increased engine power, handling, avionics, and a redesigned forward fuselage. Later developments included a mast mounted sight (MMS).

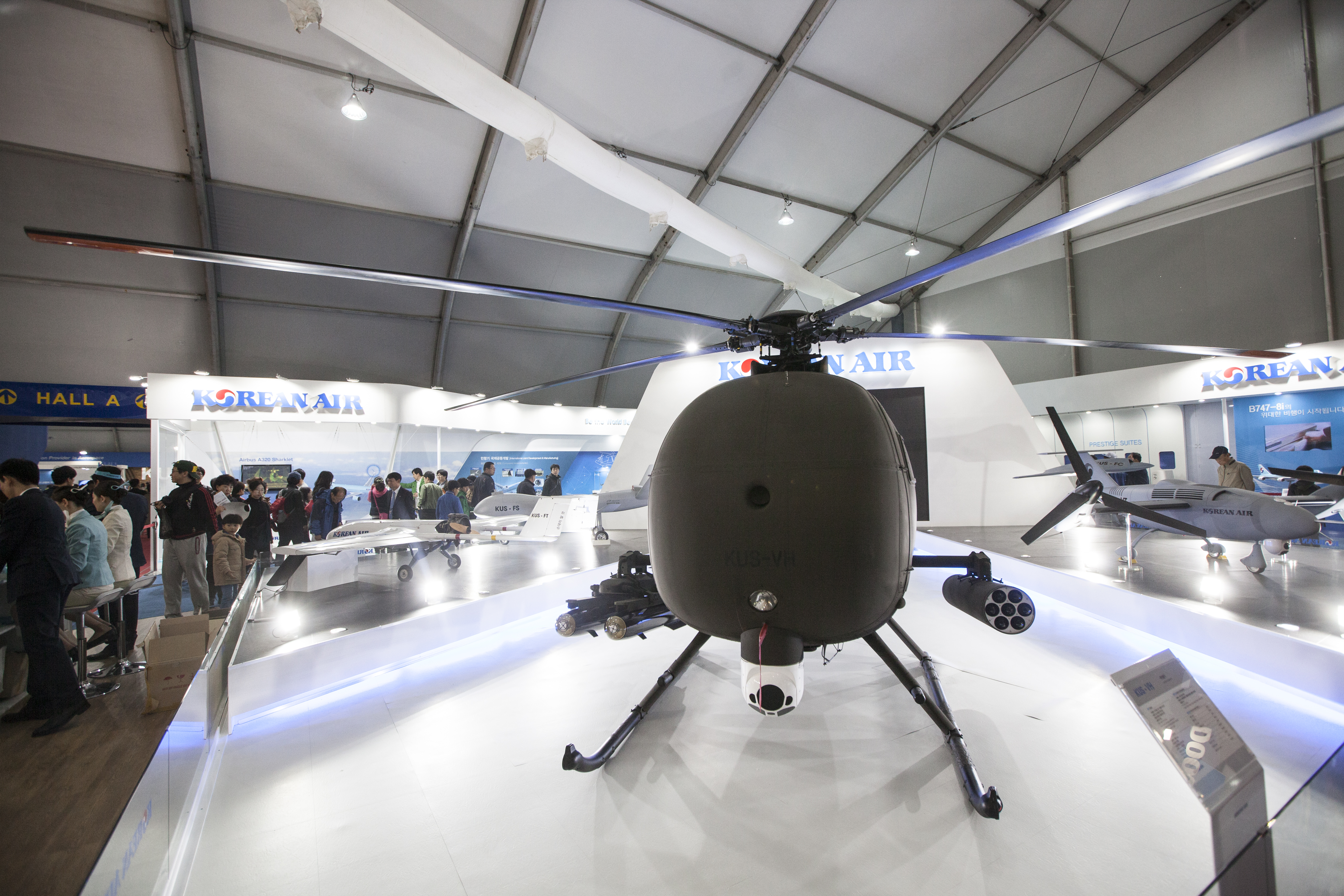
Korean Air Unmanned System-Vertical Helicopter (KUS-VH)

In December 2012, Boeing demonstrated their Unmanned Little Bird to the South Korean Army. The pilotless aircraft flew autonomously in a 25-minute demonstration for the purpose of showing unmanned capabilities technologies, such as enhanced ISR and resupply, in the system that could be integrated into Army MD 500 helicopters. In October 2015, Korean Air Aerospace Division (KAL-ASD) unveiled a mock-up of their unmanned MD 500, designated the Korean Air Unmanned System-Vertical Helicopter (KUS-VH), featuring blacked out windows, a large fuel tank where the rear seats would be that extends endurance to four hours, and an armament of two Hellfire missiles and a 2.75 in (70 mm) rocket pod; unlike Boeing's optionally manned and unarmed ULB, the KUS-VH is completely unmanned and armed as well as having an EO/IR sensor. The KUS-VH is envisioned to perform missions including ISR, attack, aerial delivery, coast guard, amphibious landing support, and emergency reinforcement to back up manned helicopter units. A KUS-VH unit would consist of two to four aircraft and sensor packages, a ground control system and ground support system, and it could operate alone or in conjunction with manned attack helicopters. A request for proposals for an unmanned scout helicopter is expected in 2016–2017, for which the company says making the up to 175 MD 500s unmanned would be a cheap way of reusing them after retirement from service over the next 10 years for safely performing dangerous attack missions.

MD Helicopters had submitted a version called the MD 540F in the U.S. Army's Armed Aerial Scout program. This caused Boeing to try to block MD Helicopters from participating, citing agreements the companies struck in 2005 to offer the Mission Enhanced Little Bird in the Armed Reconnaissance Helicopter program. As part of the venture, MD Helicopters sold intellectual property related to the aircraft's design. The two companies lost the bid and the program was ultimately cancelled. When MD Helicopters disclosed plans to offer the MD 540F in the AAS program in April 2012, Boeing claimed that they could not sell any "similarly configured" aircraft to any U.S. or foreign military organization. Boeing offered their AH-6 in the competition. MD Helicopters said Boeing did not object to previous sales to armed forces and governments in Japan, Jordan, and Italy, as well as to U.S. special operations, and local U.S. police forces. Restrictions on selling aircraft similar to the Little Bird, domestically or to foreign users, would have put the company out of business. In July 2013, a federal court ruled that MD Helicopters could not be blocked from offering their aircraft. The Army ended the AAS program in late 2013.

== Variants ==
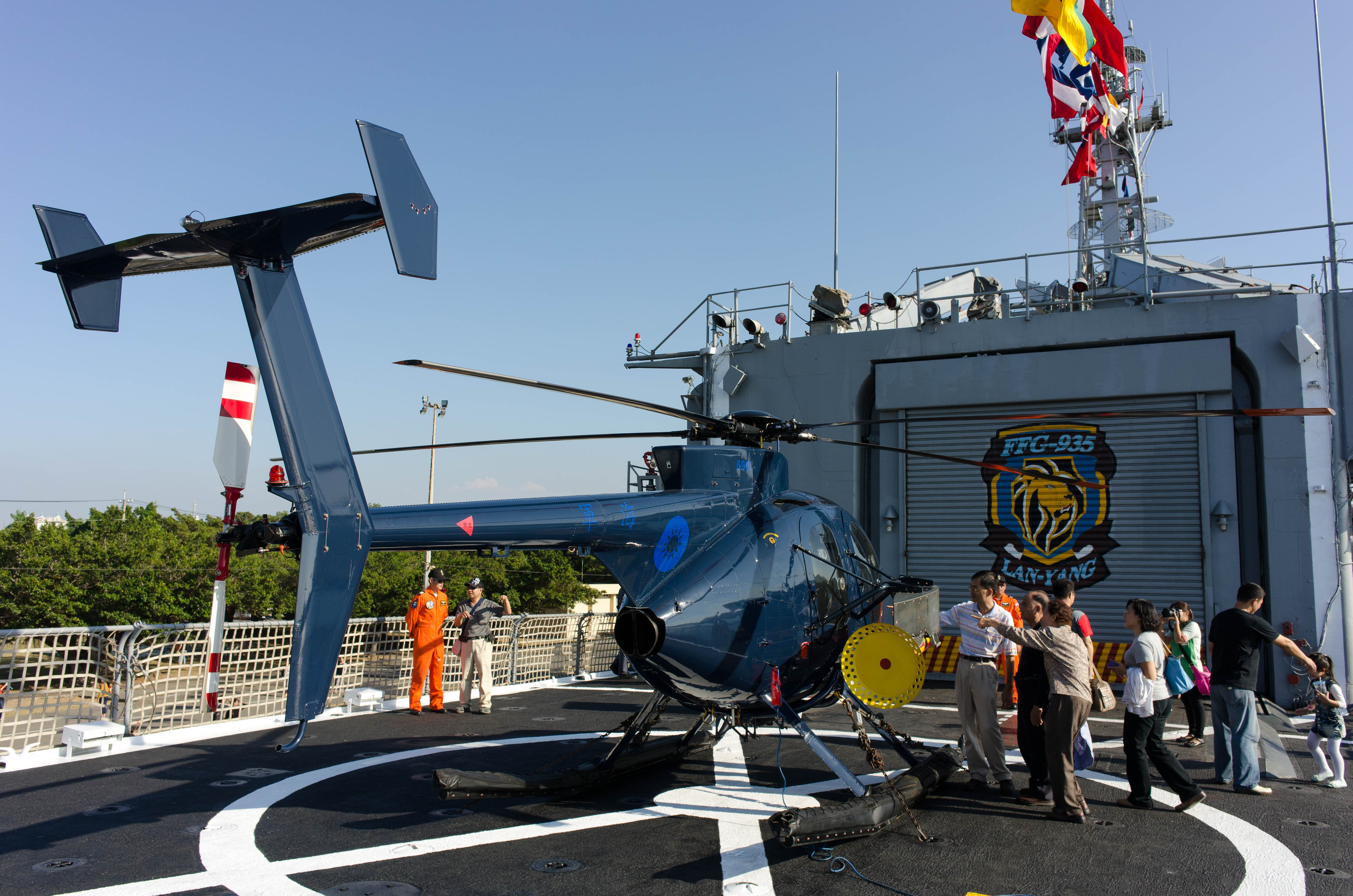
ROCN Hughes 500MD/ASW Defender 6910 carried on Lan Yang (FFG-935)

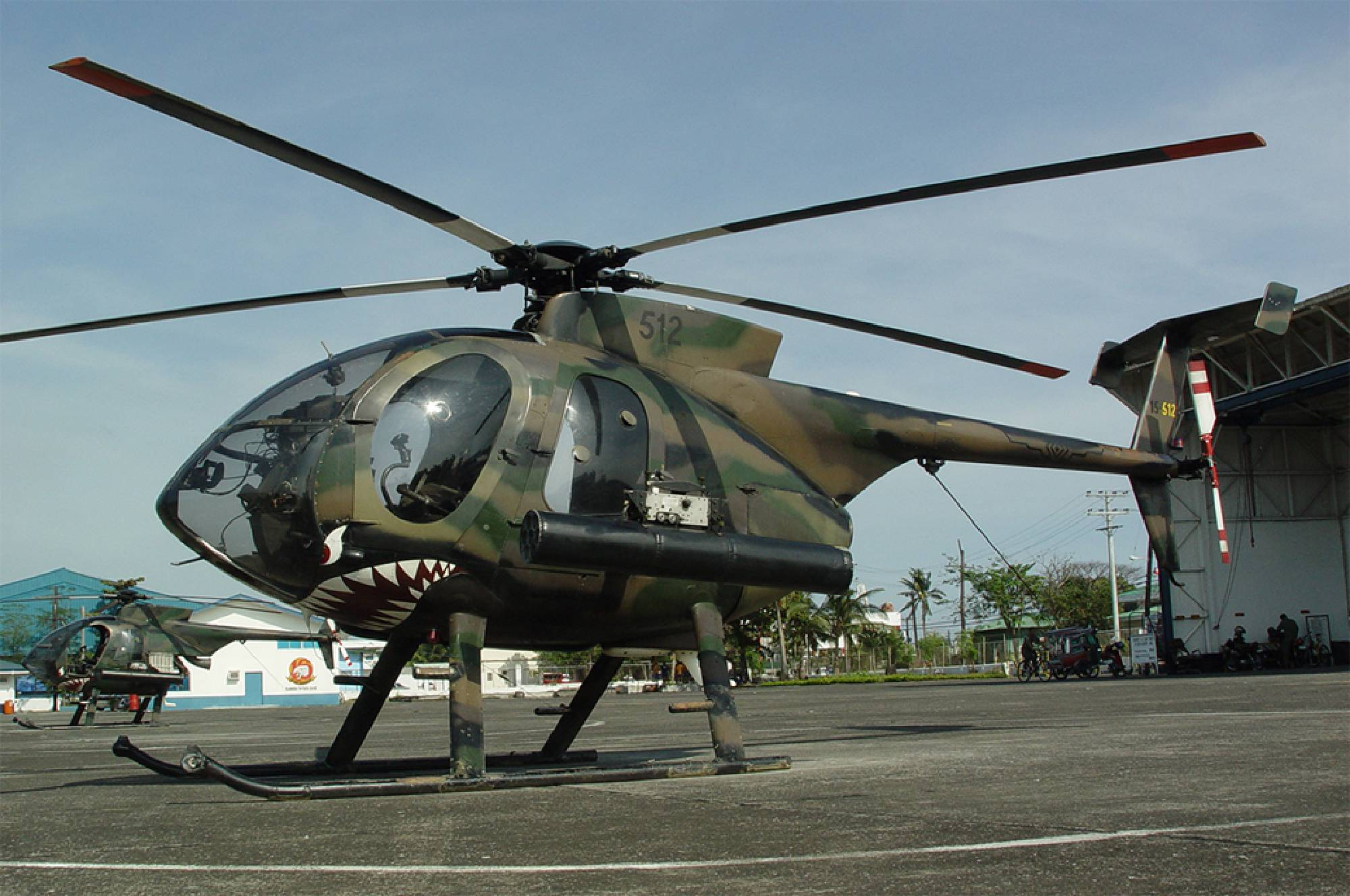
Philippine Air Force MD 520MG light attack helicopters

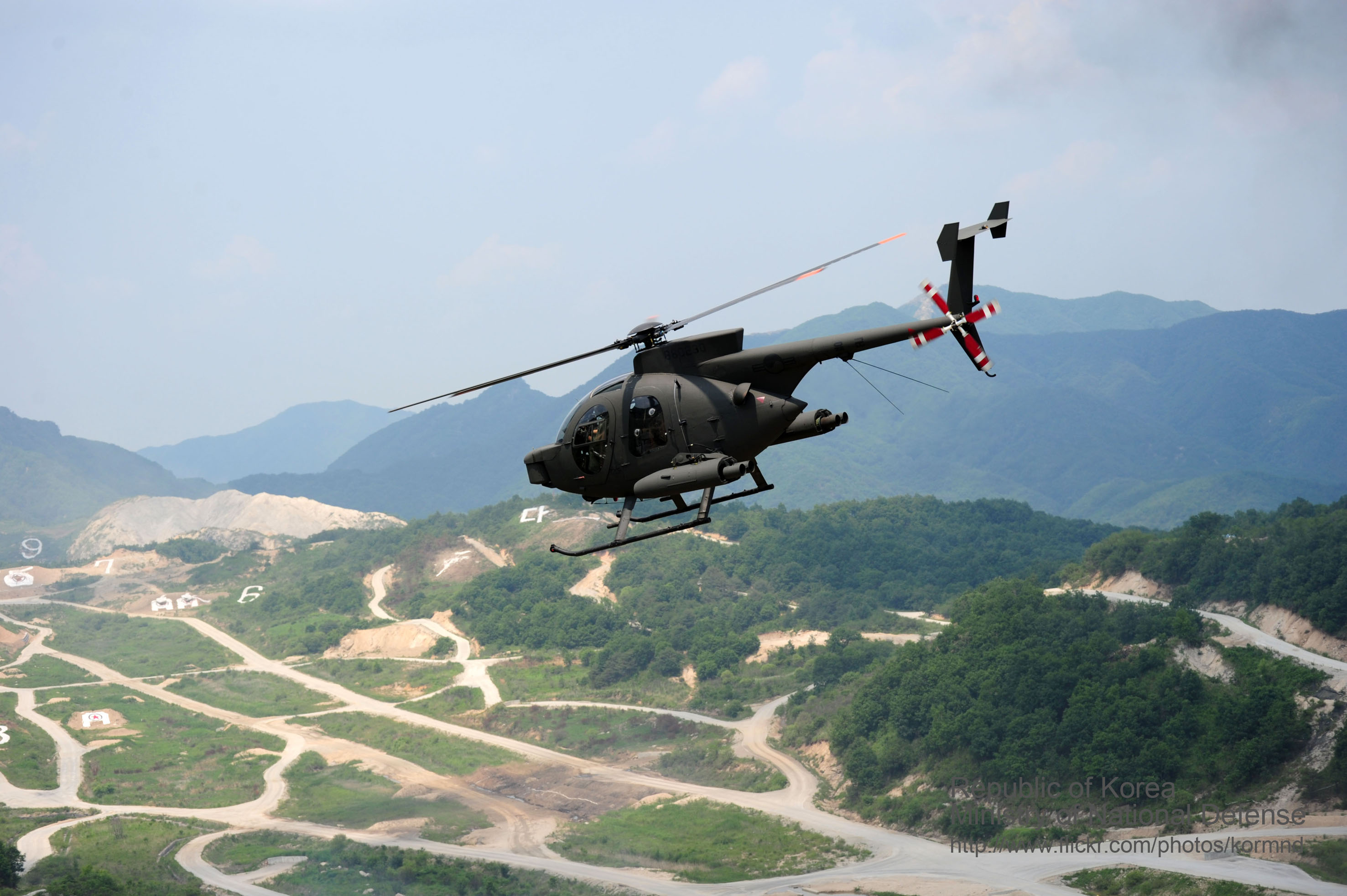
MD500 Defender in Korea

500D Scout Defender
Armed reconnaissance version
500M Defender
Military export version of the 500 and 500C, built under license by Kawasaki in Japan (as the OH-6J) and Breda Nardi in Italy.
500M/ASW Defender
Export version for the Spanish Navy.
NH-500E
Built under license by Breda Nardi (Agusta) since 1990
NH-500M Defender
Italian-built version of the 500M Defender. Licensed by Breda Nardi before merge with Agusta.
500MD Defender
Military version of the 500D. Korean Air's aerospace division from 1976 to 1984 with 200 choppers made. 50 were armed with TOW anti-tank missiles and 150 choppers used for transportation and support duties. Retired 500MDs donated to Kenya for Kenyan-led peacekeeping operations.
500MD/ASW Defender
Maritime version of the 500MD Defender. Equipped with a Bendix RDR-1300 search radar in a nose cone offset to the port side, and a towed ASQ-81C(V)2 magnetic anomaly detector (MAD) at the starboard fuselage. Up to two Mk 44 or Mk 46 torpedoes are carried underneath the fuselage, which can be replaced by smoke markers.
500MD/TOW Defender
Anti-tank version of the 500MD Defender, armed with TOW anti-tank missiles.
500MD/MMS-TOW Defender
Anti-tank version, fitted with a mast-mounted sight, armed with TOW anti-tank missiles.
500MD Quiet Advanced Scout Defender
Fitted with noise suppression equipment.
500MD Defender II
Improved version.
500MG Defender
Military version of the 500E.
520MG Defender
Philippine Air Force version built 32 Brand New units delivered in 1990. Modified 500MG Defender that carries .50 (12.7 mm) caliber machine guns and 7-tube rocket pods and operates as a light attack aircraft.
520MK Black Tiger
South Korean-built military version, built by Korean Air Aerospace Division

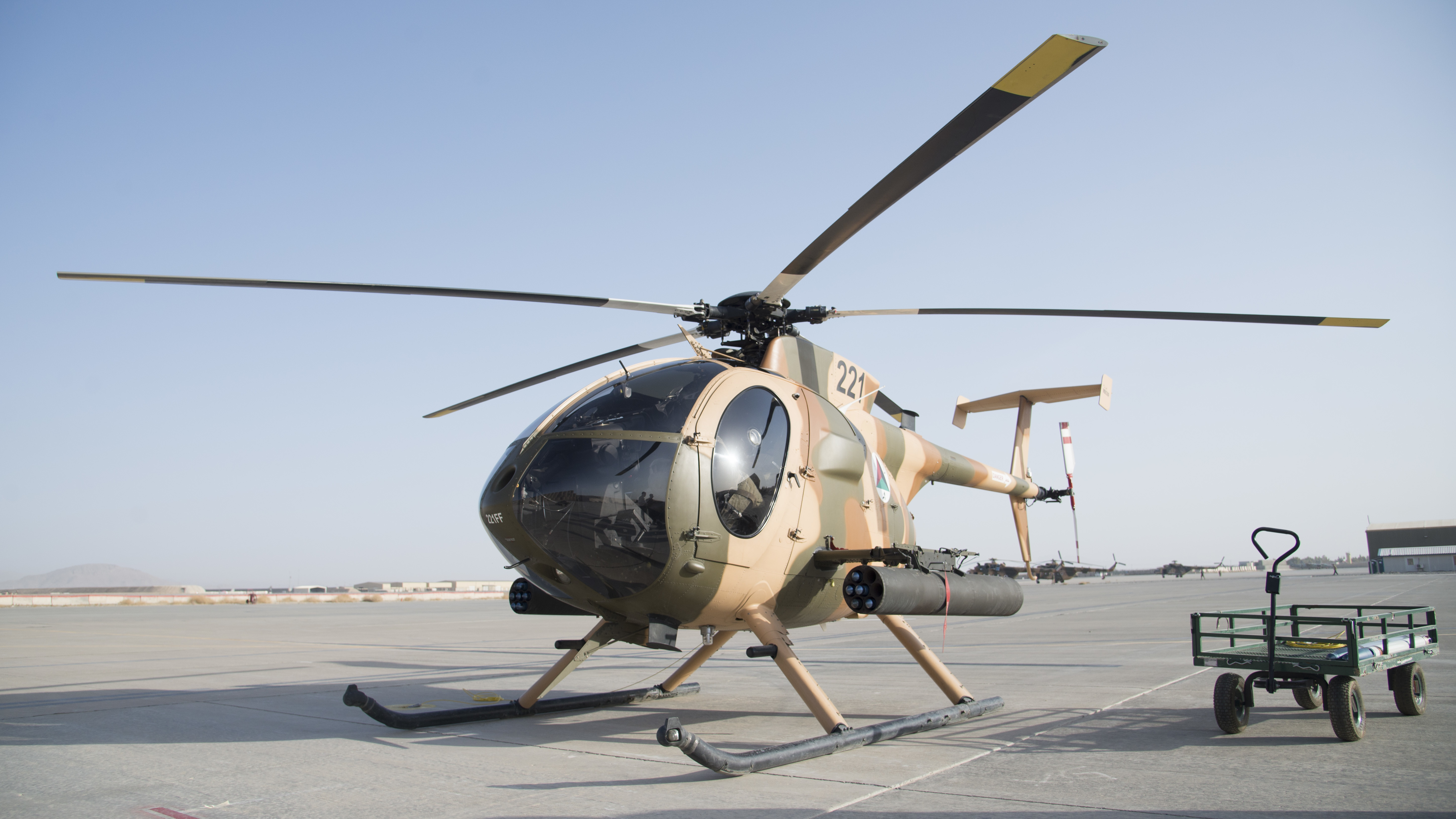
MD-530F Cayuse Warrior

MD 530F Cayuse Warrior
It is a military light scout attack helicopter developed from OH-6 Cayuse. It incorporated a simple fixed-forward sighting system, FN Herstal weapons management system, Rohde & Schwarz M3AR tactical mission radio and Dillon Aero mission configurable armament system (MCAS) weapons plank.
Performance: Service ceiling 16,000 feet (4,900 m), range 235 nautical miles (435 km), cruising speed 135 nautical miles (250 km) per hour.
Weapons: Two hardpoints for FN HMP400 gun pod with FN M3P .50 BMG (12.7 mm) heavy machine gun (1100 rpm firing rate, carries 400 rounds ammo, effective firing range nearly 1,850 m, maximum firing range 6500 m) and/or M260 rocket pod with 7 unguided Hydra 70 rockets (effective firing range 8 km).
Afghanistan Air Force is the largest operator of MD 530F Cayuse Warrior.
MD 530M
Military version.
MD 530MG Defender
Military version.
MD530 Nightfox
Night attack version.
MD530MG Paramilitary Defender
Police or border patrol version.
MD540F
Upgraded MD530F, incorporating a 6-bladed, fully articulated rotor blade system made of composite material, a more rugged landing skid for heavier take-off and landing weights, a fully integrated digital glass cockpit with multi-function color displays and a pilot Helmet Display and Tracking System (HDTS), which couples together a targeting FLIR and laser designator.
MD530G
Designed based on the MD530F airframe and is engineered with advanced technology to deliver enhanced combat capabilities.
MD 530G BII
Improved military version

== Operators ==
For civilian operators, see MD 500 series.

=== Military operators ===
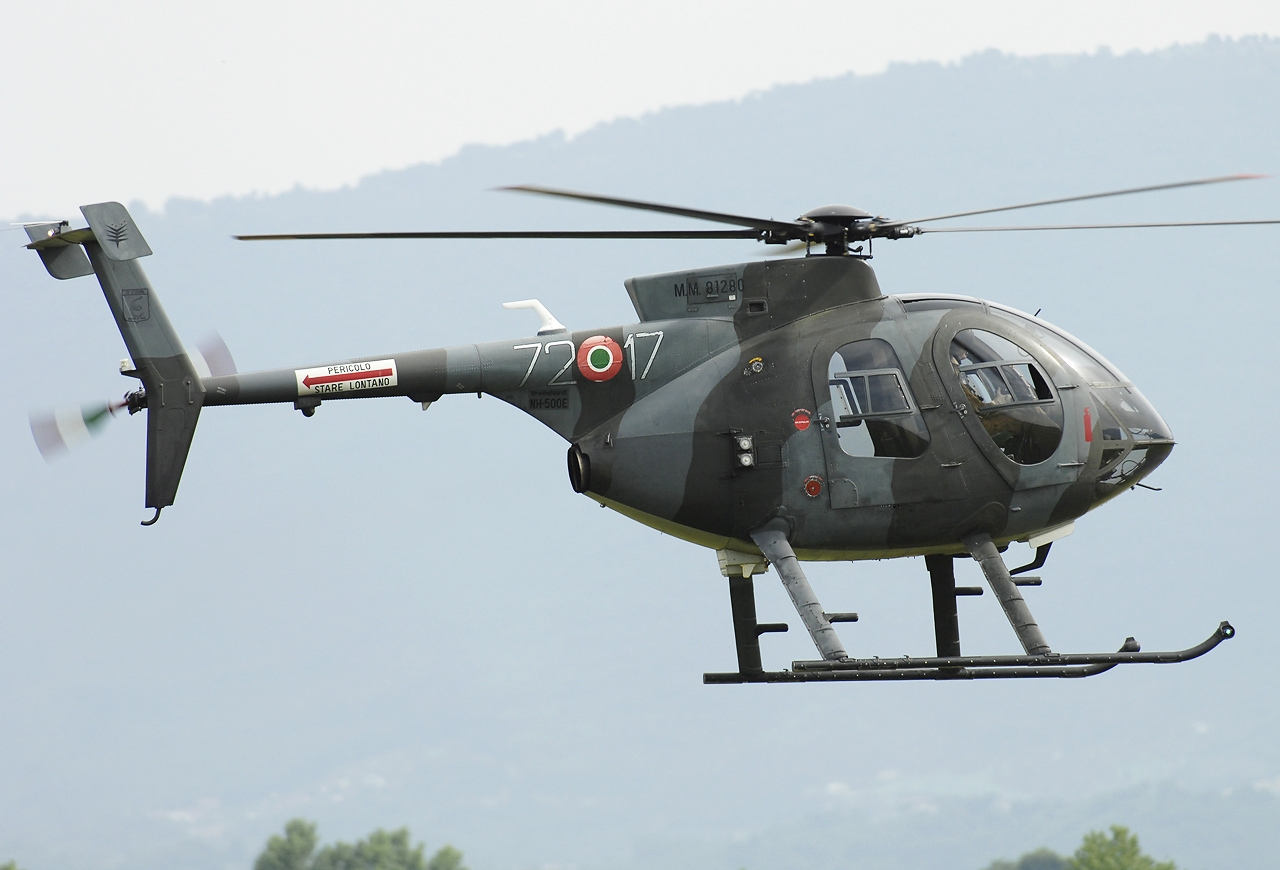
An Italian Air Force NH-500E

Argentina

- Argentine Air Force

Chile

- Chilean Army

Colombia

- Colombian Aerospace Force

El Salvador

- Salvadoran Air Force

Finland

- Finnish Army

Italy

- Italian Air Force

Japan
See Hughes OH-6
Kenya

- Kenya Defence Forces

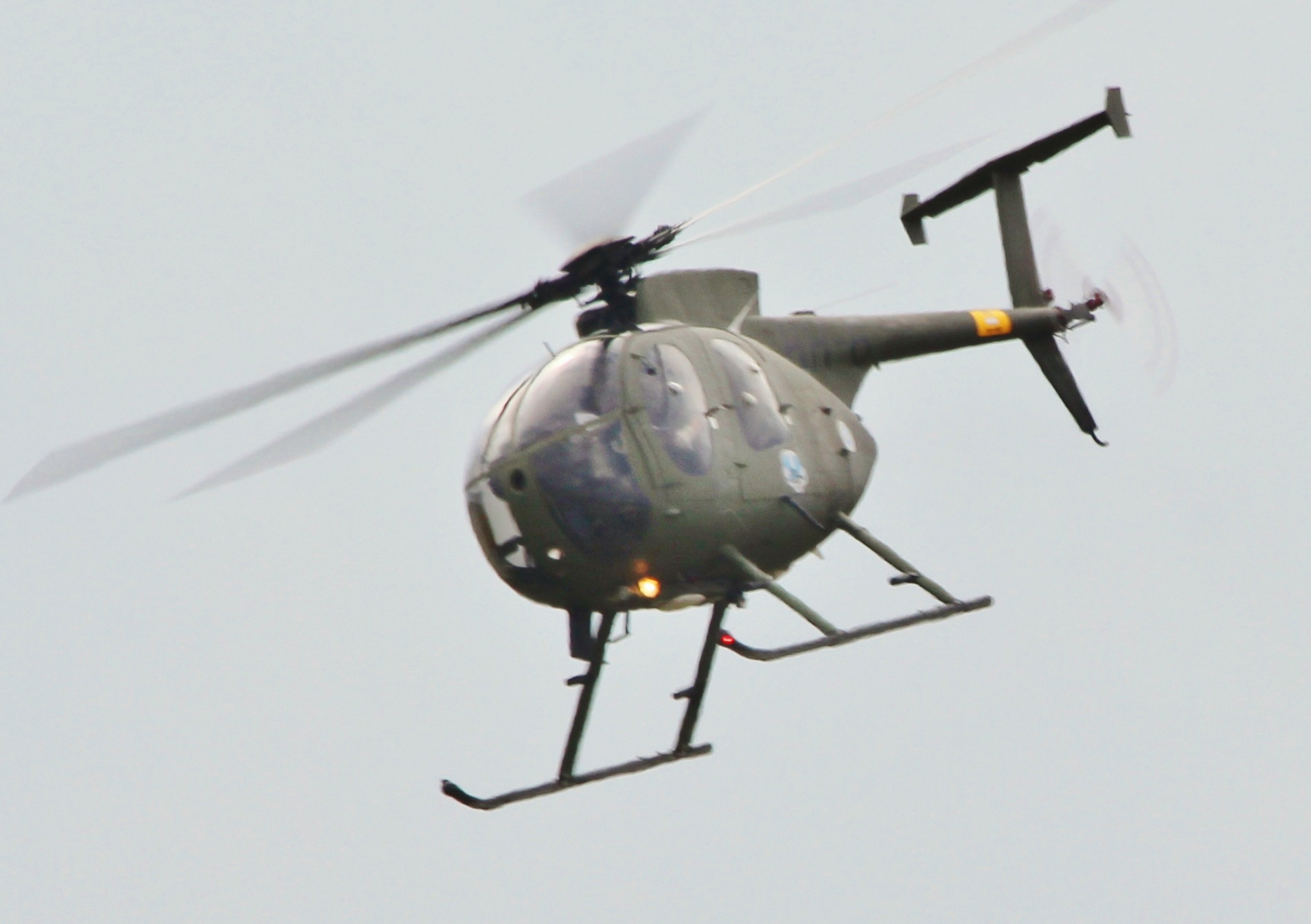
A MD500D of the Finnish Army

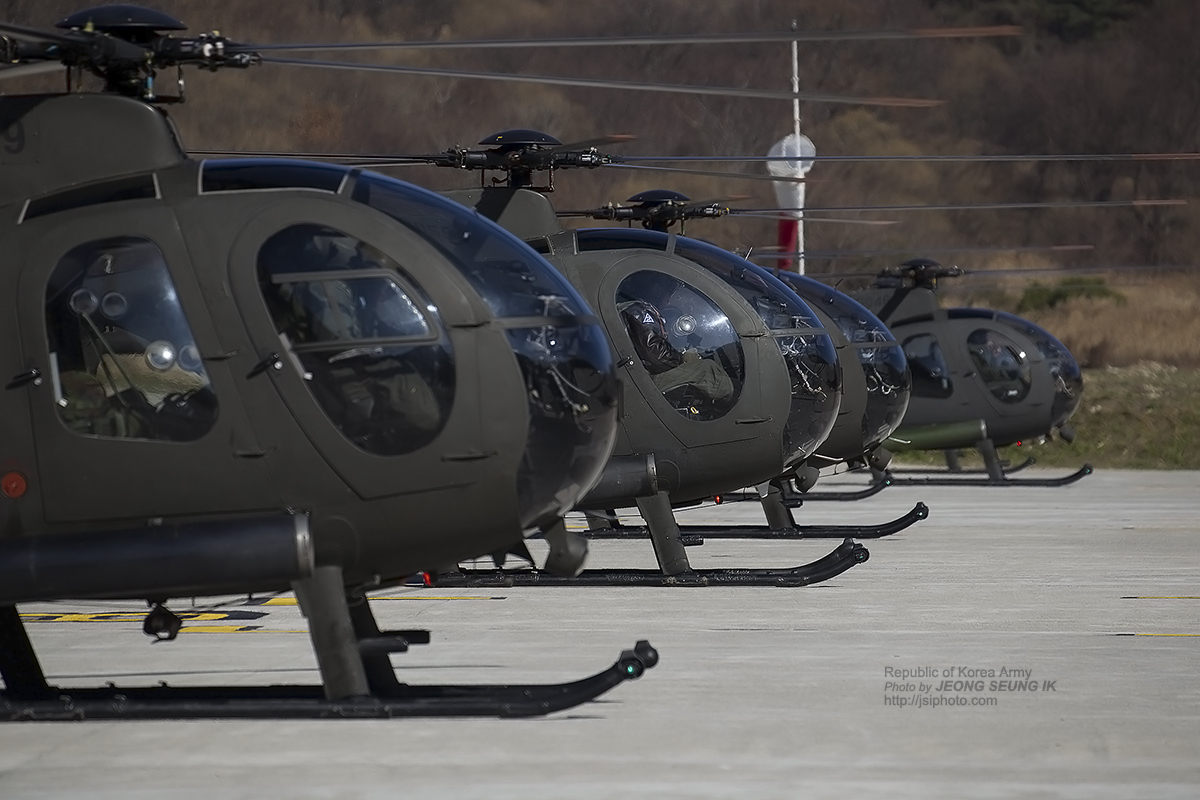
MD 500 Defenders in Korea

South Korea

- Republic of Korea Air Force
- Republic of Korea Army

Lebanon

- Lebanese Air Force

Malaysia

- Malaysian Army - Malaysian Army Aviation

Malta

- Maltese Air Wing. Retired as of 2026.

Mexico

- Mexican Air Force

Panama

- Servicio Nacional Aeronaval

Philippines

- Philippine Air Force - 24 units active in 2024 out of 32 units MD 520MG delivered in 1990.

Taiwan (Republic of China)

- Republic of China Naval Aviation Command

United States

- United States Army Aviation (See A/MH-6)

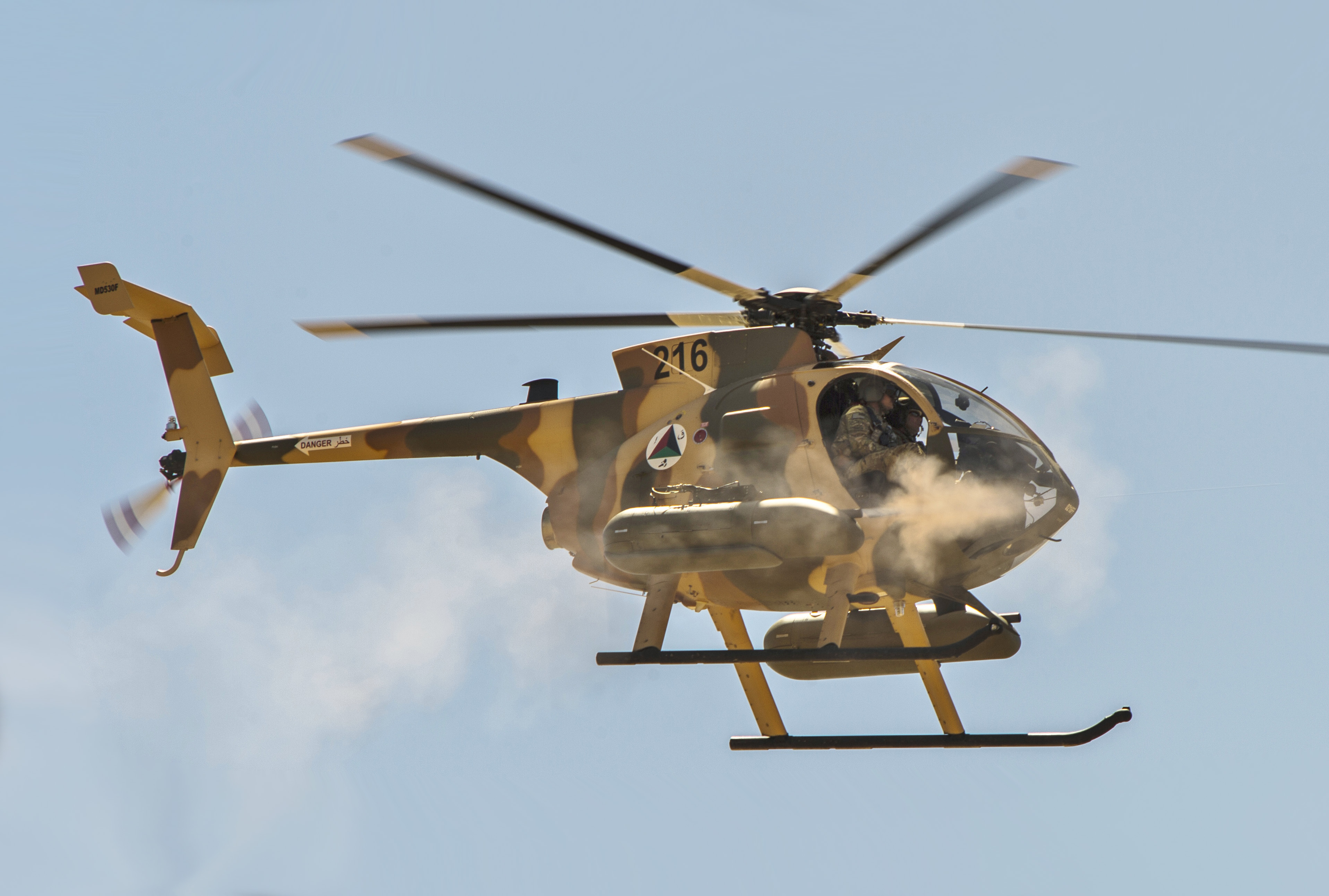
A former Afghan MD 530F firing off its gun pods

=== Former operators ===
Afghanistan

- Afghan Air Force

Argentina

- Argentine Coast Guard

Croatia

- Croatian Air Force

Guinea

- Guinean Air Force

Israel

- Israeli Air Force

== Specifications (500M) ==

Data from Jane's All the World's Aircraft 1981-82

General characteristics

- Crew: 2
- Length: 30 ft 9.5 in (9.385 m) rotors running
- Height: 8 ft 8.5 in (2.654 m) to top of rotor hub

8 ft 10.75 in (2.71 m) to top of tail fin

- Empty weight: 1,512 lb (686 kg)
- Max takeoff weight: 2,550 lb (1,157 kg) normal MTOW

3,000 lb (1,361 kg) overload MTOW

- Powerplant: 1 × Allison Model 250-C20B turboshaft engine, 420 shp (310 kW)
- Main rotor diameter: 26 ft 4.75 in (8.0455 m)

Performance

- Maximum speed: 132 kn (152 mph, 244 km/h) at 1,000 ft (300 m)
- Cruise speed: 117 kn (135 mph, 217 km/h) at sea level
- Range: 318 nmi (366 mi, 589 km) at 4,000 ft (1,200 m)
- Service ceiling: 4,390 ft (1,340 m)
- Hover ceiling IGE: 8,200 ft (2,500 m)
- Hover ceiling OGE: 5,300 ft (1,600 m)
- Rate of climb: 1,700 ft/min (8.6 m/s)

Armament

- four TOW anti-tank missiles, or
- two 7.62mm General Electric M134 Miniguns plus ammunition, or
- four General Dynamics Stinger air-to-air missile, or
- Mk 44 or Mk 46 lightweight torpedoes (ASW Version), or
- two seven-shot rocket pods

== See also ==
Related development

- Boeing AH-6
- Hughes OH-6 Cayuse
- MD Helicopters MD 500
- MD Helicopters MH-6 Little Bird

Aircraft of comparable role, configuration, and era

- Aérospatiale Gazelle AH.1/SA 341F/SA 342M – (France)
- MBB Bo 105P PAH – (West Germany)
