= René Mouawad Airport =

René Mouawad International Airport مطار الرئيس الشهيد رينيه معوض Maṭār ar-Raʾīs aš-Šahīd Rinih Muʿawwad
- IATA: KYE; ICAO: OLKA

Summary
- Airport type: Military / public
- Operator: Lebanese Armed Forces
- Serves: Northern Lebanon (Tripoli region)
- Location: Qlayaat, Akkar District, Akkar Governorate, Lebanon
- Opened: 1934
- Elevation AMSL: 23 ft (7.0 m)
- Coordinates: 34°35′22″N 36°00′41″E

Map
- Location within Lebanon

Runways
Direction	Length		Surface
Direction	ft	m	Surface
06/24	9,843	3,000	Concrete

René Mouawad Airport (Arabic: مطار الرئيس الشهيد رينيه معوض, romanized: Maṭār ar-Raʾīs aš-Šahīd Rinih Muʿawwad), also known as Qlayaat Airport or Kleyate Airport (Arabic: مطار القليعات), is a joint civil–military airport in the town of Qlayaat, Akkar District, Northern Lebanon, located approximately 6 kilometres (3.7 mi) from the Lebanon–Syria border.

The facility is operated by the Lebanese Armed Forces as René Mouawad Air Base. As of 2026, it is being rehabilitated for the resumption of civilian operations alongside its continued military use.

== History ==
=== Early history ===
Qlayaat airport originally began as a small private airstrip constructed in 1934 by the Iraq Petroleum Company, which it used to transport its employees and technicians between Lebanon and other Arab countries with the help of its fleet of small aircraft. The location was chosen because of its strategic location in the flat coastal plain of Akkar in Northern Lebanon as well as to its close proximity to the railway line connecting Lebanon to Syria and Iraq via railway.

In 1938, the French mandate authorities of Greater Lebanon, recognized the strategic value of Qlayaat airstrip, and with the help of the French Army took control of it and began converting it into a military airfield in order to suit their needs at the time.

=== World War II period ===
In late June 1940, Qlayaat military airfield, like the rest of French mandate Lebanon and Syria airfields, fell under the control of the Vichy regime, a puppet state created and controlled by Nazi Germany after the fall of France.

Because of Qlayaat airfield's strategic military location, Vichy France began using it in order to serve its military needs. They stationed their air force in it in order to stop any allied advance into the region. They used Qlayaat airbase mostly in a defensive manner rather than launching provocative attacks against the Allies.

In 1941, Great Britain learned that Nazi Germany was using Vichy France air bases in the Levant to refuel, causing a major alarm that Nazi Germany could potentially attack the Suez canal and sever Great Britain access to much of its empire. This spurred Great Britain, along with its allies, to recapture Lebanon and Syria from Vichy France in Operation Exporter in the Syria–Lebanon campaign. Once the Allies captured Qlayaat military airfield, they began using it for their military needs.

After World War II, Qlayaat airfield was again reactivated for civilian use and returned to the Iraq Petroleum Company to operate and use.

=== After Lebanese independence ===
When Lebanon declared independence from France, it inherited Qlayaat airfield from the French mandate authorities along with four other airfields. During the early 1960s, Qlayaat airfield was still being used for civilian purposes, mainly by the Iraq Petroleum Company to transport its employees, engineers and other technicians between Lebanon and other Arab countries using small aircraft.

In 1966, the Lebanese Army took control of Qlayaat airfield, and began the process of expanding and modernizing it into a joint civil-military airport installation, in order to house the modern French-supplied Dassault Mirage III fighter jets, as well as the training of pilots and technicians accordingly. At the time, Qlayaat airport was the most advanced airbase in the region. A contract was signed between Lebanon and France for the Lebanese Air Force to acquire modern Dassault Mirage III fighter jets as well as for Lebanese pilots and technicians to undergo training in France.

At the beginning of 1968, Lebanese pilots and technicians began returning from France to Lebanon, and later were stationed at Qlayaat airbase, pending the arrival of the modern Dassault Mirage III fighter jets from France. The first two Dassault Mirage III fighter jets landed in Qlayaat air base in April of the same year, flown by two Lebanese pilots. The delivery of the other Dassault Mirage III fighter jets followed in a non-stop air flights from France to Qlayaat airbase. All deliveries of Dassault Mirage III had been completed by June 1969. The Dassault Mirage III fighter jets performed outstanding air activities and executed numerous missions. Their flight readiness rate was very high due to the elevated capacities of its Lebanese pilots and technician teams.

In the mid-1980s, the Lebanese Air Force was reported to have ten French-made Dassault Mirage III fighter-bombers, of which only three were in commission.

=== Lebanese Civil War ===
During the Lebanese Civil War, military activity at Qlayaat air base significantly declined, and due to the precarious economic situation generated by the war, the Dassault Mirage III fighter jets were placed in storage from 1978 onward.

However, Qlayaat airport's role as a civilian airport intensified during the last two years of the Lebanese Civil War, between 1988 and 1990, due to most of the roads leading in and out of Beirut and to other parts of the country being closed or blockaded by Lebanese militias, which led Middle East Airlines, Lebanon's national carrier, to offer flights between Beirut airport and Qlayaat airport, to connect Beirut to Northern Lebanon.

A pivotal historic moment for Lebanon came on November 5, 1989 when the Lebanese Parliament convened on the grounds of Qlayaat airbase in order to ratify the Taif Agreement to endorse urgent political reforms, which resulted in the election of Hussein al-Husseini as speaker of Lebanese parliament, and René Moawad as president of Lebanon. However, 17 days later, after Moawad's election as president of Lebanon, he was killed in an assassination by a car bomb in Beirut, planted by unknown assailants. This prompted the Lebanese government to rename Qlayaat airport to René Mouawad International Airport in his memory.

Later, the airport was handed down to the Lebanese Air Force, in order to symbolise national sovereignty assertions against factional divisions.

Because of the high maintenance cost, and the worsening of the economy due to the Lebanese Civil War, the Mirage 3 flew with the Lebanese Air Force until 1978, and then was grounded. After a long period in storage, they were sold to Pakistan in 2000.

=== 2006 war and aftermath ===
On 13 July 2006, the airport was bombed by the Israeli Air Force during the 2006 Lebanon War. It was repaired and continued operating as a Lebanese Air Force installation.

As of the early 2010s, Aérospatiale SA 330 Puma helicopters were stationed at the base.

== Redevelopment and reopening ==
Plans to expand the airport's civilian role have existed since the late 2000s. In 2010, the director general of civil aviation, Hamdi Chaouk, announced plans to develop the airport for cargo operations and low-cost carriers serving northern Lebanon. In January 2012, the Lebanese cabinet approved plans to restore the airport for cargo and low-cost airline operations, although implementation was subsequently delayed.

Reopening of the long dormant Rene Mouawad airport for civilian use would help stimulate the economy of the Akkar region in Northern Lebanon, which has been neglected for years by the Lebanese government, and would create around 5,000 jobs. The reopening of the airport would also reduce reliance on Beirut Airport, currently Lebanon's sole international aerial gateway.

On 16 February 2025, after disruptions affecting Beirut–Rafic Hariri International Airport, Minister of Public Works and Transport Fayez Rasamny stated that Lebanon required a second operational airport, and indicated that plans to rehabilitate Qlayaat airport would advance. On 25 March 2025, Prime Minister Nawaf Salam announced during a visit to the airport that it would become operational for civilian flights within a year. On 11 November 2025, MEA chairman Mohamad El Hout announced plans for a low-cost subsidiary, Fly Beirut, which would be based at René Mouawad Airport and commence operations in 2027 with a fleet of six aircraft.

On 19 May 2026, Sky Lounge Services won the bid to relaunch the airport. On 6 June 2026, Rasamny officially launched the rehabilitation project for the airport and announced that civilian operations were expected to begin within weeks. Initial destinations were reported to include Istanbul, Mersin, and Dubai. According to estimates announced at the launch ceremony, the airport was expected to handle approximately 114,000 passengers during its first year of operation, and more than 600,000 annually by its fourth year. Restarting Qlayaat airport as a civilian airport aims to stimulate Northern Lebanon's economy.

On 10 June 2026, Mada Airways, a new local Lebanese airline, was created, since Middle East Airlines (MEA) was granted its monopoly in 1969 is ready to launch itself and plans to operate exclusively from Qlayaat–Rene Moawad Airport after its rehabilitation rather than from Beirut Airport.

The firts commercial flight is scheduled for November 15, with Cairo, Egypt

First Commercial flights from Qleyaat Airport are now expected to start on December 14 to coincide with the winter holiday instead of Lebanon independence day on November 22

Mada Airways stated on the 18 of November that it will open bookings on December first for commercial flights Qleyaat Airport to Cairo, Istanbul and Amman, pending final approvals

== See also ==
- Beirut–Rafic Hariri International Airport
- Rayak Air Base
- Lebanese Air Force
- List of airports in Lebanon
