= Jabbour Airfield =

Military airport in Lebanon

- Birket Jabbour in Lebanon

Site information
- Type: Military and civil airfield
- Operator: Hezbollah
- Condition: Non-operational

Location
- Shown within Lebanon
- Coordinates: 33°28′31″N 35°36′38″E

Site history
- Built: 2022

Airfield information
Runways
| Direction | Length and surface |
|---|---|
| 04/22 | 1,215 metres (3,986 ft) Asphalt |

Jabbour Airfield is a military airstrip located in Birket Jabbour, Lebanon. In September 2023, it became a topic of media controversy, being accused of having built by Hezbollah and Iran in a collaborative effort. It began construction between October-November 2022 and was completed by August.

== History ==
From 1982 to 2000, the site was occupied by Israel and designated as a military zone.

In 2006, Hezbollah began the seizure of private land in Birket Jabbour, most of which was owned by the Catholic Church of Lebanon. Following this, the land was restricted from civilian access, and was declared a military region. Afterwards, the construction of a military complex in Qalaat Jabbour began under the supervision of Hezbollah military commander Imad Mughniyeh. It housed a barracks and a training center operated by hezbollah.

Construction

Jabbour Airfield began construction in the complex between October-November 2022, and the asphalt runway was laid by July 2023. It was built near the artificial lake of Qalaat Jabbour. Work on paving the runway, installing a helipad, and aviation markings on the runway was completed by late August. It was reported to be used for unmanned aerial vehicle operations to carry out reconnaissance and attack missions.

On 21 May 2023, Hezbollah conducted a military exercises near the village of Aaramta, located approximately 2 kilometers from the airfield. As part of the exercise, journalists and the public were invited to enter the region, however under Hezbollah’s supervision. On 11 September, Israeli Defense Minister Yoav Gallant accused Iran’s Islamic Revolutionary Guard Corps for making a collaboration with Hezbollah to construct the airstrip in facilitation of attack missions against Israel.

=== Attacks ===
On 24 January, 2024, the Israel Defense Forces announced that Israeli aircraft airstruck the airfield and nearby military buildings. This mission rendered the airfield non-operational, leaving the site with several craters. On 28 March, 2025 at 11:49 am, a second Israeli airstrike struck the site.
