= Marjayoun Airfield =

Defunct airfield in Southern Lebanon

- Marjeyoun District, in Lebanon
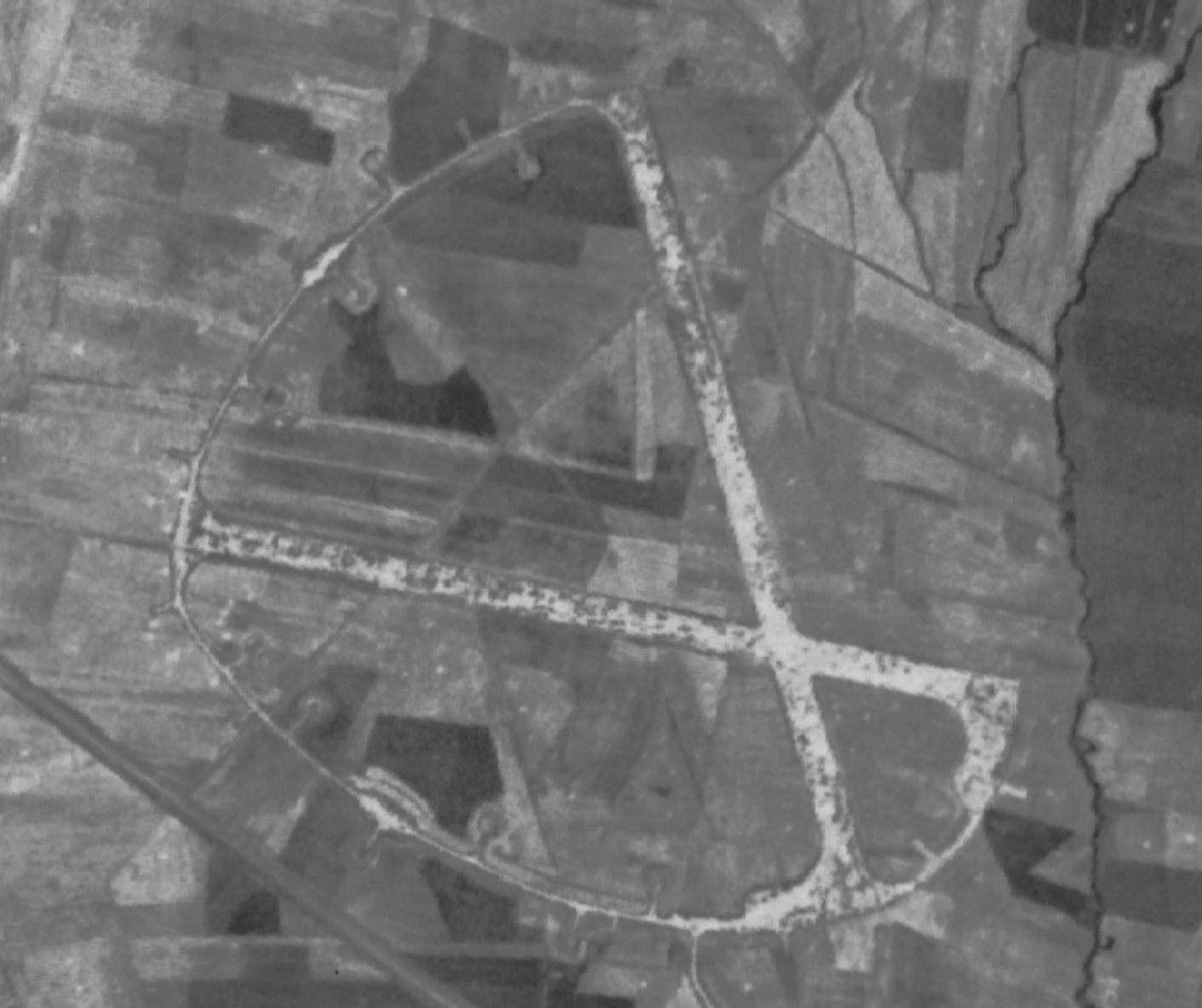
- Marjayoun Airfield between 1960-72 in an abandoned state.

Location
- Shown within Lebanon
- Coordinates: 33°17′41″N 35°34′30″E

Site history
- Built: 1942
- Built by: British Army
- In use: c1945 - 1949
- Fate: Demolished

Airfield information
Runways
Direction	Length and surface
NW/SE	1,825 metres (5,988 ft) Asphalt
E/W	1,000 metres (3,281 ft) Asphalt

Marjayoun Airfield, also known as Al-Marj Airfield, Khiam Airfield or English Airfield, was a British airport which was constructed during World War II. It is located 10 kilometres (6.2 mi) south of Metula, in the Marjeyoun District, Nabatieh Governorate in Southern Lebanon.

== History ==
In the late 1930s, a French plane crashed in the region, marking the first aerial history in the Marjeyoun District. The crash was in the same area where the airfield was planned to be built. The area was a major battleground where the Allied forces confronted the German army. It served as a major defensive position, especially if Egypt were to fall to the Germans or if they managed to advance to Palestine, Lebanon, and Syria. Consequently, the British army began construction defensive fortifications in the plains. It was also considered strategic to construct an airfield in the region.

=== Military infrastructure project ===
In 1942, construction of a road network to connect the future airfield to other villages commenced, with a daily wage of 1.5 lira for every worker. Hundreds of Lebanese workers from neighboring villages were employed and transported by British army trucks to Al-Marj and the surrounding areas. Constructing hangars, internal roads, and runways were done by camels transporting stone from nearby quarries in the Sarda area and Tall al-Nuhas. Afterwards, military posts were built to the east and west, accompanied by trenches, tunnels, and stone barriers set on concrete blocks to prevent enemy armored vehicles from intruding. In the entrance of the town of Khiam, a field hospital was constructed. All of this was facilitated under Allied supervision, and the final phase of the project was the construction of Marjayoun Airfield.

=== Construction ===
In 1942, construction of Marjayoun Airfield commenced in a site owned by the Jewish Colonization Association. It was surrounded by the Tell el-Nahas, Tell el-Hamamis, Tell Dibbin, and Riyaq hills. 200 workers were employed daily, and construction took 3 years, eventually completing in c1945 with 9 aircraft hangars. Each aircraft hangar consisted of three walls measuring 3-meters high, with each shelter covering approximately 500 square meters. Marjayoun Airfield also included several control towers, a command room, and was surrounded by fortifications and trenches built by the British Army with the purpose of protecting its facilities and aircraft. According to Engineer Jalal Abdullah who collected oral history from the area, the airfield was designed by a German officer who had defected from the army, and the layout was constructed in the form of a swastika symbol in an act of provocation against the Allies.

Usage

Marjayoun Airfield was only operational for 5 years. Due to the airfield’s narrow terrain, multiple crash incidents during landing have occurred through its operational years.

== Post-use ==
After abandonment, the land was handed to Lebanon. It was leased to local farmers through public auction, which was used to cultivate grains. In 1978, Israel occupied a southern portion of the airfield, making it unfit for civilian operations. After Israeli withdrawal in 2000, occupying forces allegedly stole thousands of cubic meters of soil, leaving trenches and unusable paths. However, the airport’s close proximity to Israel’s airspace furthermore makes it difficult for future operations.

=== Present ===
Today, remnants of the airfield still exist in agricultural land farmed by local residents. The land is under state lease of $15 via district administration. Only eight aircraft hangars still remain, being currently used as livestock barns. According to satellite imagery, the outlines of runways and taxiways are still recognizable.
