= Lebanese Air Force =

Air warfare branch of Lebanon's military

- القوات الجوية اللبنانية; Al Quwwat al-Jawwiya al-Lubnaniyya
- Emblem of the Lebanese Air Force
- Founded: 1 June 1949; 77 years ago
- Country: Lebanon
- Type: Air force
- Role: Aerial warfare
- Size: 2,500 active personnel; 81 active aircraft; 16 UAV Systems
- Part of: Lebanese Armed Forces
- Mottos: "Here I am, Lebanon's sky"
- Anniversaries: 1 August
- Engagements: 1958 Lebanon crisis; Six-Day War; Lebanese Civil War; Operation Dinnieh; Global War on Terrorism (2001- Present); Nahr al-Bared; Syrian Civil War spillover in Lebanon • Battle of Sidon • Battle of Arsal • Operation Dawn of the Outskirts
- Website: Official website

Commanders
- Current commander: Major General Ziad Haykal

Insignia
- Roundel

- Fin flash

- Flag

Aircraft flown
- Attack: Cessna 208, Embraer EMB 314
- Helicopter: Huey II, AB212, MD530F+, IAR 330SM, Gazelle SA342L, AW139
- Reconnaissance: Raven RQ-11B, ScanEagle
- Trainer: Robinson R44, Scottish Aviation Bulldog

The Lebanese Air Force (LAF) (Arabic: القوات الجوية اللبنانية, romanized: Al Quwwat al-Jawwiya al-Lubnaniyya) is the aerial warfare branch of the Lebanese Armed Forces.

== History ==
The Lebanese Air Force were established in 1949 under the command of then-Lieutenant Colonel Emile Boustany, who later became commander of the army. Soon after its establishment, a number of aircraft were donated by the British, French, and Italian governments. Britain donated 4 Percival Prentices and 2 World War II-era Percival Proctors, while Italy donated 4 Savoia-Marchetti SM.79 bombers which were mainly used for transportation.

In 1953, jet fighters were introduced when 16 de Havilland Vampire jets were received. The first Hawker Hunters arrived in 1959 and were followed by additional fighters through 1977. In 1968, 12 Mirage IIIELs were delivered from France but were grounded in the late 1970s due to lack of funds. In 2000, the grounded Mirages were sold to Pakistan.

In 2018, the United States government delivered six Embraer EMB 314 Super Tucano to the Lebanese Air Force.

In the absence of advanced fighter aircraft, the air force currently relies on a helicopter force, a squadron of Embraer EMB 314 Super Tucano, and three Cessna AC 208s for the reconnaissance and ground attack roles.

In October 2018, MD Helicopters confirmed receipt of a delivery order of six MD 530F+ for Lebanese air force with estimated delivery scheduled for the fourth quarter of 2020.

=== Combat history ===
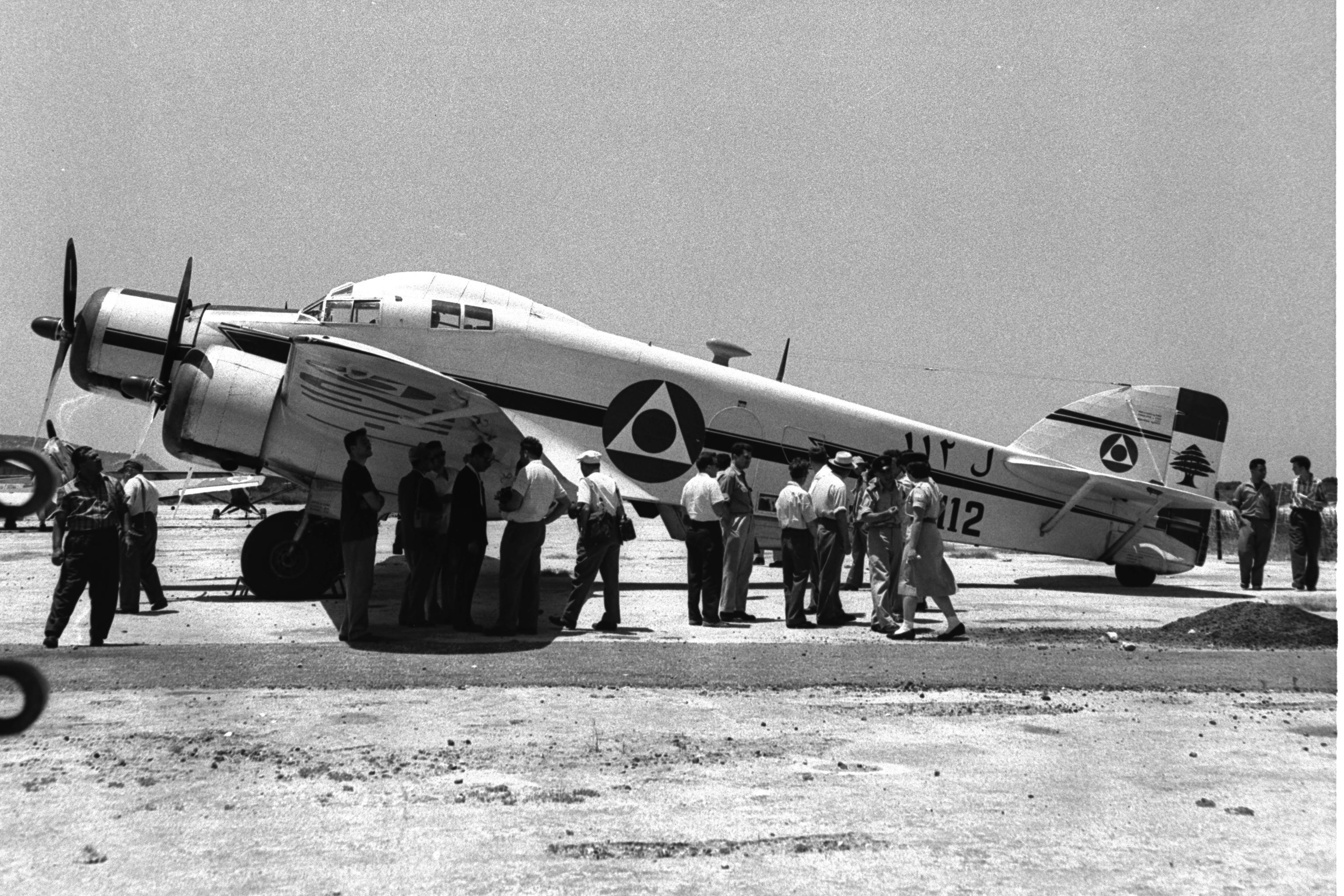
Savoia Marchetti SM.79.

The Lebanese Air Forces have a long history operating Hawker Hunter jets since 1958. During the Six-Day War Two Hawker Hunter strafed Israeli positions in Galilee. One Lebanese Hawker Hunter was shot down by an Israeli Air Force Mirage IIICJ. This ended the short Lebanese involvement in the air war. The Hawker Hunters have not flown any combat sorties since September 17, 1983. This was at a time when the French and Americans were rebuilding the Lebanese Army. Three F.Mk.70s were made airworthy and resumed combat operations on September 15. Because the main airfield, Rayak Air Base, had been shelled by Syrian forces, the Hunters had to operate from an airfield in Byblos. The Hunters were finally grounded in 1994 after a minor accident with one of the T.66 trainers during landing and the remaining 8 were stored in Rayak. The last loss took place in 1989 near Batroun during routine training, when the undercarriage failed to lower, causing the jet to crash. The pilot ejected safely from the doomed aircraft and landed in the Mediterranean sea, where he was promptly rescued by the Syrian Army, which then handed him over to Suleiman Frangieh, who in turn handed him over to the Lebanese Army at the al-Madfoun crossing.

During operations in the Nahr el-Bared camp in North Lebanon, lacking any airworthy, fixed-wing strike aircraft, the Lebanese Army modified several UH-1H Huey helicopters to permit the carrying of 500 pound Mark 82 and 1000 pound Mark 83 bombs (all unguided iron bombs, also known as dumb bombs) as well as Matra SNEB 68 mm rocket pods (taken from stored Hawker Hunters). Special mounting pads engineered by the Lebanese Army were attached to each Huey on the sides and belly to carry the bombs. The air force, in collaboration with the engineering regiment, developed and used two dumb bomb variants, the 250 kg LAF-GS-ER2 and the 400 kg LAF-GS-ER3. The Lebanese Army also made extensive use of Aérospatiale Gazelles armed with Euromissile HOT anti-tank guided missiles and machine gun pods.

The Lebanese air force played a decisive role throughout the Syrian Civil War spillover in Lebanon, conducting surveillance operations and precision attacks against Al-Nusra Front and Islamic State of Iraq and the Levant who had invaded the border town of Arsal in 2014 and subsequently kept positions along the outskirts of Arsal and al-Qaa, preventing any further advances.

== Squadrons and air bases ==
Squadron	Airbase	Aircraft
1st squadron	Beirut–Rafic Hariri International Airport.	Scottish Aviation Bulldog T.1
4th Squadron	Beirut–Rafic Hariri International Airport	AC-208B Combat Caravan
7th Squadron	Wujah Al Hajar Air Base (Hamat)	Embraer A-29B
8th Squadron	Rayak Air Base	Aerospastiale SA-342L Gazelle
9th Squadron	Wujah Al Hajar Air Base (Hamat)	MD530F Defender
12th Squadron	Beirut–Rafic Hariri International Airport	UH-1H-II
14th Squadron	Rene Mouawad Air Base (Kleyate)	SA 330 Puma
15th Squadron	Rayak Air Base	Robinson Raven R44 II and UH-1H
Presidential Flight	Beirut–Rafic Hariri International Airport	Agusta Westland AW139

== Equipment ==
=== Current equipment ===
Aircraft	Origin	Type	Variant	In service	Photos	Notes
Combat aircraft
Cessna 208	United States	attack / CAS	AC-208	3		3 AC-208Bs delivered by United States in 2009, 2013 and 2017 respectively. Modified to carry AGM-114 missiles
Embraer EMB 314	Brazil	attack / COIN	A-29B	5		6 ordered in November 2015. Deliveries were completed by 2018 and one crashed in 2023.and the aircraft are armed with two 12.7 mm M3M machine guns, 70 mm Hydra rockets , and will be fitted with a BAE Systems APKWS (Advanced Precision Kill Weapon System) precision kit, an AN/AAR-60(V)2 missile defense system and an AN/ALE-47 countermeasures dispenser.
Helicopters
Bell UH-1	United States	Utility	UH-1H	9		Originally 24; 3 had crashed, with 12 more being retired. Currently being phased out in favor of the Huey II.
Huey II	United States	Utility		14		Delivered by United States. 6 in January 2012,3 in march 2016,3,in Jan 2021 and 3 more in Dec 2022. Previously 15; one crashed in 2023.
AB212	Italy	Utility		5		• The Lebanese Armed Forces grounded and stored their AB-212 fleet in 1990 due to financial and operational constraints. • Revival Plan: In January 2020, the military launched a 5-year initiative to locally refurbish and restore five AB-212 helicopters to service. • Cost Efficiency: Using in-house technical expertise from their Huey II program and spare parts, technicians cut refurbishment costs by roughly 60% despite severe economic crises.
IAR 330	Romania	Utility / transport	IAR 330SM ex United Arab Emirates Air Force	7		Donated by United Arab Emirates Air Force surplus stock in 2010.
MD500 Defender	United States	light attack	MD530F+	5		6 MD 530Fs ordered in October 2018, delivered on 6 October 2021. They will be equipped with a 6x9 inch Genesys LCD display, a more advanced and high-performance mission system, which projects data on displays on the sides of the cockpit, the integrated Thales SCORPION helmet, an L3 Wescam MX-10 electro-optical turret, plus a multi-channel communication system with advanced encryption.One example was lost in an accident in January 2022.
Aérospatiale SA342	France	Light utility,Anti-armor / Scout	SA342L equiped with hot missiles.	7		9 Donated by United Arab Emirates Air Force surplus stock in 2007. Approximately 7 operational aircraft in service.
AgustaWestland AW139	Italy	VIP transport		1		1 AW139 for VIP transport donated by Qatar in 2008.Presidential transport.
Trainer aircraft
Bulldog 126	United Kingdom	basic trainer	T.1 (in service since 1975)	3		
Robinson R44	United States	Rotorcraft trainer		6		.• 2005 Batch: The military took delivery of its first two R44 helicopters in January 2005. Later that year, in December 2005, they added two more to bring the training fleet to four aircraft. • 2014 Batch: The fleet was expanded further when the Air Force signed a contract with the Robinson Helicopter Company to acquire an additional two R44 Raven II models, bringing the total lifetime inventory to six.
UAV
RQ-11 Raven	United States	surveillance	Hand-launched UAV	15		Previously 18. 12 RQ-11 received in 2009, with six more being received from the Foreign Military Sales program between 2014 and 2020. Three crashed in 2016.
Scan Eagle	United States	surveillance	Sensors: * EO950/MWIR * 775EO Camera with ViDAR (maritime surveillance) - TBD	5		6 delivered by United States in April 2019, one crashed in 2025.

=== Simulators ===
- UH-1H Flight Simulator

=== Former aircraft ===
The Lebanese Air Force has operated a variety of aircraft over the years, ranging from training aircraft to fighter jets and helicopters. These aircraft were retired during the Lebanese Civil War; the Lebanese military would officially ground planes at some point, now only using them in a limited capacity.

Aircraft	Origin	Retired	Photos	Notes
Fighters
Hawker Hunter	United Kingdom	2014		Re-entered service briefly between 2008 and 2010, after which it became inoperable. Two are stored in the Rayak airbase museum.
Dassault Mirage IIIEL	France	1978		Saw limited use as a ceremonial and training jet. Retired in 1978, and sold to Pakistan in 2000.
de Havilland Vampire	United Kingdom	Early 1970s		Progressively retired starting from the late 1960s, with the last two retired in the early 1970s. 1 still present at the Rayak Airbase museum.
Trainer aircraft
Fouga CM.170 Magister	France	Early 1990s		Jet trainer, bought in anticipation of further airfleet purchases in 1966 and 1972, 1 still present at the Rayak Airbase museum.
de Havilland Canada DHC-1	Canada	1974		1 still present at the Rayak Airbase museum .
T6 Texan	United States	1972		1 still present at the Rayak Airbase museum.
Macchi MB.308	Italy	1966		Aside from training, it was also used to fight the spread of malaria mosquitoes in the early 1950s.
Percival Prentice	United Kingdom	1952		Came with the same order than the Percival Proctor, though arrived a few days later.
Percival Proctor	United Kingdom			The first plane to fly under the cedar tree flag.
Bombers
Savoia-Marchetti SM.79	Italy	1959		4 were bought and meant to form a bombing squadron, in reality it was mostly used for transport and training. 1 was given to the Gianni Caproni Museum of Aeronautics in 1993.
Transport aircraft
de Havilland Dove	United Kingdom	Mid-1970s		Used as a navigation trainer, VIP transport, and as a photo-mapping plane. It was considered to re-introduce the plane in 1993, but that idea was ultimately scrapped. 1 still present at Rayak Airbase museum.
Dassault Falcon 20	France	Early 2000s		Used for presidential transport missions.
Helicopters
Sud Aviation Alouette III	France	Late 1980s		Two are displayed at the Rayak Airbase museum.
