= Beirut–Rafic Hariri International Airport =

Airport in Lebanon

Beirut-Rafic Hariri International Airport مطار رفيق الحريري الدولي بيروت French: Aéroport international de Beyrouth - Rafic Hariri

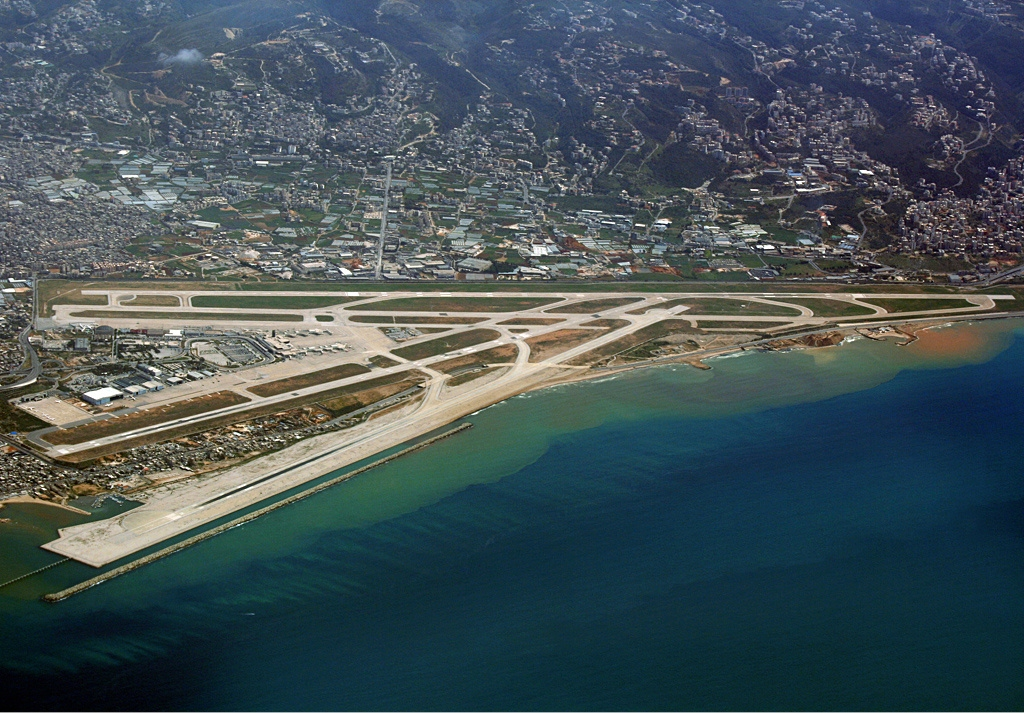
- IATA: BEY; ICAO: OLBA

Summary
- Airport type: Public
- Owner/Operator: Directorate General of Civil Aviation
- Serves: Beirut, Lebanon
- Hub for: Middle East Airlines
- Elevation AMSL: 27 m (89 ft)
- Coordinates: 33°49′16″N 035°29′18″E
- Website: www.beirutairport.gov.lb

Maps
- Location within Lebanon
- Interactive map of Beirut-Rafic Hariri; International Airport

Runways
Direction	Length		Surface
Direction	m	ft	Surface
03/21	3,800×45	12,467×148	Concrete
16/34	3,395×45	11,138×148	Concrete
17/35	3,250×45	10,663×148	Asphalt

Statistics (2025)
- Aircraft movements: ▲55,800
- Total passengers: ▲7,011,129

Beirut–Rafic Hariri International Airport (Arabic: مطار رفيق الحريري الدولي بيروت, French: Aéroport international de Beyrouth - Rafic Hariri, previously known as Beirut International Airport) (IATA: BEY, ICAO: OLBA) is the only operational commercial airport in Lebanon. It is located in the Southern Suburbs of Beirut, Lebanon, 9 kilometres (5.6 mi) from the city center. The airport is the hub for Lebanon's national carrier, Middle East Airlines (MEA) and was the hub for the Lebanese cargo carrier TMA cargo and Wings of Lebanon before their respective collapses.

The airport was named after former Lebanese prime minister Rafic Hariri in 2005, following his assassination earlier that year.

It is the main port of entry into the country along with the Port of Beirut. The airport is managed and operated by the Directorate General of Civil Aviation, which operates within the Ministry of Public Works and Transport. The directorate is also responsible for operating the air traffic control at the airport as well as controlling Lebanon's airspace. Its duties include maintenance and general upkeep ranging from cleaning the terminal to de-rubberising the runways.

== History ==
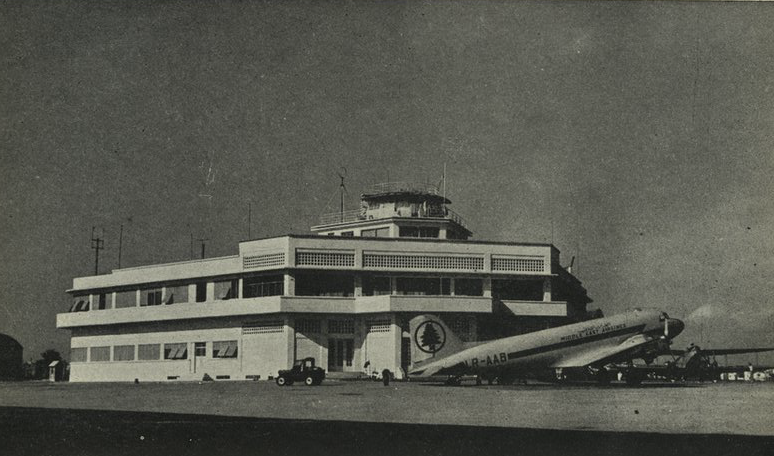
Beirut Airport in 1947

=== Early history ===
The airport opened on 23 April 1954, replacing the much smaller Bir Hassan Airfield, which was located a short distance north. At the time of its opening, the terminal was very modern and it featured an excellent spotters terrace with a café. The airport consisted of two asphalt runways at the time. Runway 18/36 at 3,250 metres (10,663 ft) was used primarily for landings from the 18 end while runway 03/21 at 3,180 metres (10,433 ft) was used primarily for take-offs from the 21 end and from the Sami end.

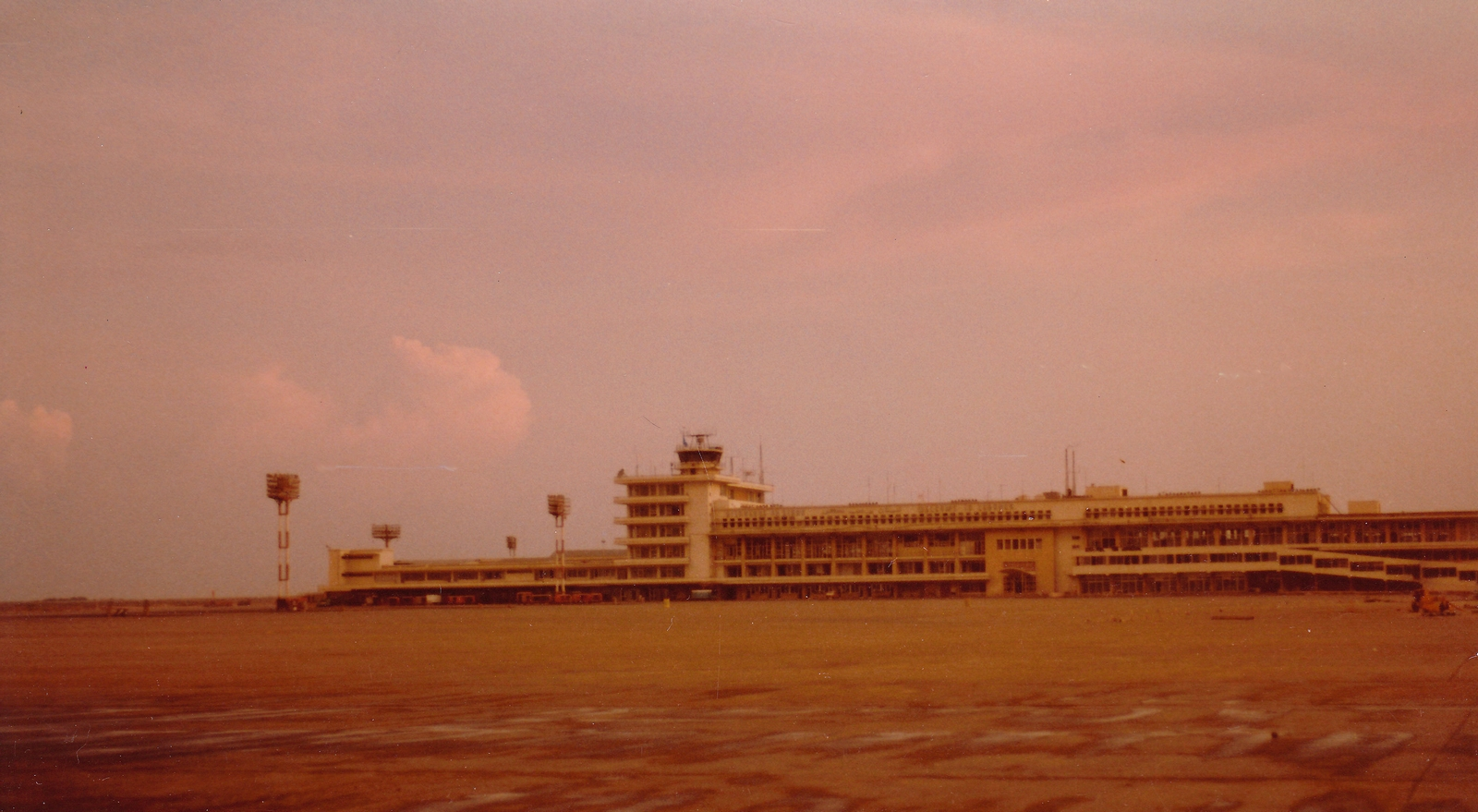
Beirut Airport in 1982

The airport grew to become a premier hub in the Middle East, thanks to limited competition from neighbours, with fast and steady growth by the country's four carriers at the time, Middle East Airlines (MEA), Air Liban, Trans Mediterranean Airways (TMA), and Lebanese International Airways (LIA), and numerous other foreign carriers.

=== 1968 Israeli raid ===
In response to an attack on El Al Flight 253 two days earlier in Athens, on the night of 28 December 1968, Israeli commandos mounted a surprise attack on the airport and destroyed 14 civilian aircraft operated by the Lebanese carriers, Middle East Airlines (Air Liban had merged with MEA by this time), Trans Mediterranean Airways, and Lebanese International Airways. This caused serious devastation to the Lebanese aviation industry. Middle East Airlines managed to rebound quickly, but Lebanese International Airways went bankrupt and its employees were transferred to MEA.

=== Lebanese Civil War ===
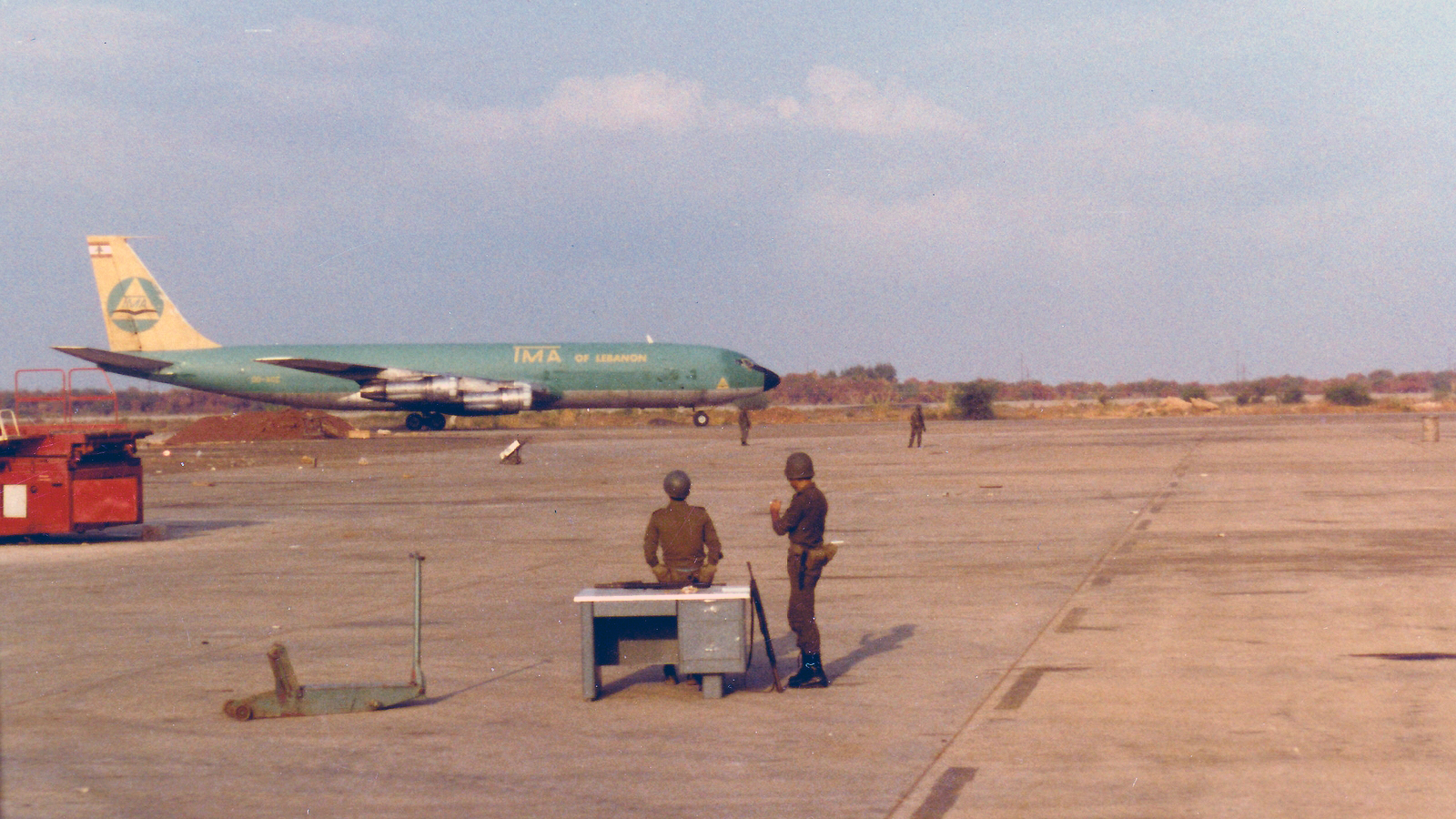
Beirut Airport in 1982

The airport lost its status as one of the premier hubs of the Middle East with the start of the 15-year-long Lebanese Civil War in April 1975 and lost virtually all of its airline services with the exception of two Lebanese carriers, Middle East Airlines and Trans Mediterranean Airways. Both airlines continued operating with the exception of certain periods of time when the airport itself was completely closed. Despite the conflict, the terminal was renovated in 1977, only to be badly damaged five years later by Israeli shelling during the 1982 Israeli invasion of Lebanon. The airport was the site of the 1983 Beirut barracks bombing, in which 241 American servicemen were killed. The airport's runways were renovated in 1982 and 1984.

=== Reconstruction ===
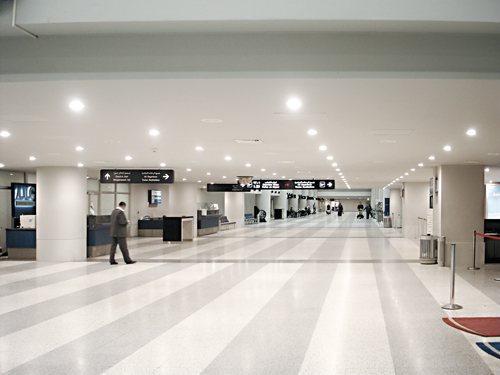
Inside the airport, with passenger check-in and the entrance to passport control out of frame to the right

By the time war finally came to an end in 1990, the airport needed to launch a massive reconstruction program. A ten-year reconstruction program was launched in 1994 which included the construction of another terminal, two runways, a fire station, a power plant, a general aviation terminal, and an underground parking garage. Many structures, like the radar building, were rehabilitated.

In 1998 the first phase of the new terminal was completed. It was located immediately adjacent to the east of the old terminal and consists of gates 1–12. After it was inaugurated, the old terminal was demolished and construction on the western half began and was completed in 2000, however it was not inaugurated until 2002. This consists of gates 13–23. The new terminal can handle 6 million passengers annually and is expected to be expanded to handle 16 million passengers by 2035.

It was decided early on that the original runways were no longer sufficient. A new landing runway, 17/35 was constructed protruding at an angle out into the sea, with a length of 3,395 metres (11,138 ft). This seaward protrusion was built in order to move landing traffic away from the city in a bid to improve safety and reduce aircraft noise. A new take-off runway was constructed parallel to the old 03/21 at a length of 3,800 metres (12,467 ft) making it the longest runway in the airport. The old 03/21 was converted to a taxiway for accessing the new runway 03/21. Unlike the old runways, the two new runways were constructed from concrete and feature more advanced lighting systems and instrument landing systems. In 2004, runway 17/35 was re-designated 16/34 and runway 18/36 was re-designated 17/35 after more accurate runway heading measurements were conducted. Despite being essentially replaced by and adjacent to the new runway 16/34, runway 17/35 is still open, although it is rarely used.

On 17 June 2005, the General Aviation Terminal was finally opened. It is located on the northwestern corner of the airport. All fixed-base operators and VIP charter providers have moved their operations to this state-of-the-art terminal.

=== 2006 war and aftermath ===
On 13 July 2006 at approximately 6:00 a.m. local time, all three runways of the airport sustained significant damage from missile strikes directed at it by the Israeli Air Force as part of the 2006 Lebanon War. The Israeli Air Force claimed that the airport was a military target because Hezbollah was receiving weapons shipments there. The runways were rendered inoperative and the Lebanese Government declared that the airport was closed until further notice.

Shortly thereafter, MEA used one of the long taxiways at the airport to evacuate five of its aircraft (four Airbus A321s and one Airbus A330).

The airport reopened to commercial flights on 17 August 2006, with the arrival of a Middle East Airlines (MEA) flight around 1:10 p.m. local time from Amman, followed by a Royal Jordanian flight also from Amman. This marked the first commercial flight arrival at Beirut International Airport since the airport's closure almost five weeks before. All runways and taxiways at the airport have been successfully repaired and the airport is operating as it was before the hostilities.

On 7 September 2006, Israel ended its 8-week long air blockade of Lebanon. The first plane to land at the airport after the end of the blockade was a Middle East Airlines flight at 6:06 p.m. local time. Soon after that, a Kuwait Airways flight landed at the airport. Over the next couple of days, more airlines resumed flights to the airport.

On 6 June 2007, U.S. President George W. Bush amended a ban on air traffic to Lebanon imposed since the 1985 hijacking of TWA Flight 847 to allow flights by the U.S. Government. A press release issued by the White House said that the "prohibition of transportation services to Lebanon...is hereby further amended to permit U.S. air carriers under contract to the United States Government to engage in foreign air transportation to and from Lebanon of passengers, including U.S. and non-U.S. citizens, and their accompanying baggage; of goods for humanitarian purposes; and of any other cargo or materiel."

In 2008, the Lebanese government discovered that Iran and Hezbollah had concealed a network of hidden cameras in the terminals and fired the airport's security officer (Wafik Shoukeir), who was linked to Hezbollah. Following the dismissals, Hezbollah operatives disrupted the airport's activities, and armed fighters on behalf of the organization took to the streets of Beirut, engaging in clashes with supporters of the government. As a result of agreements between Hezbollah and the Lebanese government, Hezbollah withdrew its forces from the streets of Beirut. Subsequently, Hezbollah increased its control over the airport and ensured an increase in the number of employees from the Shiite community. The International Civil Aviation Organization (ICAO) marked Hezbollah's involvement as a central point in the low safety rating of airport transportation and placed it on par with third-world countries.

=== Renovation and expansion ===
On 29 March 2018, Emirates operated a one-off Airbus A380 service to Beirut. It was a trial flight in order to test the airport's handling of the aircraft. The aircraft parked at gate 1, which is capable of handling the Airbus A380. This marked the first time the A380 had landed in Lebanon.

On 1 June 2019, the airport launched the new renovated and expanded departures and arrivals terminals. New customs counters were installed for both the departures and arrivals terminals. The airport is going to improve security by using newer equipment, relocate most of the security checkpoints, install an improved baggage handling system and inaugurate a fast track system for business and first class passengers by the end of the summer.

On 4 August 2020, a massive explosion in Beirut resulted in the airport sustaining moderate damage to the terminal buildings. Doors and windows were destroyed, and ceiling tiles were shaken loose by the shockwave, severing electrical wires. Despite the damage, flights to the airport resumed following the explosion.

In March 2023, it was announced that the airport would be expanded with a second terminal to be operated by a leading Irish airport company. According to the Minister of Transportation, Terminal 2 will bring in investments worth $122 million and will handle 3.5 million passengers annually.

=== 2024 ===
In June 2024, a report by The Telegraph revealed that Hezbollah has been using the Beirut–Rafic Hariri International Airport to store large quantities of Iranian weapons. The report claims that the weapons are transported from Iran and stored in hidden locations within the airport complex. This has raised significant security concerns and has led to calls for increased monitoring and inspection of cargo passing through the airport. International observers have urged for immediate action to address the potential risks associated with this development.

The Lebanese government denied these claims and invited journalists and foreign ambassadors to inspect the airport facilities. However, journalists were barred from entering the air cargo center during the tour, allowing only diplomats access.

== Passenger terminal ==
The terminal consists of two wings: the East and West Wing, which are connected together by the main terminal, forming a U‑shaped building, with each wing being parallel to the other, and the main terminal connecting the wings. The modern terminal consists of 23 gates, 19 of which have jetways, two of which are dual jetway gates for large aircraft, and two are bus gates which have been decommissioned. Smoking is prohibited in almost all areas inside the terminal, with a few exceptions (see East and West Wing section below).

=== Main Terminal ===
The main terminal includes the bulk of the duty-free, some other shops, restaurants, and the lounges. The main terminal has four levels:

- The ground level, which contains the arrival area, and also contains a duty-free section for arriving passengers next to baggage claim. The duty-free shops and baggage area are accessible to arriving passengers after they clear passport control, but before they clear customs (this duty-free, like all the others, is not open to the general public). The general public has access to the waiting area, and there are various cafes and restaurants open to the public.
- The second level contains the departure area, ticketing, security checkpoint, customs, and immigration. It also includes the primary duty-free shopping area, which is only accessible to ticketed passengers once they clear immigration.
- The third-level houses all of the private airline lounges, prayer rooms, as well as a restaurant with a view of the tarmac.
- The fourth level, which is closed to the public and passengers, mainly houses the airport administration offices.

=== East and West Wing ===
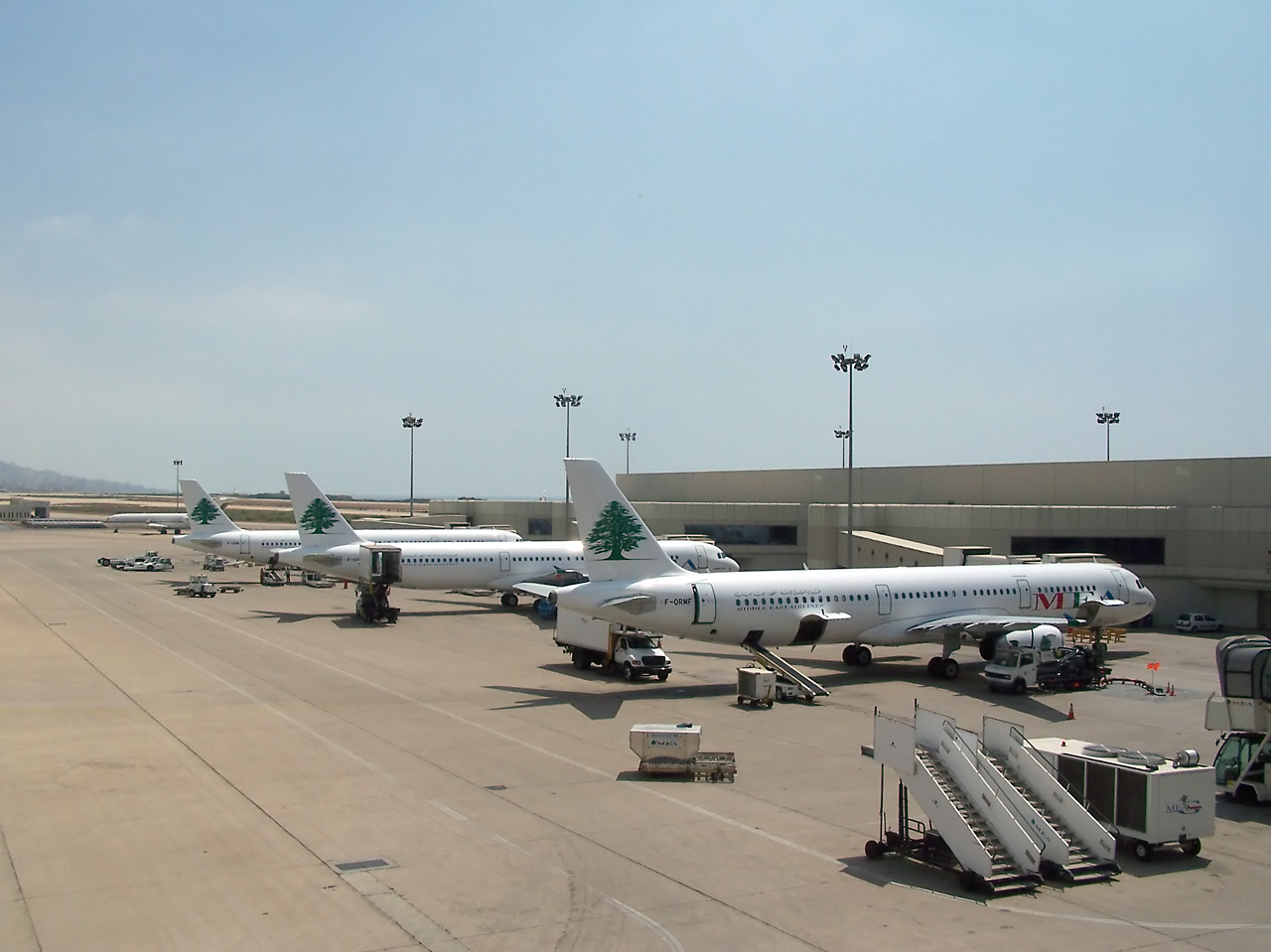
Three MEA A321s parked at the West Wing

Each wing contains its own departure gates, as well as two cafés (one of which features a smoking section), a newsstand, a tourism shop, and smaller duty-free shopping areas in each wing. The East Wing, which opened in 1998, has gates 1–12 and the West Wing, which opened in 2002, has gates 13–23. Gates 2 and 3 are dual jetway gates for large aircraft. Gates 4 and 22 are bus boarding gates, however these are almost never used. The only way to move from one wing to the next is through the main terminal.

=== Passenger services ===
The airport also includes banks, a post office, massage chairs, prayer rooms, and a tourist information centre. The airport was the first in the region to offer 5G wireless internet services available for free for 2 hours.

== Airlines and destinations ==
=== Passenger ===
The airport is serve by the following airlines:

Airlines	Destinations
Aegean Airlines	Athens
Air Algerie	Algiers (suspended)
Air Arabia	Abu Dhabi, Sharjah
Air Côte d'Ivoire	Seasonal: Abidjan (suspended)
Air France	Paris Charles de Gaulle
AJet	Istanbul–Sabiha Gökçen, Ankara
Condor	Düsseldorf
Cyprus Airways	Larnaca
Egyptair	Cairo
Emirates	Dubai
Etihad	Abu Dhabi
Ethiopian Airlines	Addis Ababa
Eurowings	Berlin, Düsseldorf, Hannover, Stockholm–Arlanda
Fly Dubai	Dubai
Iraqi Airways	Baghdad, Erbil, Najaf
Jazeera Airways	Kuwait City
Kuwait Airways	Kuwait City
LOT Polish Airlines	Seasonal: Warsaw–Chopin (suspended)
Lufthansa	Frankfurt (resumes on 30 November)
Middle East Airlines	Amsterdam, Berlin, Jeddah , Riyad, Dubai, Abu Dhabi, Dammam, Kuwait city, Doha, Brussels, Larnaca, Paris Charles de Gaulle, London Heathrow, Frankfurt, Rome Fiumicino, Milan Malpensa, Madrid–Barajas Airport, Athens, Geneva, Copenhagen, Düsseldorf, Barcelona-El Prat, Mykonos, Amman, Al Najaf, Basra, Baghdad, Cairo, El Sahel El Shamali, Erbil, Istanbul, Yerevan, Abidjan, Lagos, Accra Seasonal: Medina, Nice
Pegasus Airlines	Istanbul–Sabiha Gökçen, Antalya Seasonal: Dalaman, Bodrum
Qatar Airways	Doha
Royal Jordanian	Amman
SalamAir	Muscat
Scandinavian Airlines	Copenhagen, Stockholm–Arlanda
Swiss International Air Lines	Zürich
TAROM	Bucharest
Transavia	Paris Orly, Marseille,, Lyon
Turkish Airlines	Istanbul

== Statistics ==
Passenger use and aircraft movements have increased each year since 1990 with the exception of 2006 (due to the 2006 Lebanon War), 2020 (due to the COVID-19 pandemic) and 2024 (due to the Hezbollah-Israel conflict) which saw a sharp decrease in both. Total cargo has trended upwards since 1990 but also experienced a significant decrease in 2006.

Busiest Western Europe routes from Beirut International Airport
Rank	City	Passengers (2024 data)	Carriers
1	Istanbul Airport	593,925	Turkish Airlines, Middle East Airlines
2	Paris Charles de Gaulle	303,231	Middle East Airlines, Air France
3	London Heathrow	301,512	Middle East Airlines
4	Sabiha Gökçen International Airport	190,315	Pegasus Airlines, AJet
5	Larnaca Airport	147,120	Middle East Airlines, Cyprus Airways
6	Athens Airport	129,774	Aegan Airlines, Middle East Airlines
7	Frankfurt Airport	123,433	Lufthansa, Middle East Airlines
8	Antalya Airport	82,999	AJet
9	Rome Fiumicino Airport	73,550	Middle East Airlines
10	Adana Airport	48,115	AJet
11	Geneva Airport	47,553	Middle East Airlines

International scheduled weekly departures from Beirut International Airport (2026)
Rank	City	Number of weekly departures	Passengers (2017)	Carriers
1	Istanbul	65-75 (Note: number of flights depend on the season)	---	Middle East Airlines, Pegasus Airlines, Turkish Airlines, AJet
2	Dubai	38-42	---	Emirates, flydubai, Middle East Airlines
3	Cairo	34-38	---	EgyptAir, Middle East Airlines
3	Doha	28-30	---	Middle East Airlines, Qatar Airways
2	Amman	38-42	---	Middle East Airlines, Royal Jordanian
6	Paris	21-26	---	Air France, Middle East Airlines, Transavia France
7	Riyadh	14-17	---	Flynas, Middle East Airlines, Saudia
8	Larnaca	14-21	---	Cyprus Airways, Middle East Airlines
9	Kuwait City	14-21	---	Jazeera Airways, Kuwait Airways, Middle East Airlines
10	Sharjah	7-10	---	Air Arabia
11	Jeddah	14-18	---	Flynas, Middle East Airlines, Saudia
12	Frankfurt	7-10	---	Lufthansa, Middle East Airlines
13	Abu Dhabi	14-17	---	Etihad, Middle East Airlines
13	London	7	---	Middle East Airlines
13	Rome	3-5	---	Middle East Airlines
16	Athens	11-14	---	Aegean Airlines, Middle East Airlines
17	Baghdad	21-28	---	Fly Baghdad, Iraqi Airways, Middle East Airlines
18	Addis Ababa	7-10	---	Ethiopian Airlines
18	Bahrain	7-10	---	Gulf Air
20	Najaf	13-16	---	Iraqi Airways, Middle East Airlines
21	Dammam	3-5	---	Middle East Airlines
21	Nice	2-4	---	Air France, Middle East Airlines
23	Antalya	6-10	---	Pegasus Airlines, Turkish Airlines
24	Yerevan	3-5	---	Armenia Aircompany, Middle East Airlines
25	Bucharest	2-4	---	TAROM
25	Copenhagen	2-4	---	Middle East Airlines, Scandinavian Airlines
25	Geneva	4-7	---	Middle East Airlines
29	Barcelona	3-5	---	Middle East Airlines
29	Basra	2-4	---	Iraqi Airways, Middle East Airlines
29	Brussels	3-5	---	Middle East Airlines
29	Casablanca	3-4	---	Royal Air Maroc
29	Milan	4-7	---	Middle East Airlines
29	Marseille	2-4	---	Transavia
36	Adana	2-4	---	AJet
36	Erbil	10-14	---	Middle East Airlines
36	Tunis	2-3	---	Tunisair
36	Warsaw	2-4	---	LOT Polish Airlines

Statistics for Beirut International Airport
Year	Total passengers	Total cargo (metric tons)	Total aircraft movements
1990	637,944		8,048
1991	837,144	44,064	10,822
1992	1,092,645	48,859	14,963
1993	1,343,289	45,539	16,581
1994	1,489,429	54,007	19,045
1995	1,672,657	49,742	20,478
1996	1,715,434	46,505	21,004
1997	1,715,434	46,505	21,004
1998	2,006,956	55,037	23,051
1999	2,222,344	54,300	25,010
2000	2,343,387	52,439	29,707
2001	2,444,851	62,789	30,627
2002	2,606,861	65,913	32,952
2003	2,840,400	65,674	34,468
2004	3,334,710	62,081	39,023
2005	3,892,356	68,852	44,295
2006	2,463,576	52,638	27,870
2007	3,009,749	59,387	32.674
2008	4,004,972	71,965	49,873
2009	4,952,899	57,545	66,122
2010	5,512,435	77,276	58,592
2011	5,596,034	74,004	63,666
2012	5,960,414	84,911	63,211
2013	6,249,503	106,361	62,980
2014	6,555,069	—	64,579
2015	7,203,781	—	68,872
2016	7,510,828	85,343	69,944
2017	8,230,990	—	71,169
2018	8,841,966	98,200	73,627
2019	8,689,603	87,517	72,279
2020	2,492,279	57,022	28,348
2021	4,322,269	61,200	37,848
2022	6,349,967	59,510	52,382
2023	7,127,649	62,140	57,159
2024	5,622,358	54,180	47,520
2025	7,011,129	55,800	63,500

== Ground transport ==
The airport has a three-level car park with a total capacity of 2,350 cars.

Public transportation to the airport does not exist, except for taxis. These tend to be more expensive than regular service taxis, however.

LCC Bus Route 1 takes passengers from the airport roundabout, which is located one kilometer from the terminal, to Rue Sadat in Hamra, whereas Route 5 takes to the Charles Helou bus station. OCFTC buses number seven and ten also stop at the airport roundabout, en route to central Beirut.

== Airport services ==
Airport services, like much else in Lebanon, are often divided and delegated based upon sectarian allegiance. Besides the Shia party Hezbollah, other groups, including Sunnis and Maronites, have their own fiefs within the airport's provision of services.

=== Ground handling providers ===
The airport has two ground handling operators, Middle East Airlines Ground Handling (MEAG) Lebanese Air Transport (LAT).

Lebanese Air Transport (LAT) is a smaller ground handling operator that conducts ground handling operations for a number of carriers serving the airport. LAT specialises in handling charter flights, but does have contracts with a number of scheduled carriers such as British Airways.

=== Fixed-base operators ===
The airport is home to four fixed-base operators (FBOs) for private aircraft.

LAT offers limited fixed-base operator services for private and executive aircraft. Executive Aircraft Services offers aircraft charter services, ground handling services, aircraft management, and aircraft acquisition and sales.

=== Aircraft maintenance providers ===
The airport is the home base of MidEast Aircraft Services Company (MASCO), an aircraft maintenance provider that specialises in Airbus maintenance, particularly the A320 and A330 series. It is a wholly owned subsidiary of the national carrier, MEA. MASCO has EASA 145 approval and as a result can maintain any aircraft registered in Europe.

== Other facilities ==
Middle East Airlines has its corporate headquarters and training centre at Beirut Airport.

== Accidents and incidents ==
- On 21 November 1959, Ariana Afghan Airlines Flight 202 crashed near Beirut on a flight from Beirut to Tehran, killing 24 of the 27 passengers and crew on board the Douglas DC-4.
- On 23 February 1964, Vickers Viscount SU-AKX of United Arab Airlines was damaged beyond economic repair in a heavy landing.
- In September 1970, Pan Am Flight 93 was hijacked while flying to New York. The plane landed to refuel and pick up another PFLP hijacker. It was then flown to Cairo where it was blown up.
- On 17 May 1977, Antonov An-12, SP-LZA, a cargo plane leased by LOT Polish Airlines from the Polish Air Force along with its crew, flying to Lebanon with a cargo of fresh strawberries crashed 8 kilometers from Beirut airport, all 6 crew members and 3 passengers on board were killed. The plane crashed due to the crew being lost in translation (i.e. the Polish-speaking crew did not understand the Lebanese Arabic language), which led to the crew repeating to themselves the order to descend, ending up with the aircraft unwittingly flying into the side of a mountain.
- On 23 July 1979, a TMA Boeing 707-320C, on a test flight for four copilots due to be promoted to captains, crashed whilst on a third touch-and-go. The plane touched down but then yawed right to left to right again before the wing clipped the ground causing the plane to flip and come to rest inverted across a taxiway. All six crew members were killed.
- On 8 January 1987, Middle East Airlines Boeing 707-323C OD-AHB was destroyed by shelling after landing.
- On 25 January 2010, Ethiopian Airlines Flight 409, bound for Addis Ababa, Ethiopia and carrying 90 passengers (of which 54 were Lebanese) crashed into the Mediterranean Sea shortly after take-off, killing everyone on board.

== See also ==
- Lebanese identity card
- Lebanese passport
- List of airports in Lebanon
- Transport in Lebanon
- Visa policy of Lebanon
- Visa requirements for Lebanese citizens
- List of the busiest airports in the Middle East
