= List of equipment of the Republic of China Navy =

Below is a list of equipment used by the Republic of China Navy (commonly known as the Taiwanese Navy).

== Aircraft ==
=== Fixed-wing ===
Name	Origin	Type	Variant	In service	Notes
NCSIST Albatross	Taiwan	Reconnaissance UAV		26	In service as of 2019
NCSIST Albatross II	Taiwan	Reconnaissance UAV		36	In service as of 2026.
NCSIST Cardinal	Taiwan	Reconnaissance UAV	Cardinal II	54	six units (54 aircraft) acquired in 2016

=== Helicopters ===
Name	Origin	Type	Variant	In service	Notes
Sikorsky S-70	United States	Search and rescue / Anti-submarine warfare	S-70C(M)-1/2 Thunderhawk	18	To be replaced
McDonnell Douglas MD 500 Defender	United States	Anti-submarine warfare	500MD/ASW Defender	7	Out of original 13 ordered
Surveillance UAV	Republic of China	Tactical short-range surveillance helicopter UAV		1446	Quadrone rotor helicopter drone, In service as of 2024.
Shipborne UAV	Republic of China	Tactical short-range surveillance helicopter UAV		16	single rotor helicopter drone, In service as of 2024.
TU-30VG	Taiwan	Reconnaissance helicopter UAV	TU-30VG	96	In service as of 2025.
Shield AI MQ-35 V-BAT	United States	VTOL unmanned aerial vehicle UAV	MQ-35 V-BAT	280	280 aircraft, 140 control systems and 82 transport vehicles on order in 2026. two drones per control station and 3-4 drones per transport unit.

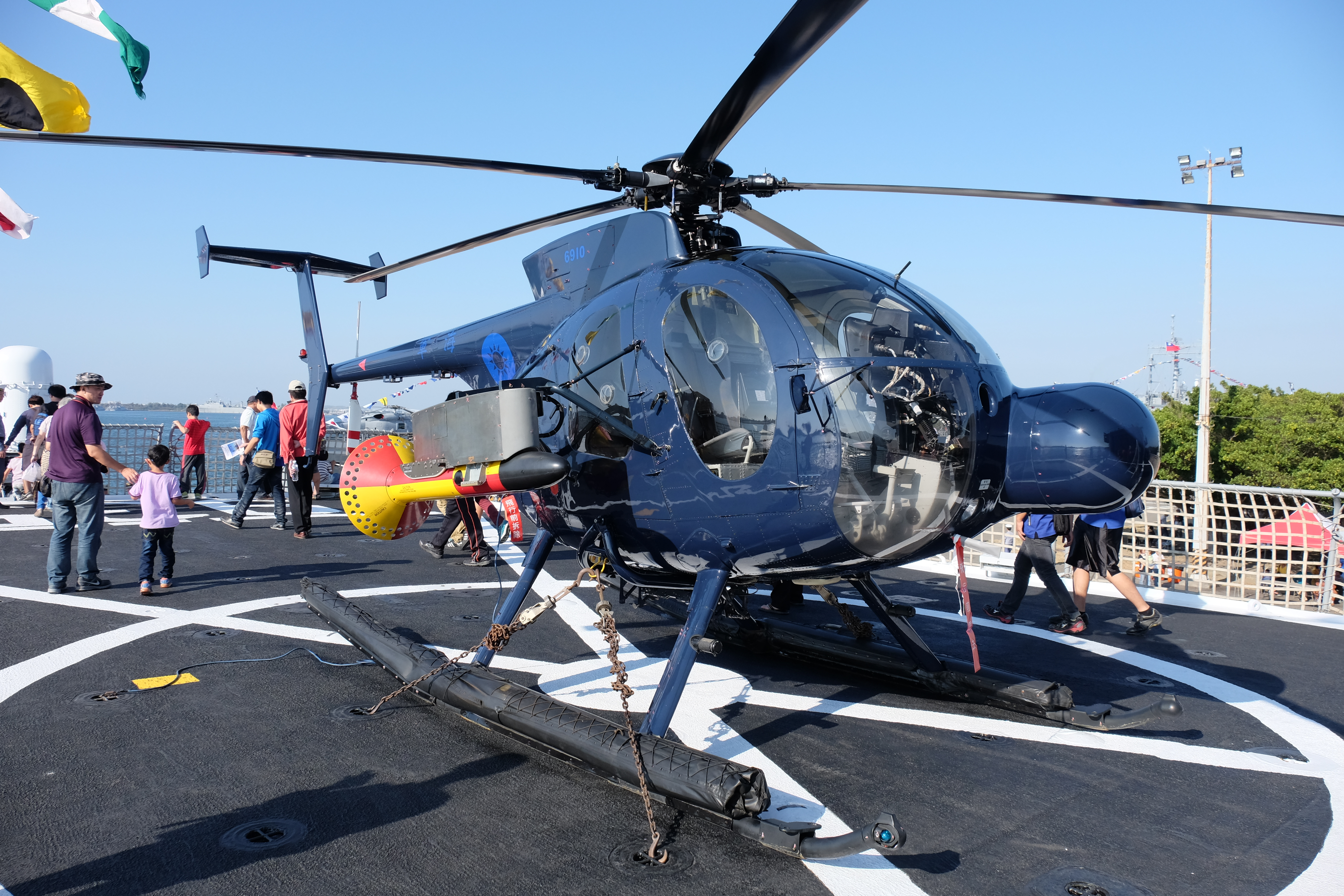
ROCN Hughes 500 "6910" carried on Lan Yang (FFG-935) helicopter deck from rear right view

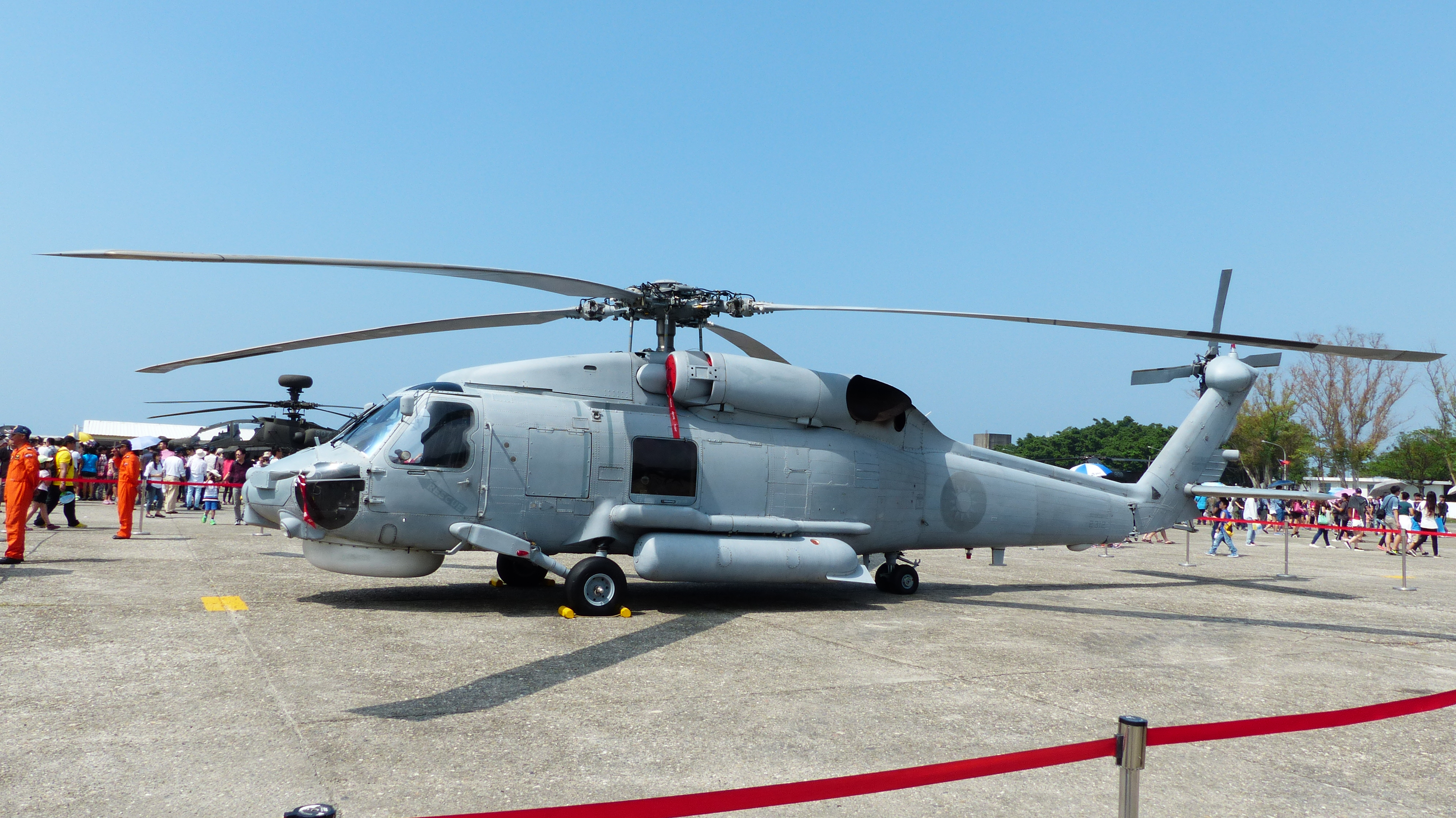
ROCN S-70C(M) "2312"

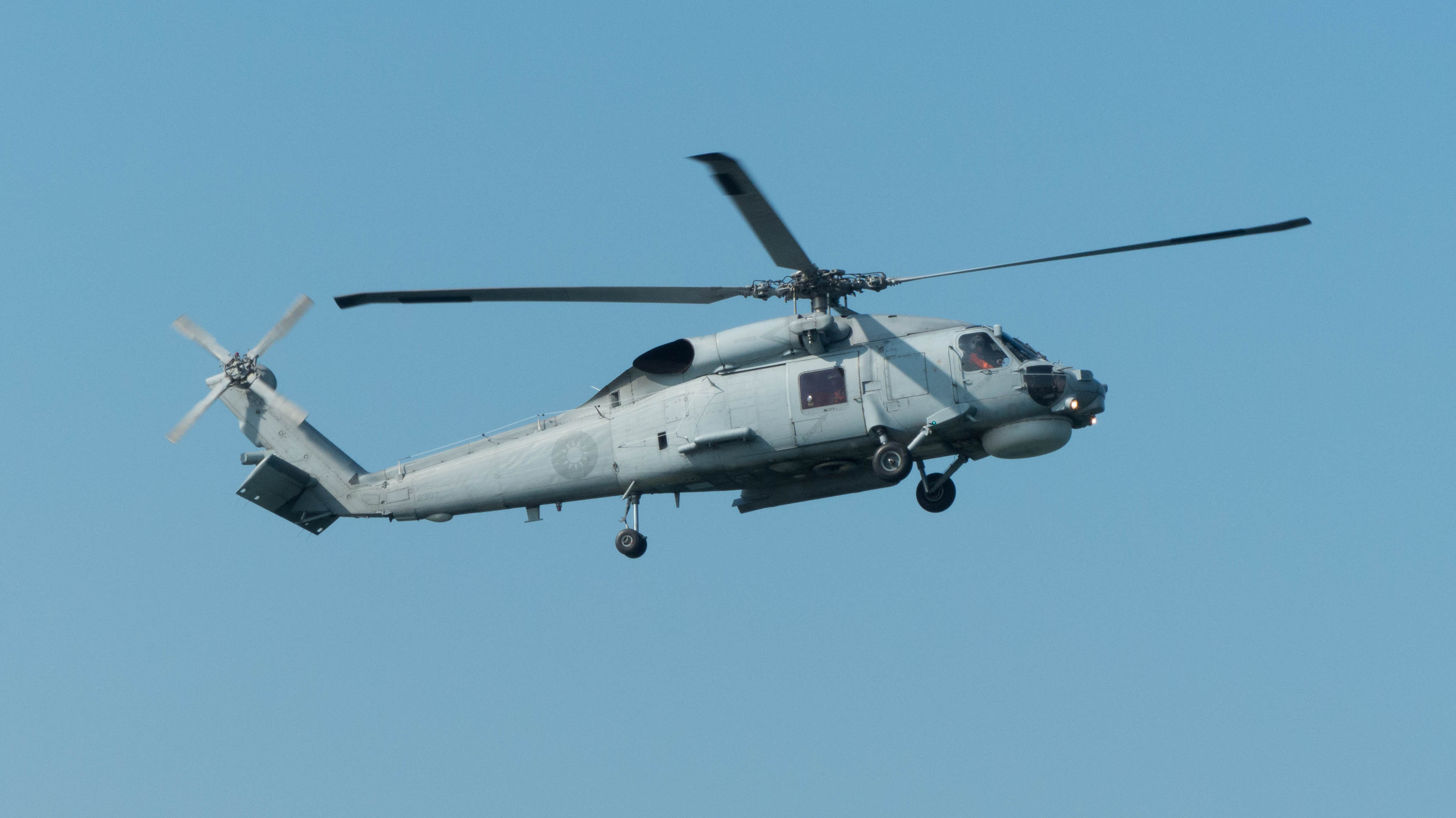
ROCN S-70C(M) "2307" flying over Zuoying Naval Base in the morning

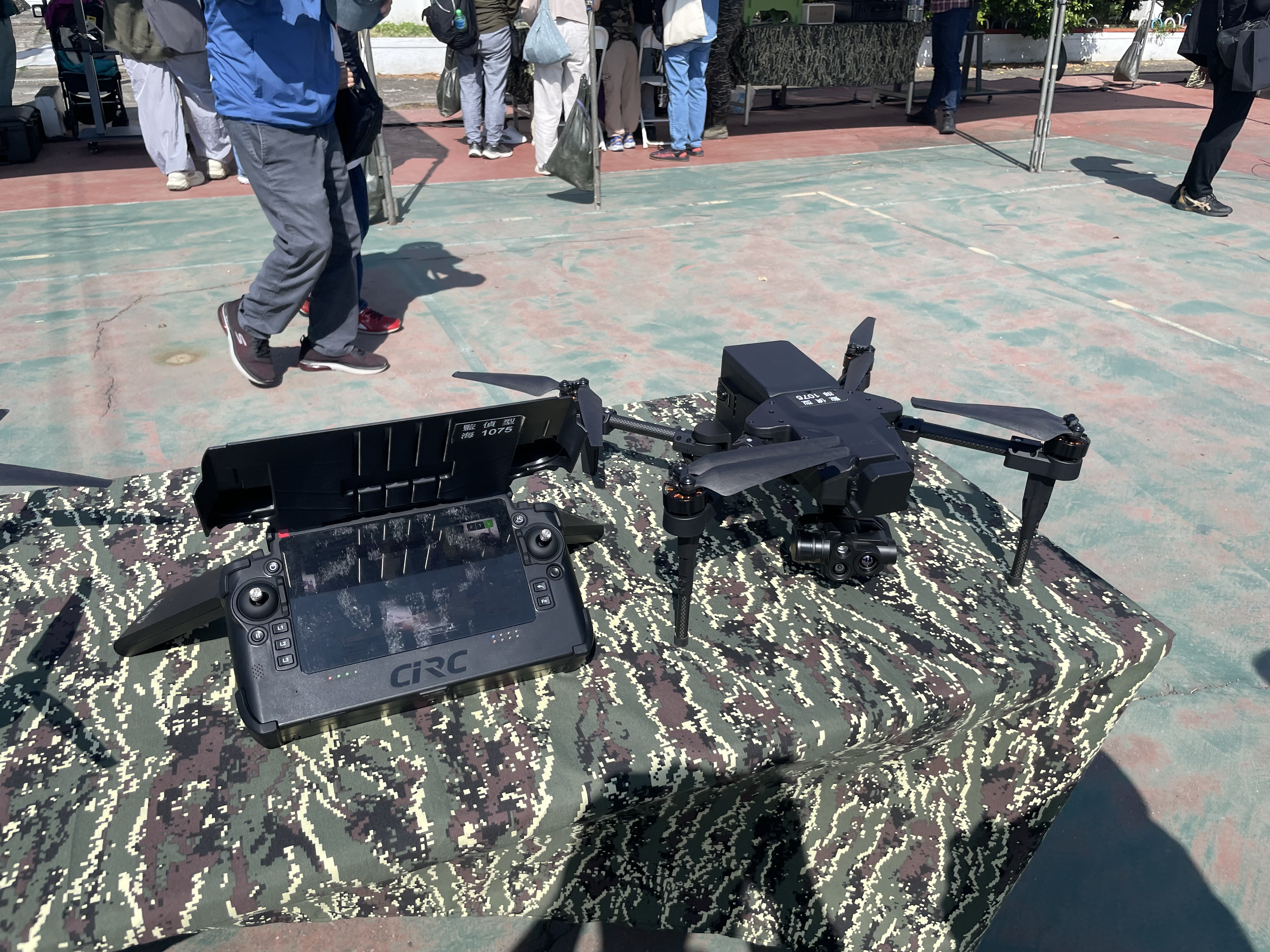
Surveillance UAV

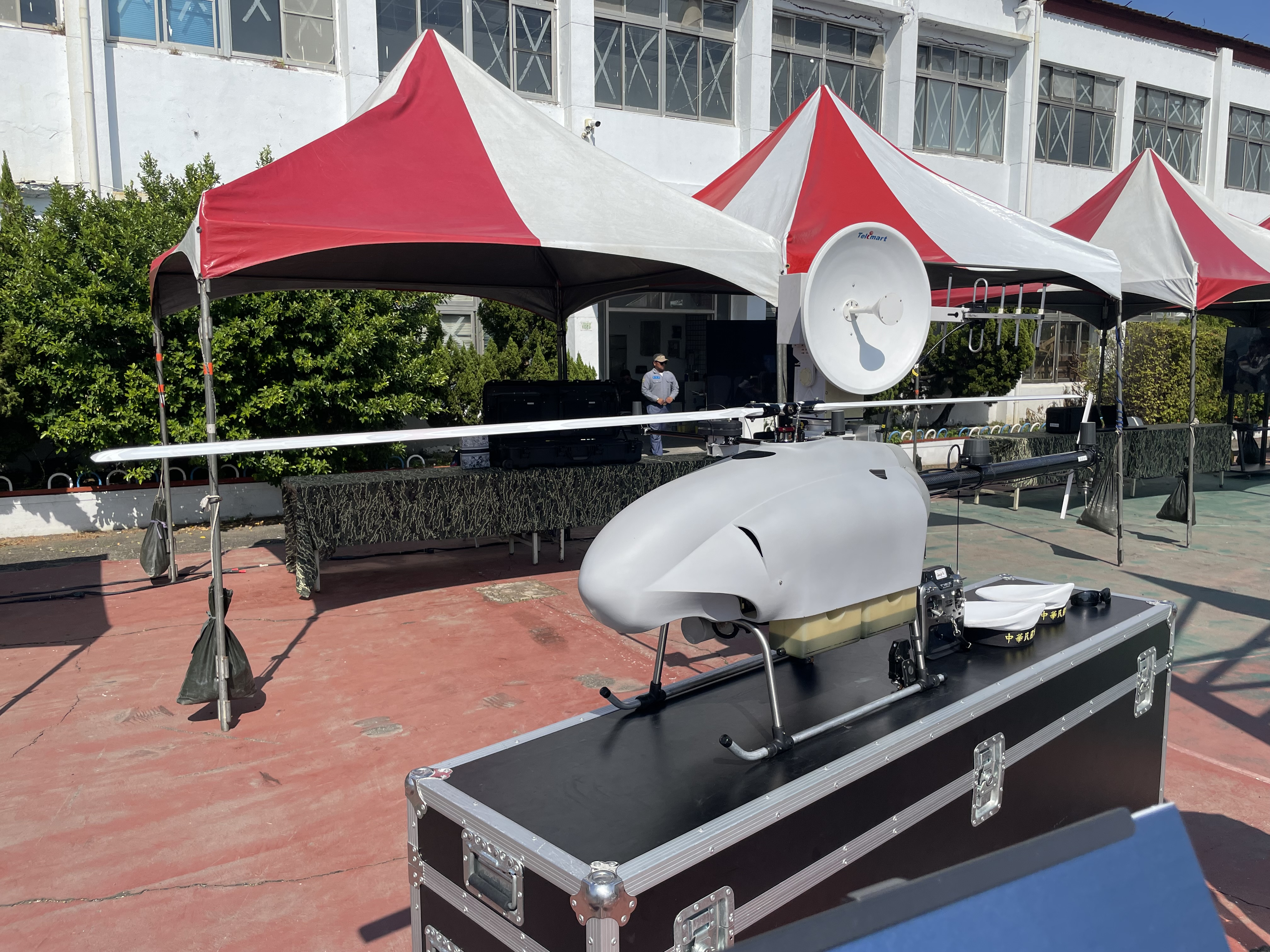
Shipborne UAV

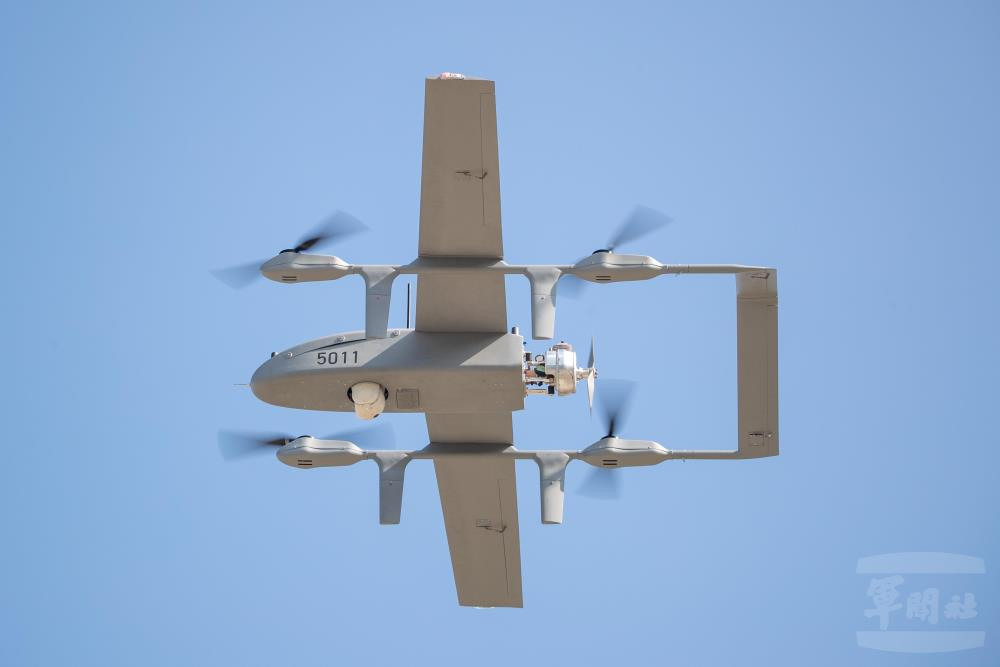
TU-30VG

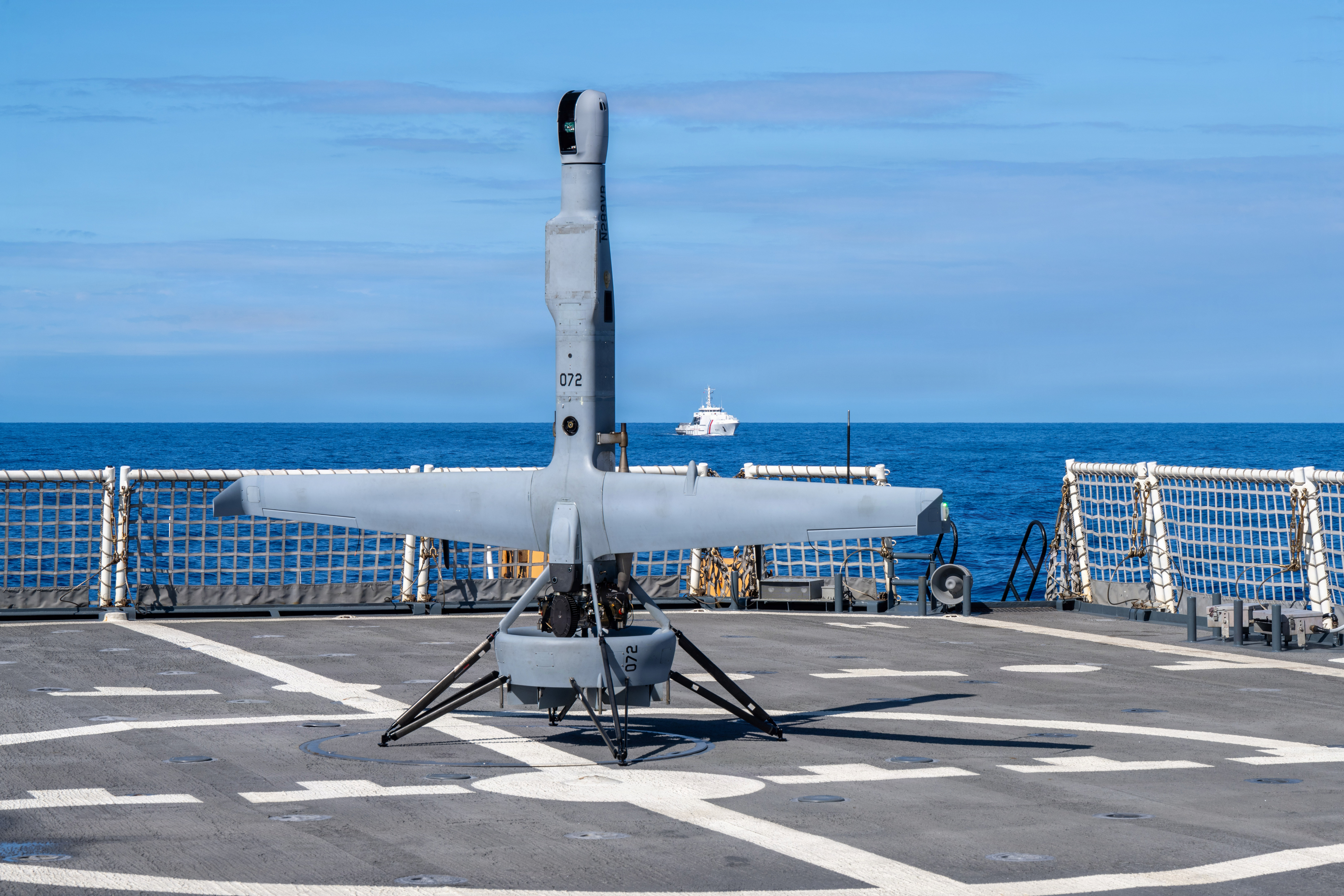
MQ-35 V-BAT

== Small watercraft ==
Platform	Origin	Manufacturer	Type	Notes
M8 MotorBoat	Taiwan			
M96 Motorboat	Taiwan	Karmin international		
M109 Special Operations Assault Boat	Taiwan	Karmin international		
RIB	Taiwan	Karmin international	Tender for Cheng Kung-class frigates	8
NCSIST Kuai Chi	Taiwan	National Chung-Shan Institute of Science and Technology	Unmanned surface vehicle	Entered service in 2025

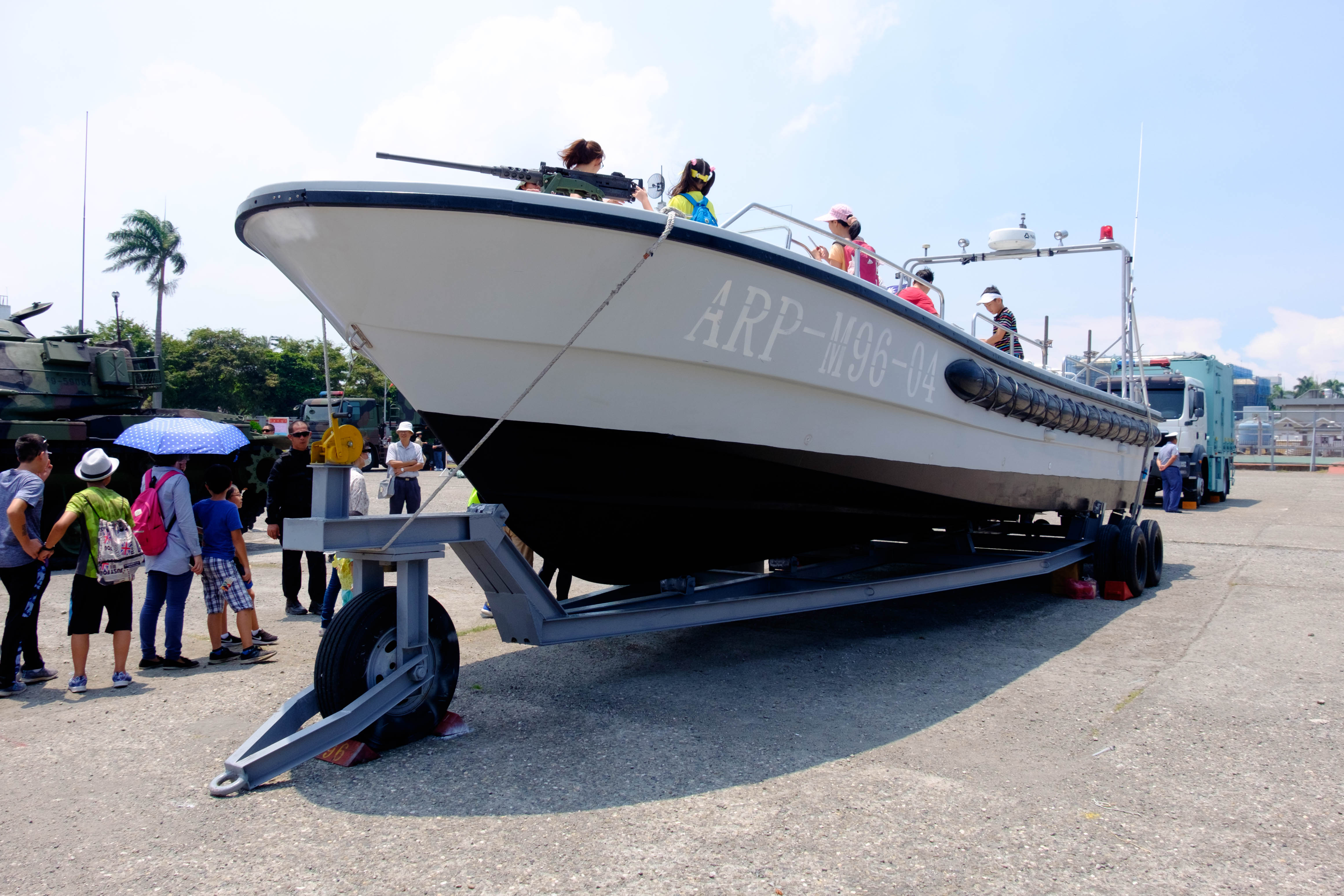
M96 motorboat

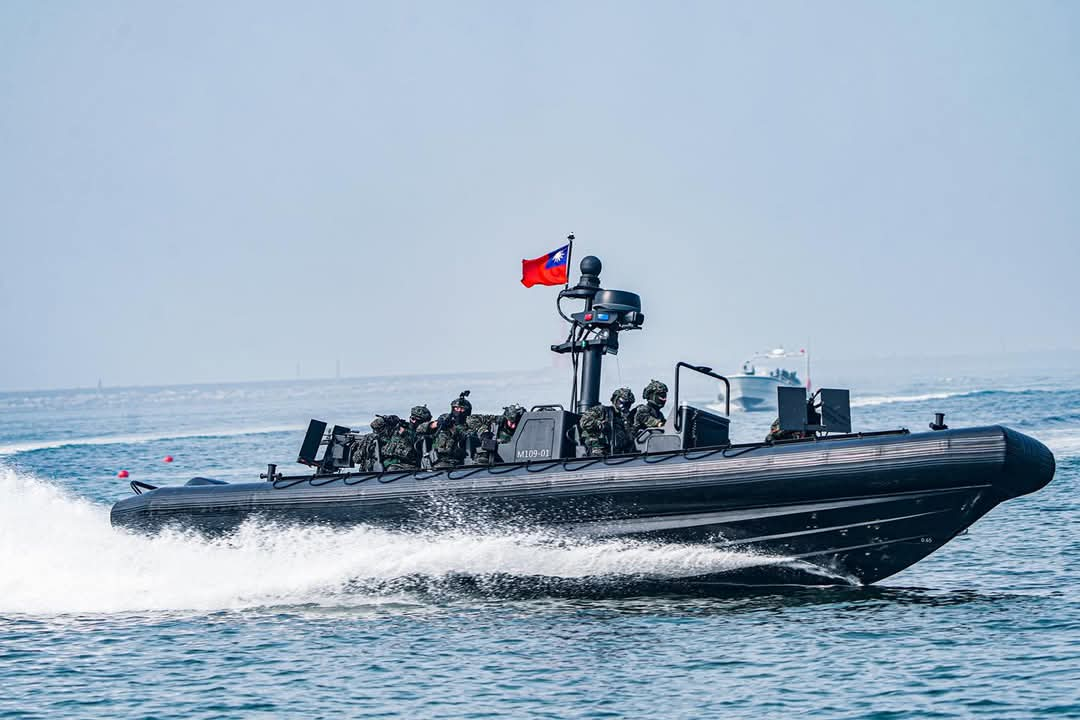
M109 Special Operations Assault Boat

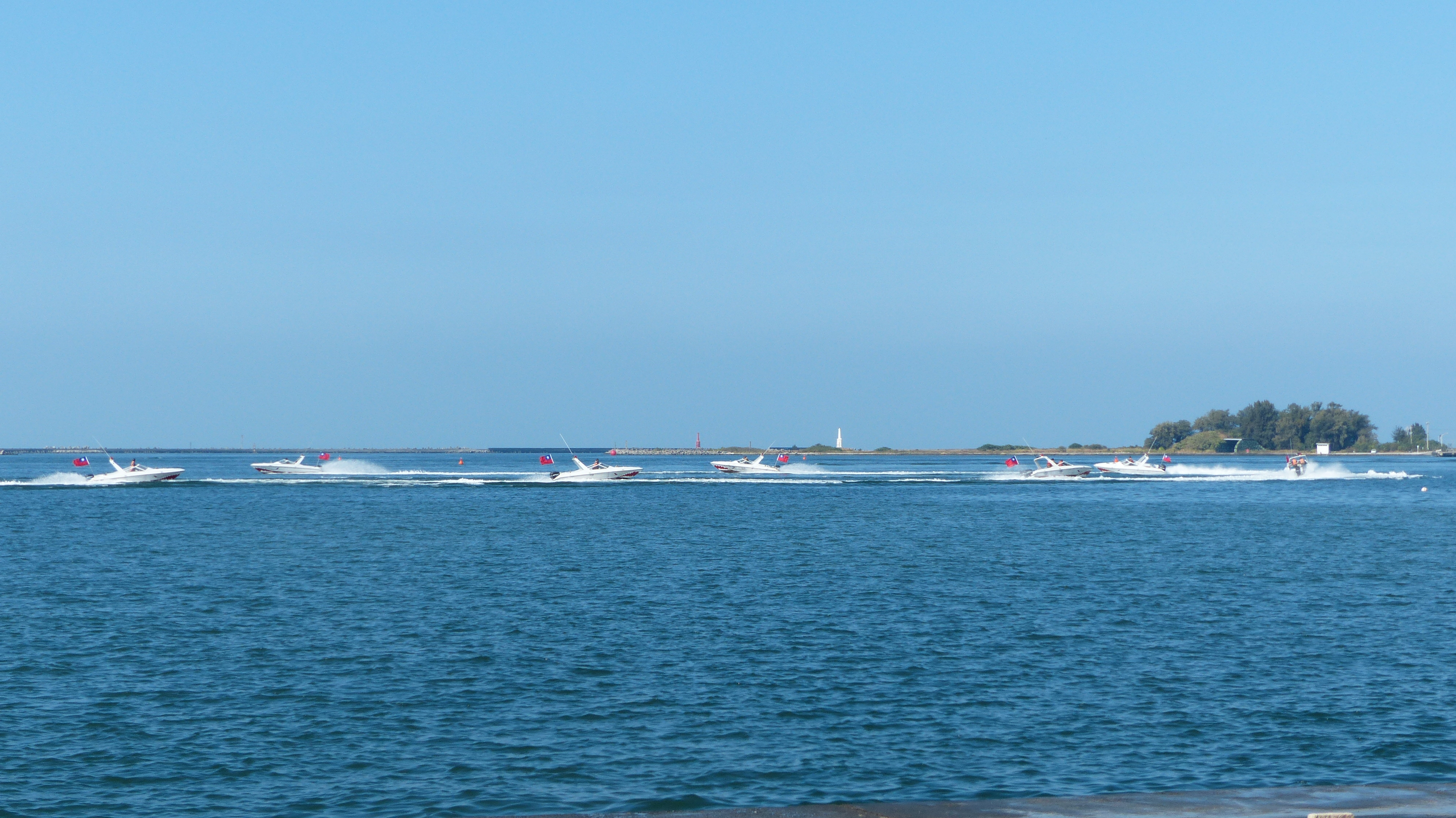
M8 MotorBoat

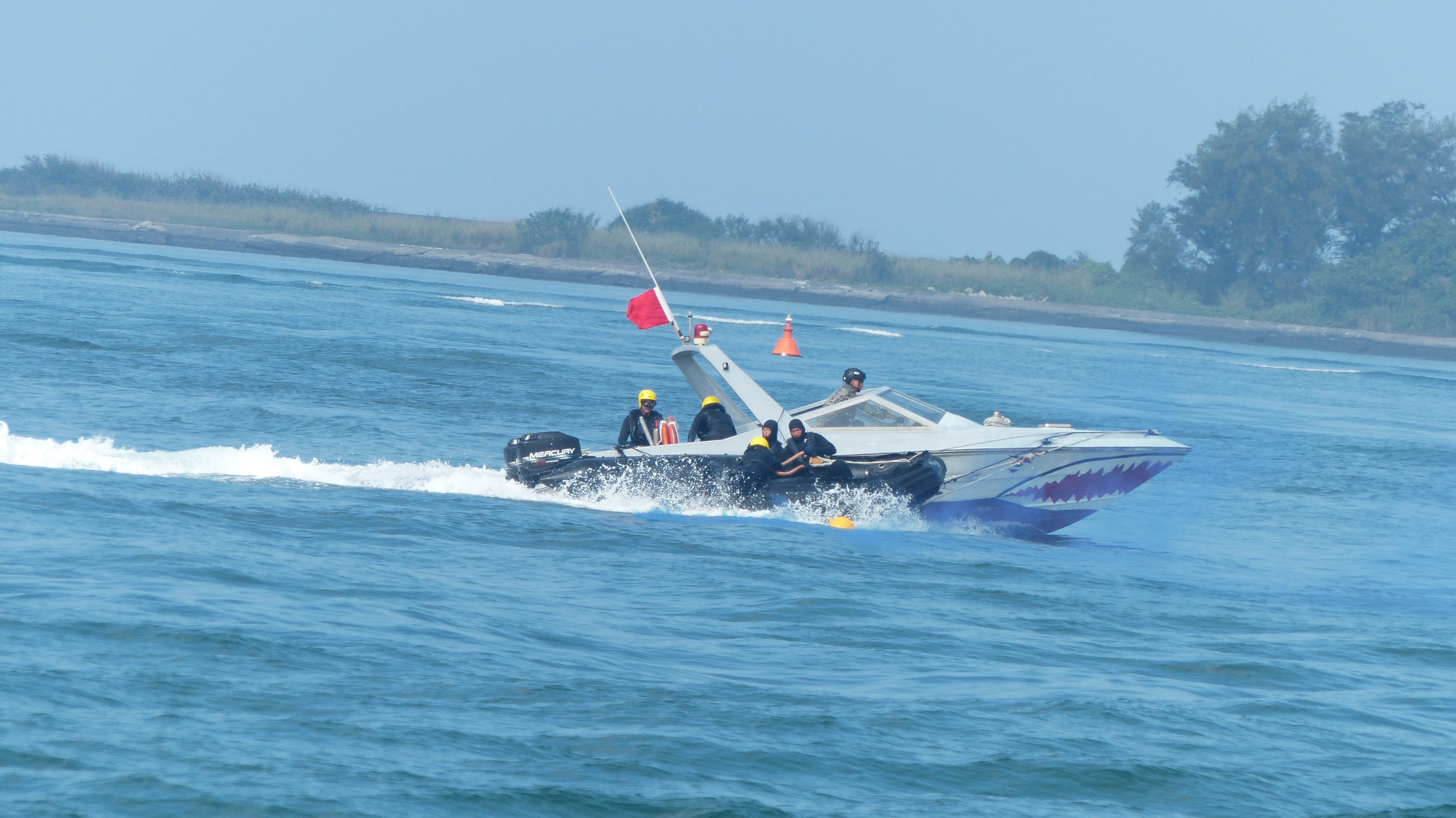
Marine Corps M8 MotorBoat

== Ground based strike ==
Name	Origin	Type	Notes
Loitering munitions and cruise missiles
Hsiung Feng II	Taiwan	Anti-ship cruise missile	In service
Hsiung Feng III	Taiwan	Anti-ship cruise missile	In service
Harpoon (missile)	United States	Anti-ship cruise missile	In service, 100 launch units and 400 missiles ordered

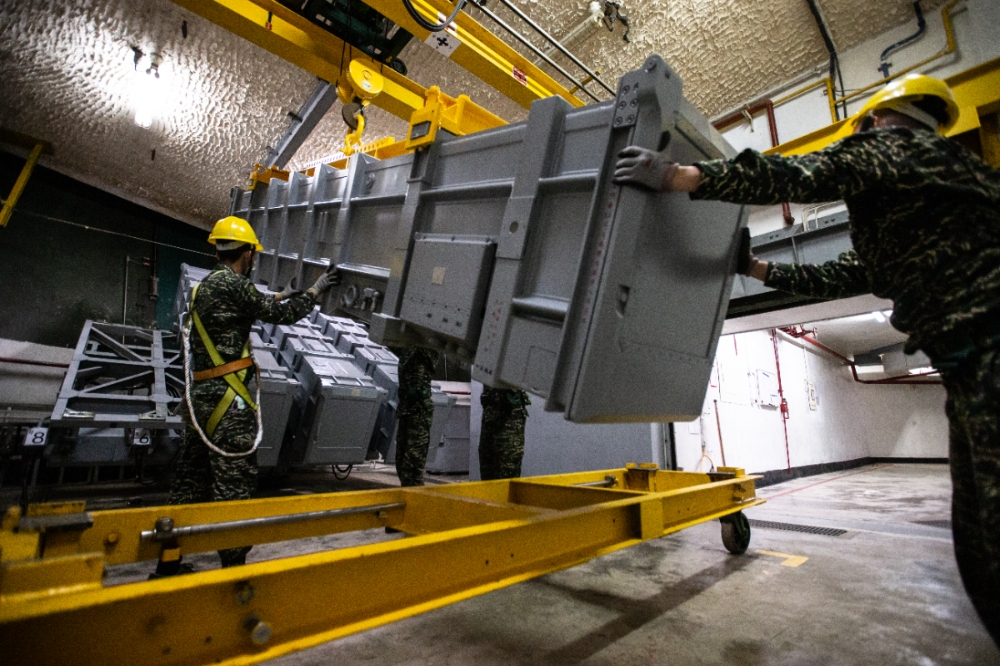
ROCN Hsiung Feng II missiles in an underground missile launch bunker

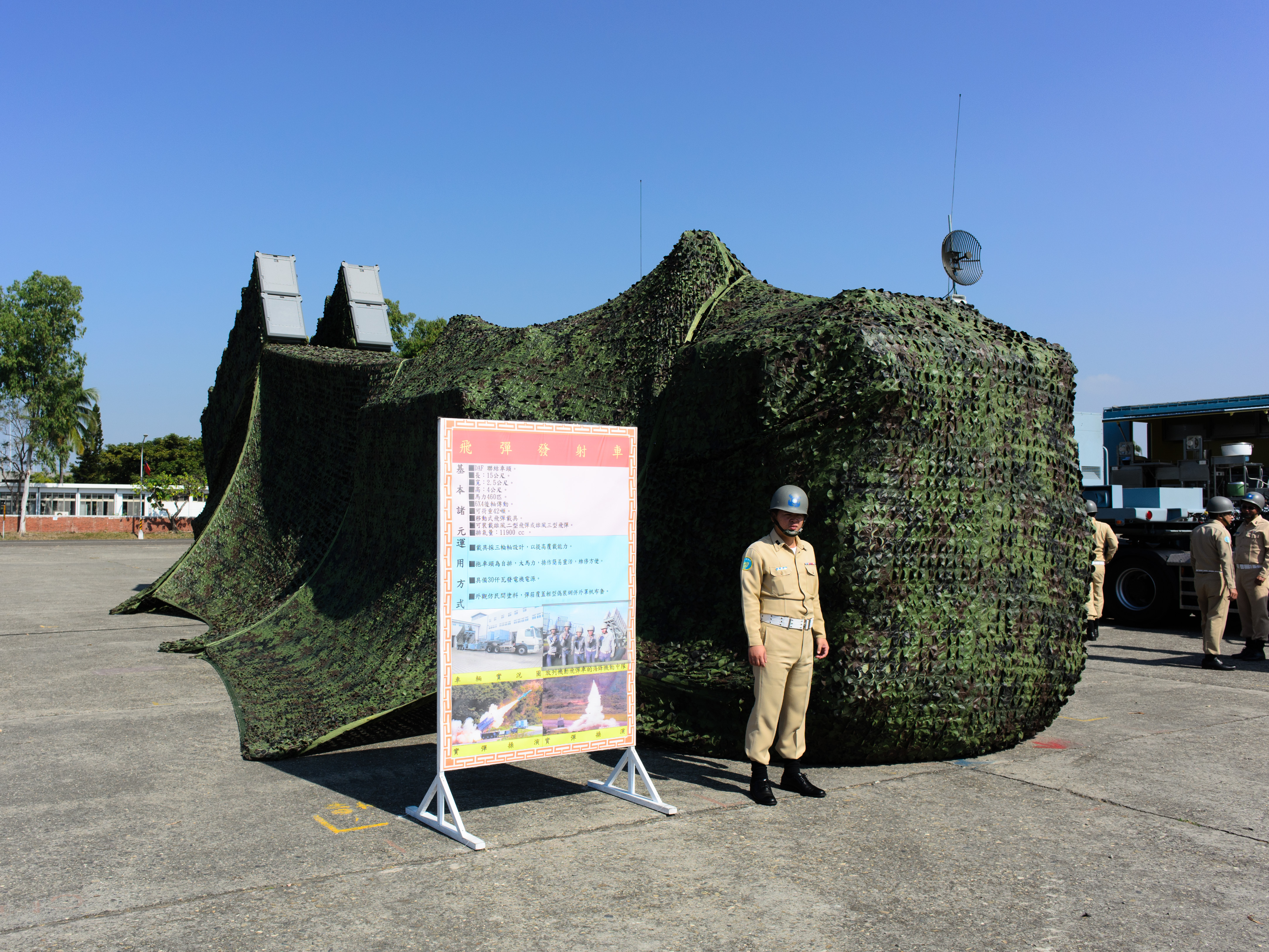
Covered ROCN Hsiung Feng II & Hsiung Feng III anti-ship missile launchers truck displayed at Zuoying Naval Base

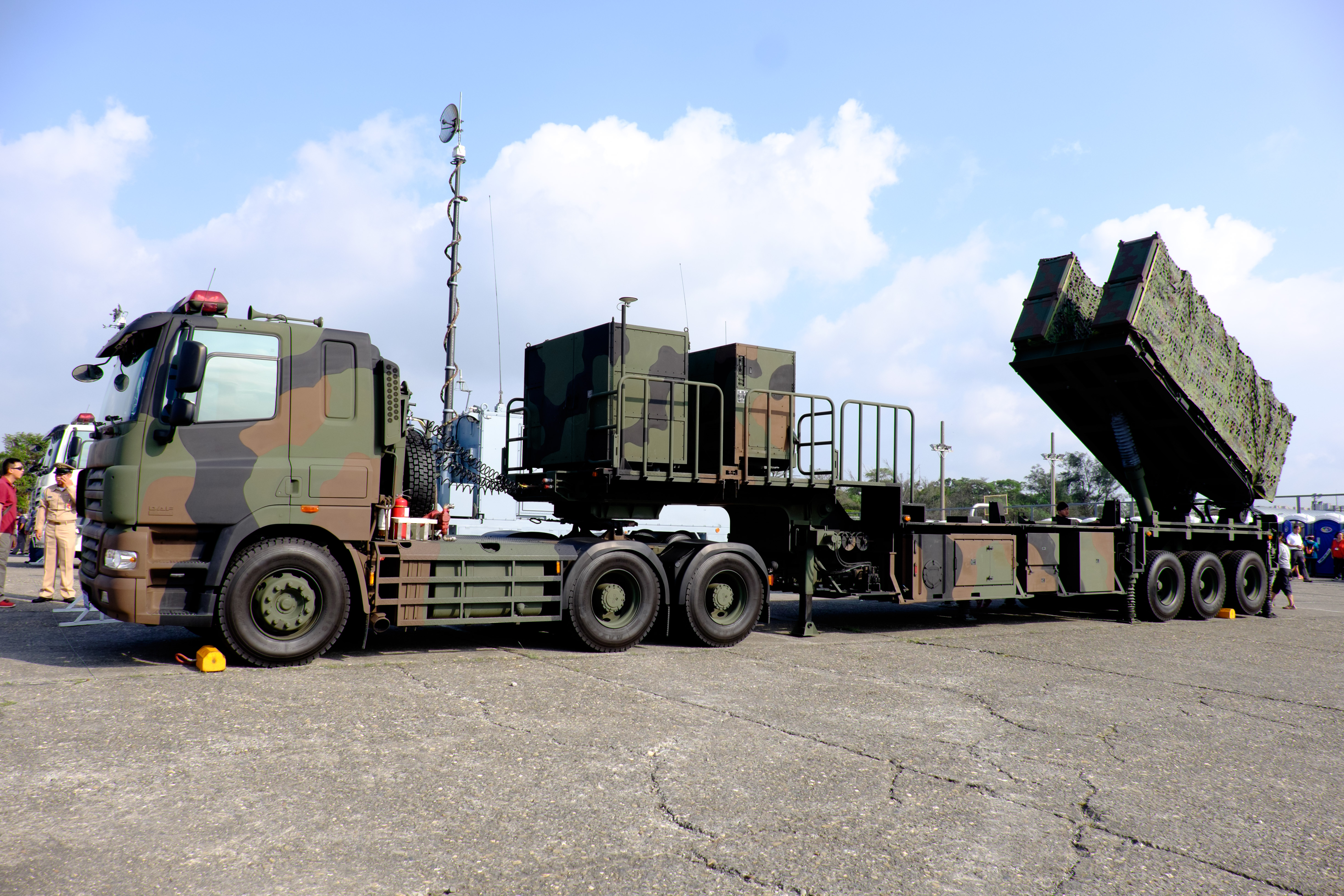
ROCN Hsiung Feng II & Hsiung Feng III anti-ship missile launchers truck

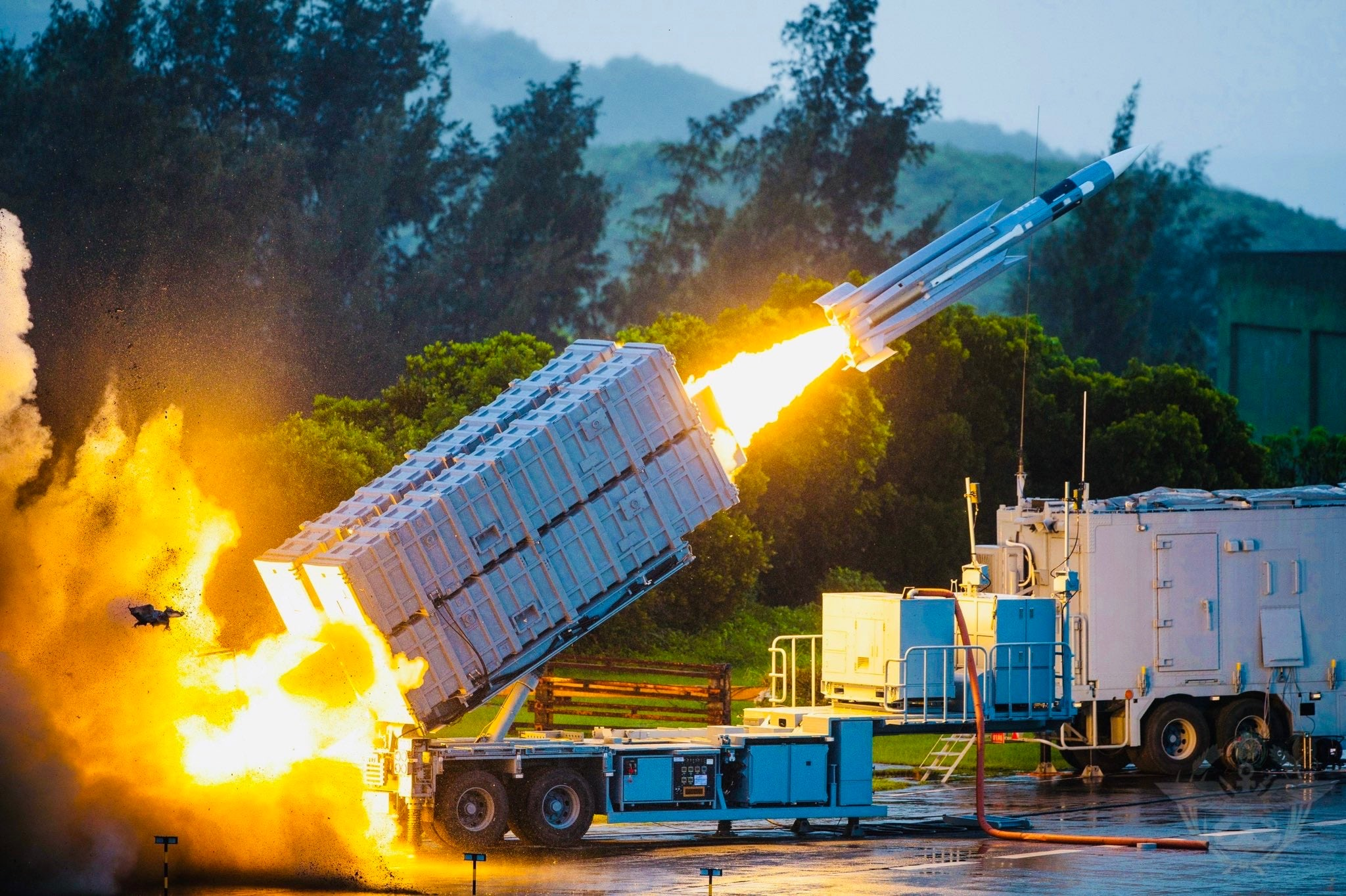
Hsiung Feng III anti-ship missile launched from a missile launchers truck

== Ships and naval armament ==
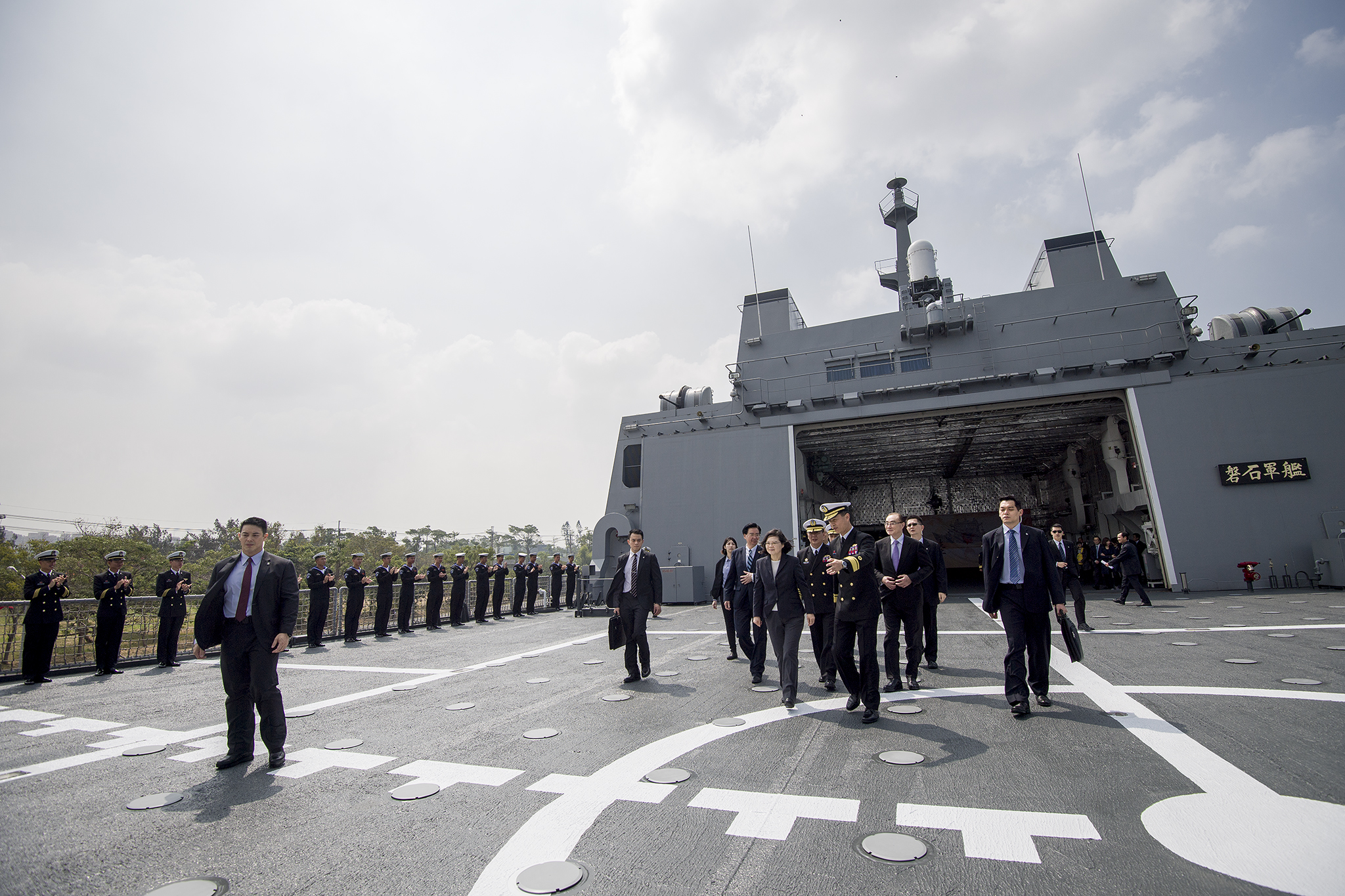
The President of Taiwan aboard the Pan Shi

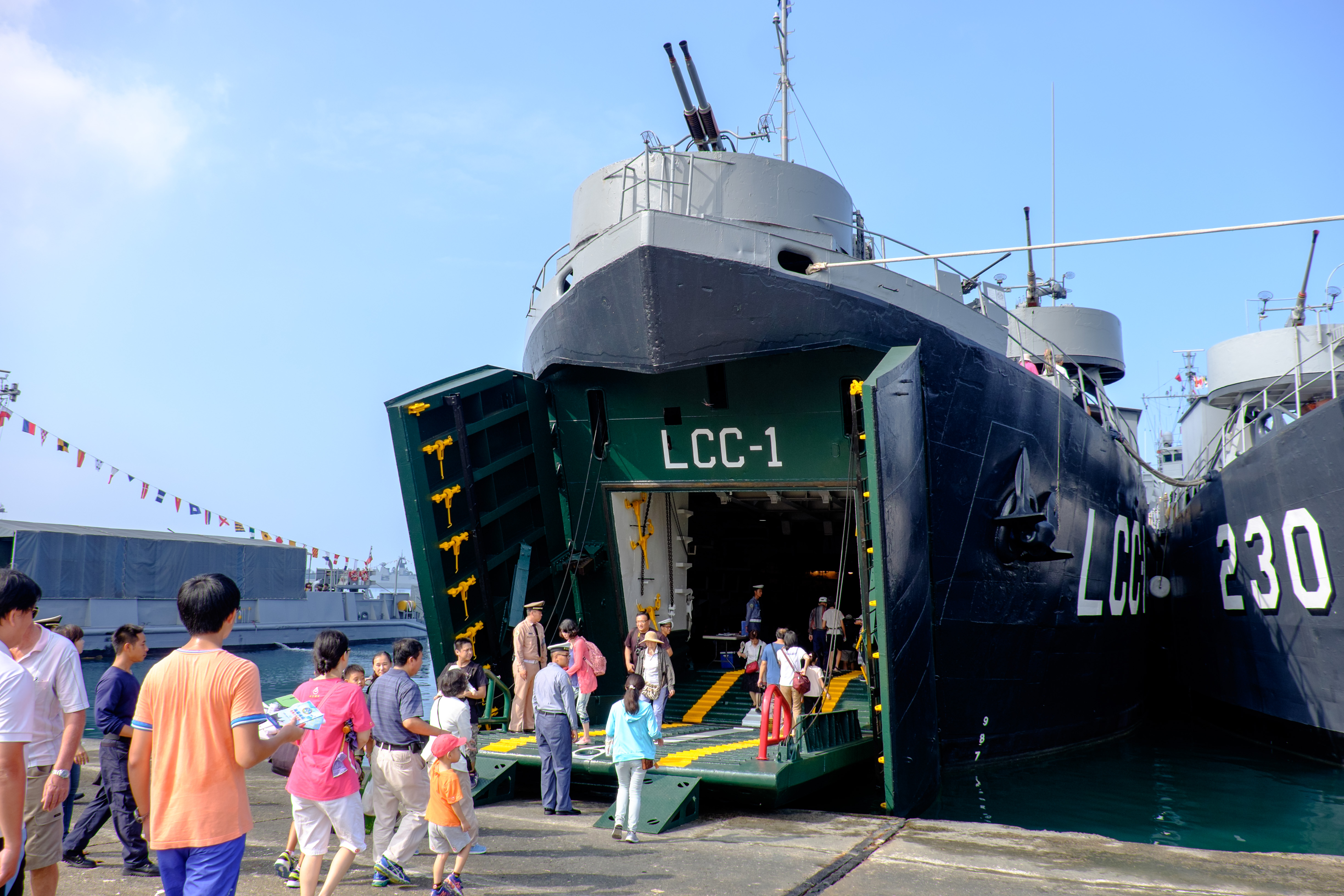
Visitors in front of ROCN Kao Hsiung (LCC-1)

=== Naval armament ===
==== Surface-to-air missiles ====
Name	Origin	Type	Notes
Sky Sword I	Taiwan	Short-range	Shipboard deployment with Sea Oryx system.
Sky Sword II	Taiwan	Medium-range	Unknown number of TC-2N, to be fielded on Tuo Chiang Block II corvettes and retrofitted on the Kang Ding-class frigates.
RIM-66 SM-1MR	United States	Medium-range	97 RIM-66B Standard-1MR delivered in 1993, 207 RIM-66B Standard-1MR delivered in 1994, 204 RIM-66B Standard-1MR delivered in 2001
RIM-66 SM-2MR	United States	Medium-long range	148 Standard Missile-2MR delivered in 2005, 144 Standard Missile-2MR delivered in 2008, 16 Standard Missile-2MR ordered in 2017
FIM-92 Stinger	United States	Short-range	250 missiles, 70 launch systems and 62 friend-or-foe identification systems, by 2025.
RIM-72C Sea Chaparral	United States	Short-range	Deployed on some domestic warships as well as La Fayette Frigates. To be replaced.

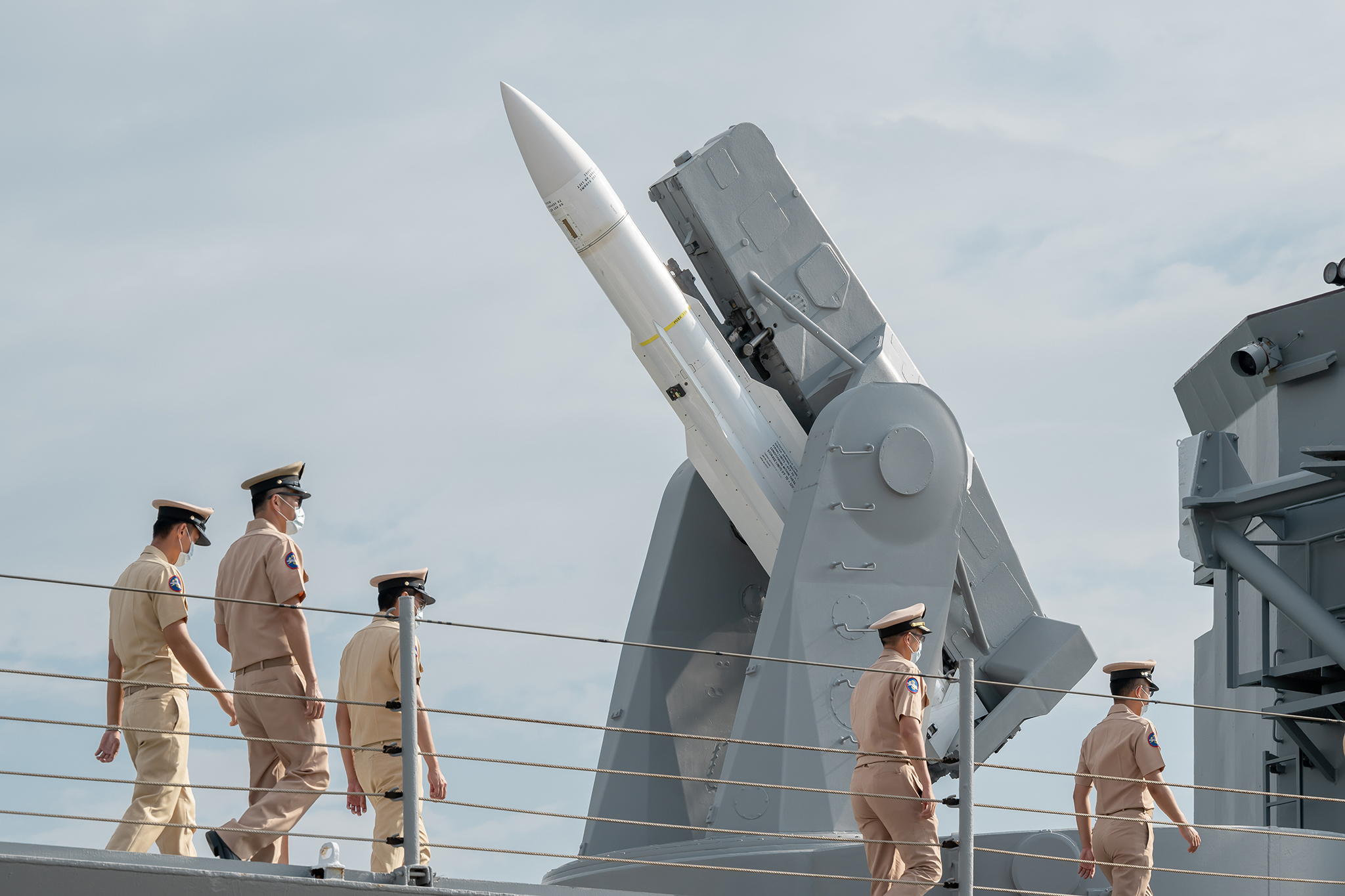
RIM-66 Standard on a Mark 13 missile launcher in Taiwanese service in 2022

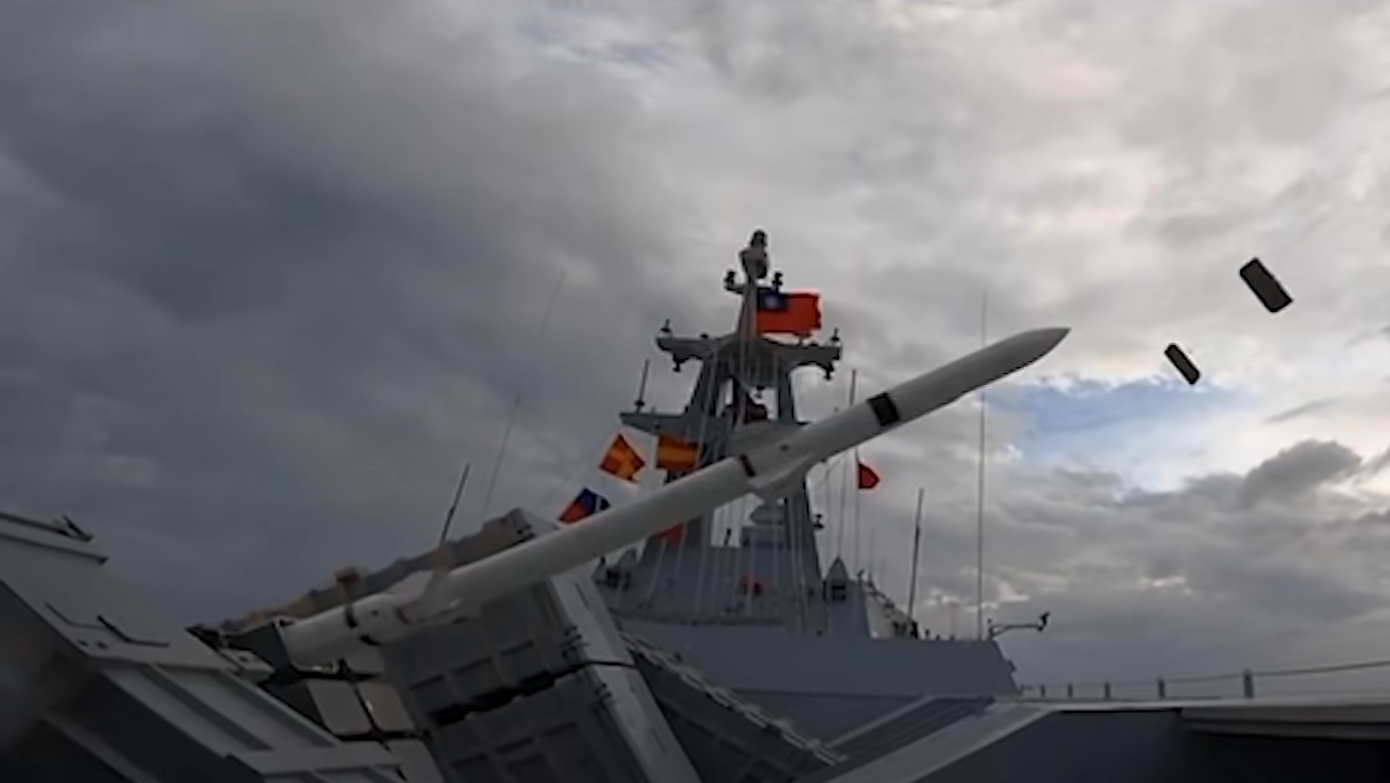
TC-2N fired from ROCS Ta Chiang

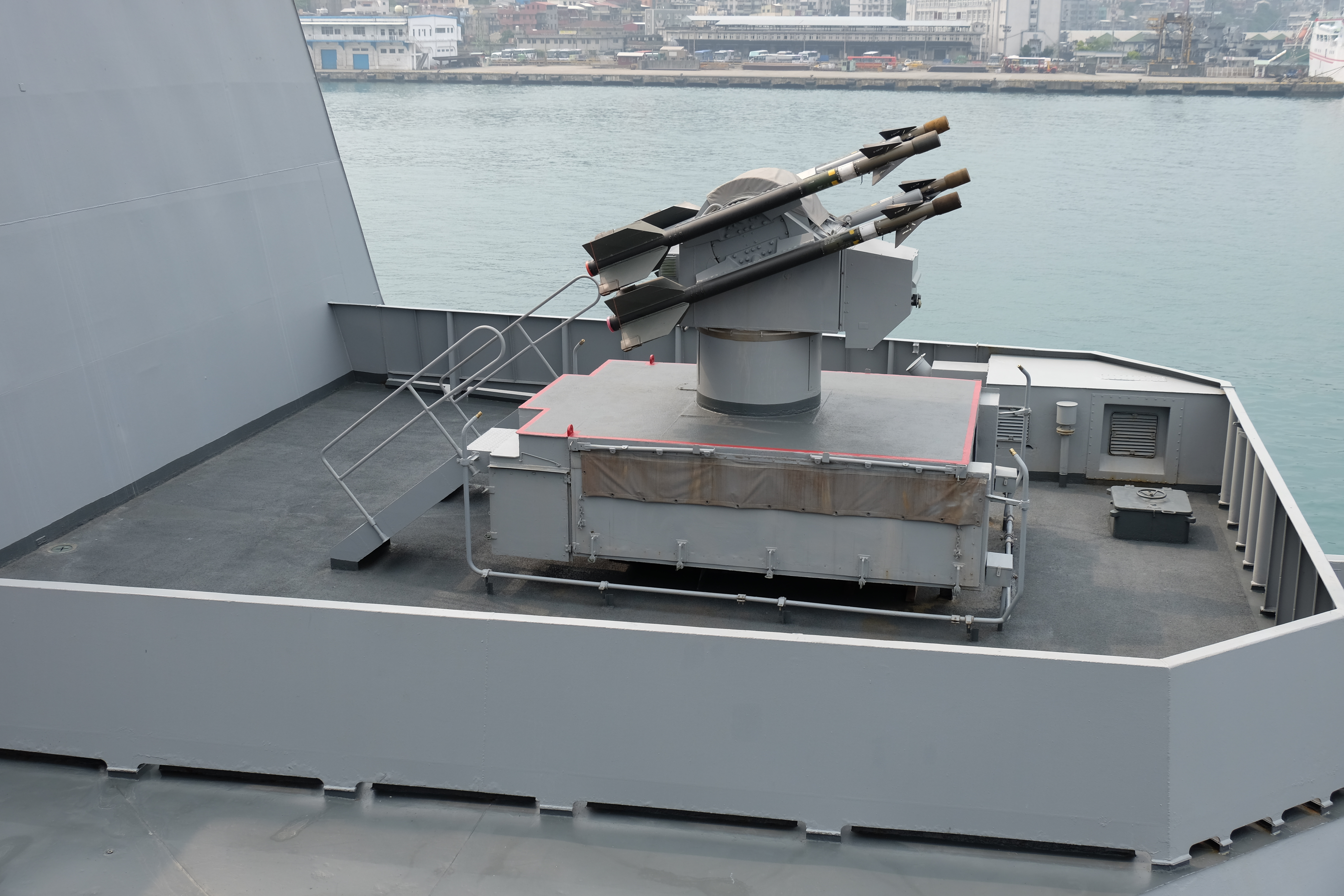
Sea Chaparral launcher mounted on ROCN Si Ning (PFG-1203)

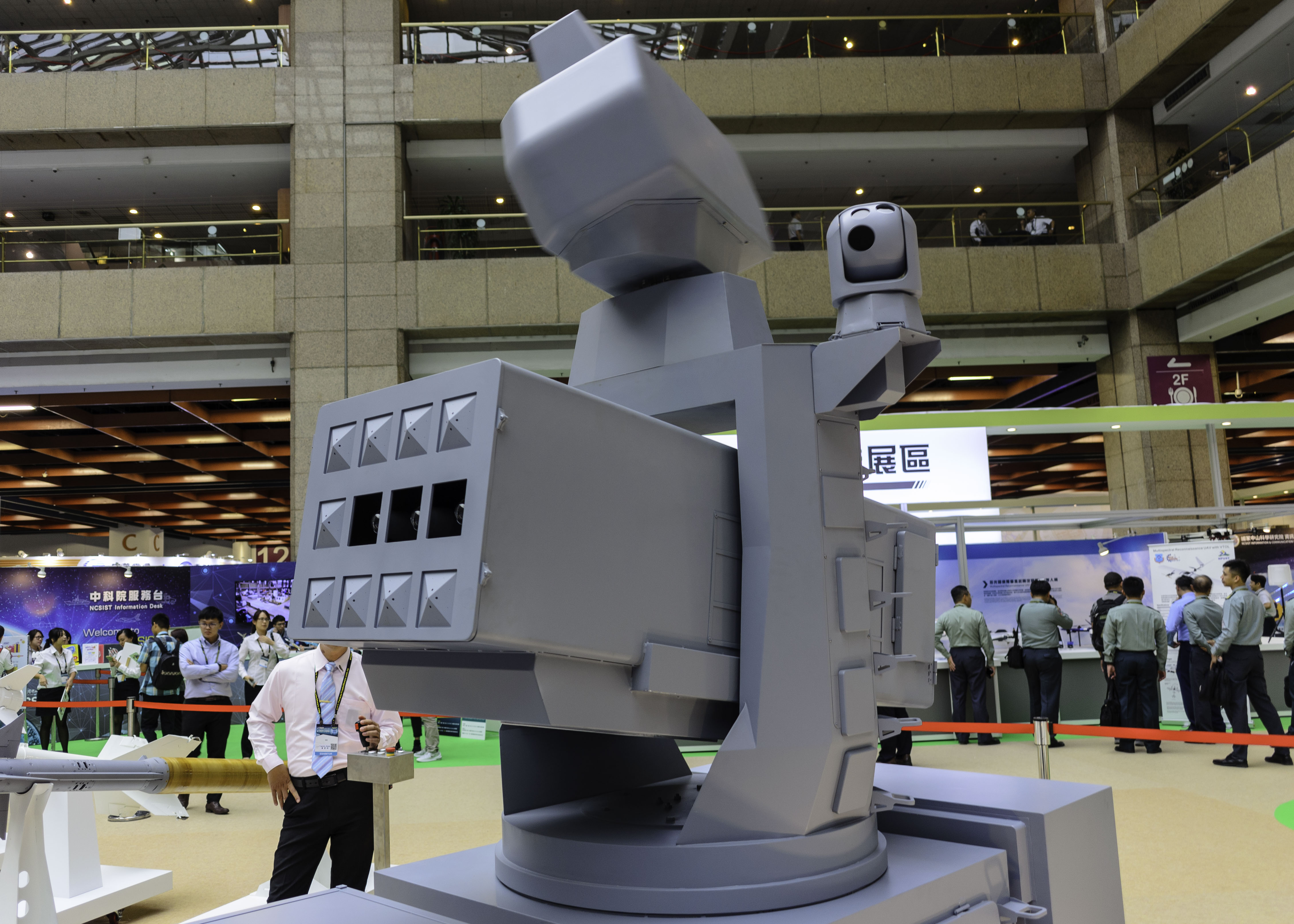
Sea Oryx missile launcher display at MND Hall 2019.

==== Anti-ship missiles ====
Name	Origin	Type	Notes
AGM-84 Harpoon	United States	Subsonic	(183) AGM-84s – (60) 84Ls
Hsiung Feng II	Taiwan	Subsonic	Unknown, in mass production with secondary ground attack capability
Hsiung Feng III	Taiwan	Supersonic	Unknown, in mass production with secondary ground attack capability

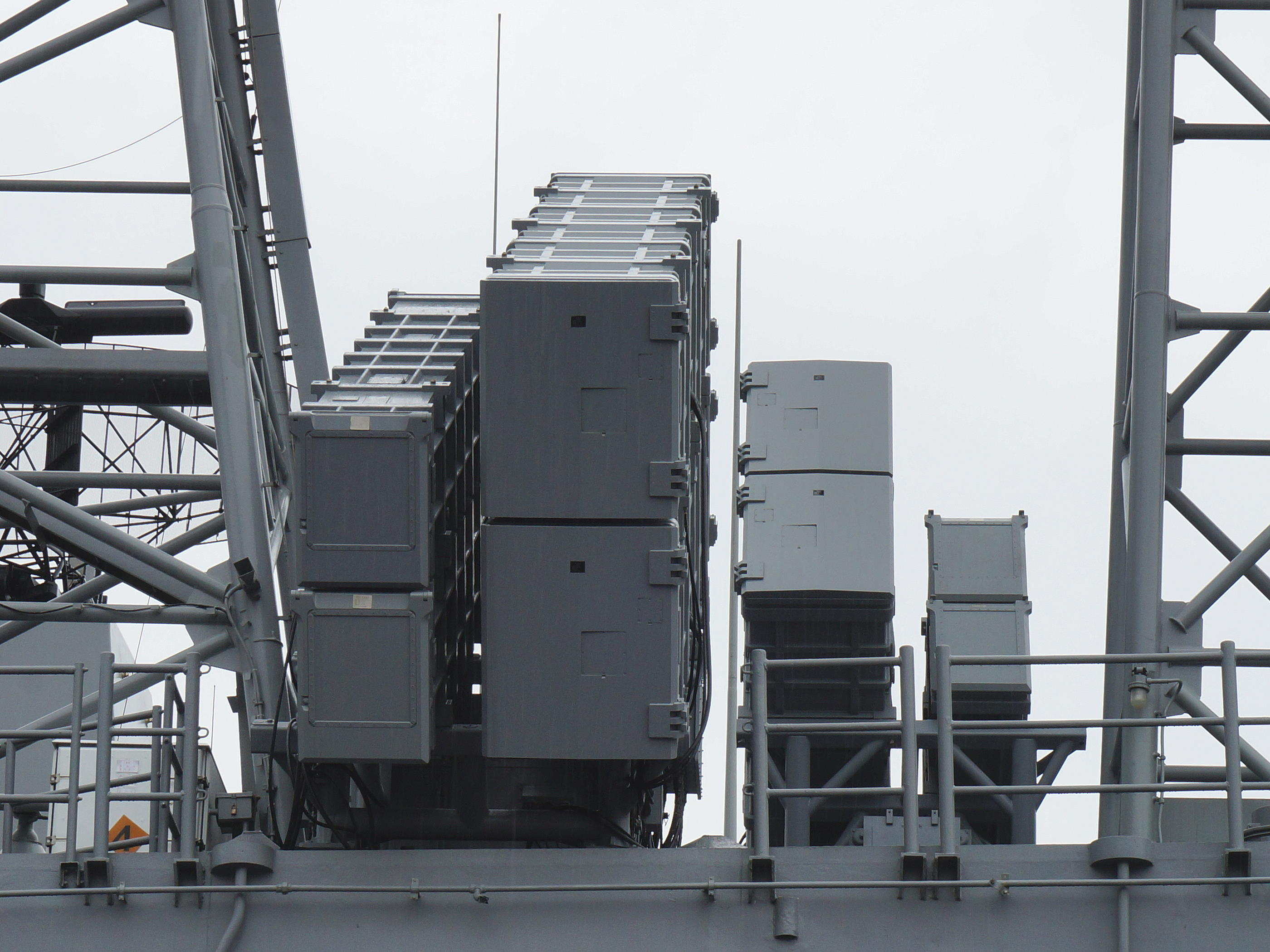
Hsiung Feng II and Hsiung Feng III launchers of Tian Dan (PFG2-1110)

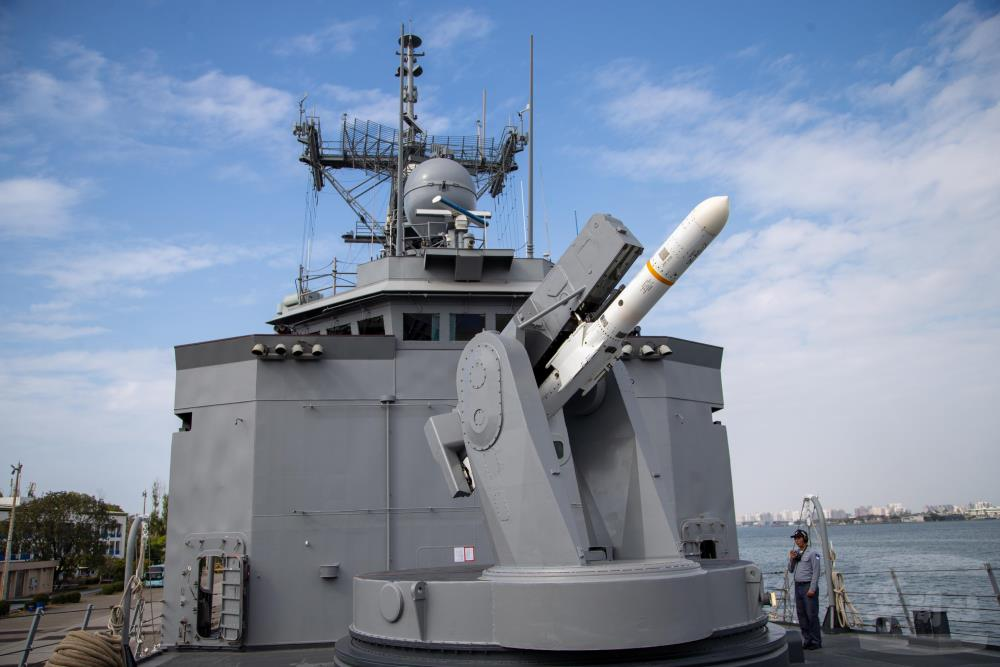
AGM-84L Harpoon on a Mark 13 missile launcher in Navy service in 2026

==== CIWS ====
Name	Origin	Type	Notes
Phalanx CIWS	United States	Gun System	20mm, 7 Mk-15 delivered in 1989, 6 Mk-15 delivered in 1996, 1 Mk15 delivered in 2014, 13 Mk15 delivered in 2016, 11 Mk15 delivered in 2018
Sea Oryx	Taiwan	Missile System	Short-range missile defence system available in a 24-round launcher using off-board sensors, or an autonomous 12-round launcher with its own radar and EO/IR sensor. The system can be truck-mounted or mounted on a warship.
XTR-101/102	Taiwan	Gun System	20mm, automatic close-defense remote weapon systems, more than 20 systems deployed in coastal defenses.

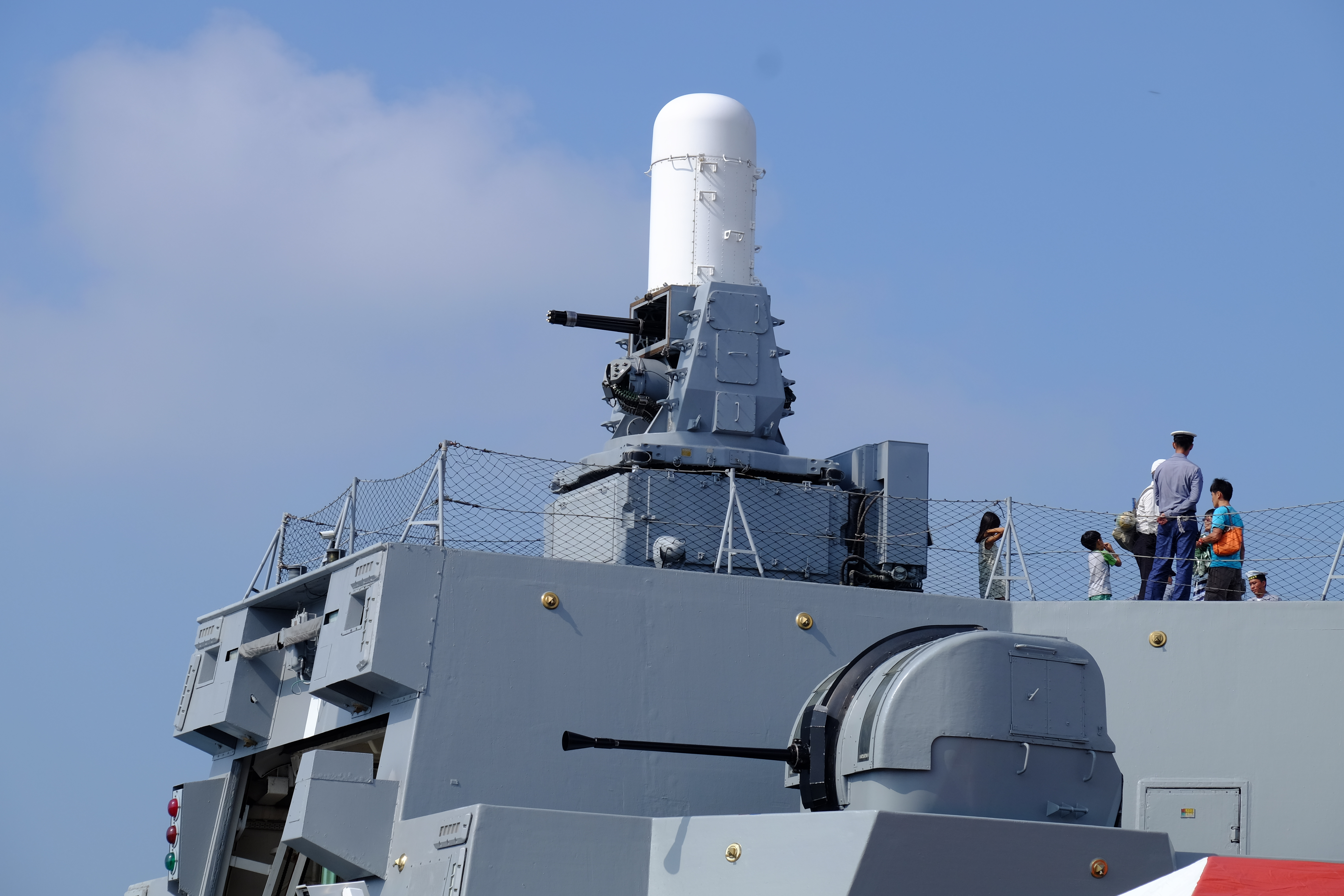
Phalanx CIWS and Bofors 40 mm L/70 gun aboard on ROCN Di Hua (PFG-1206)

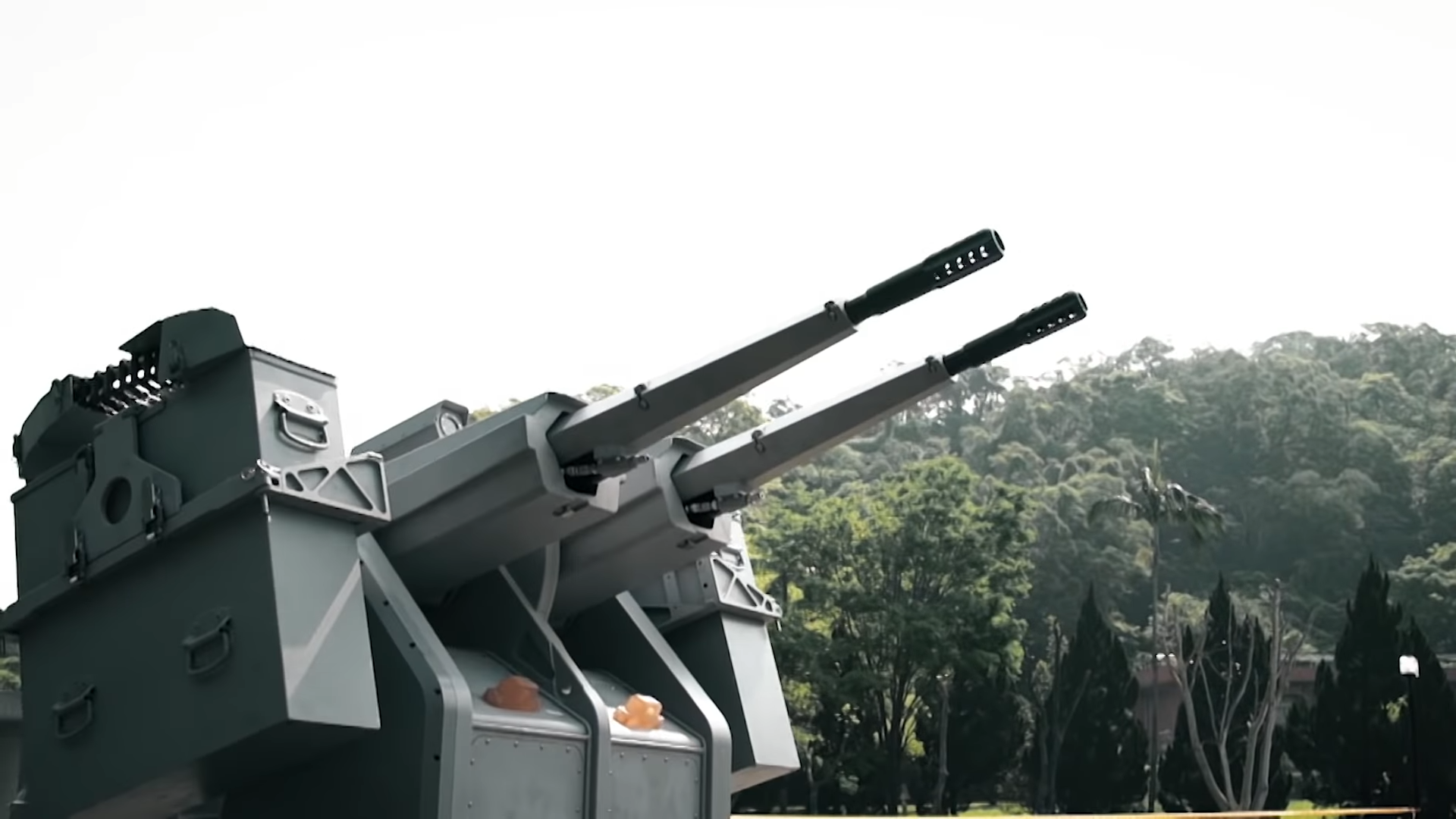
XTR-102 automatic close-defense 20mm remote weapon systems

==== Torpedoes ====
Name	Origin	Type	Notes
Mark 46 torpedo	United States	Lightweight	100 delivered in 1992, 150 Mk-46 Mod-5 NEARTIP delivered in 1994, 110 Mk-46 Mod-5 NEARTIP delivered in 1998, 90 Mk-46 Mod-5 NEARTIP delivered in 2000, 41 Mk-46 Mod-5 NEARTIP delivered in 2001
Mark 54 lightweight torpedo	United States	Lightweight	168 delivered in 2017.
Mark 48 torpedo	United States	Heavyweight	46 ordered in 2018
SUT torpedo	Germany	Heavyweight	multirole, 200 delivered in 1998 from Indonesian production line

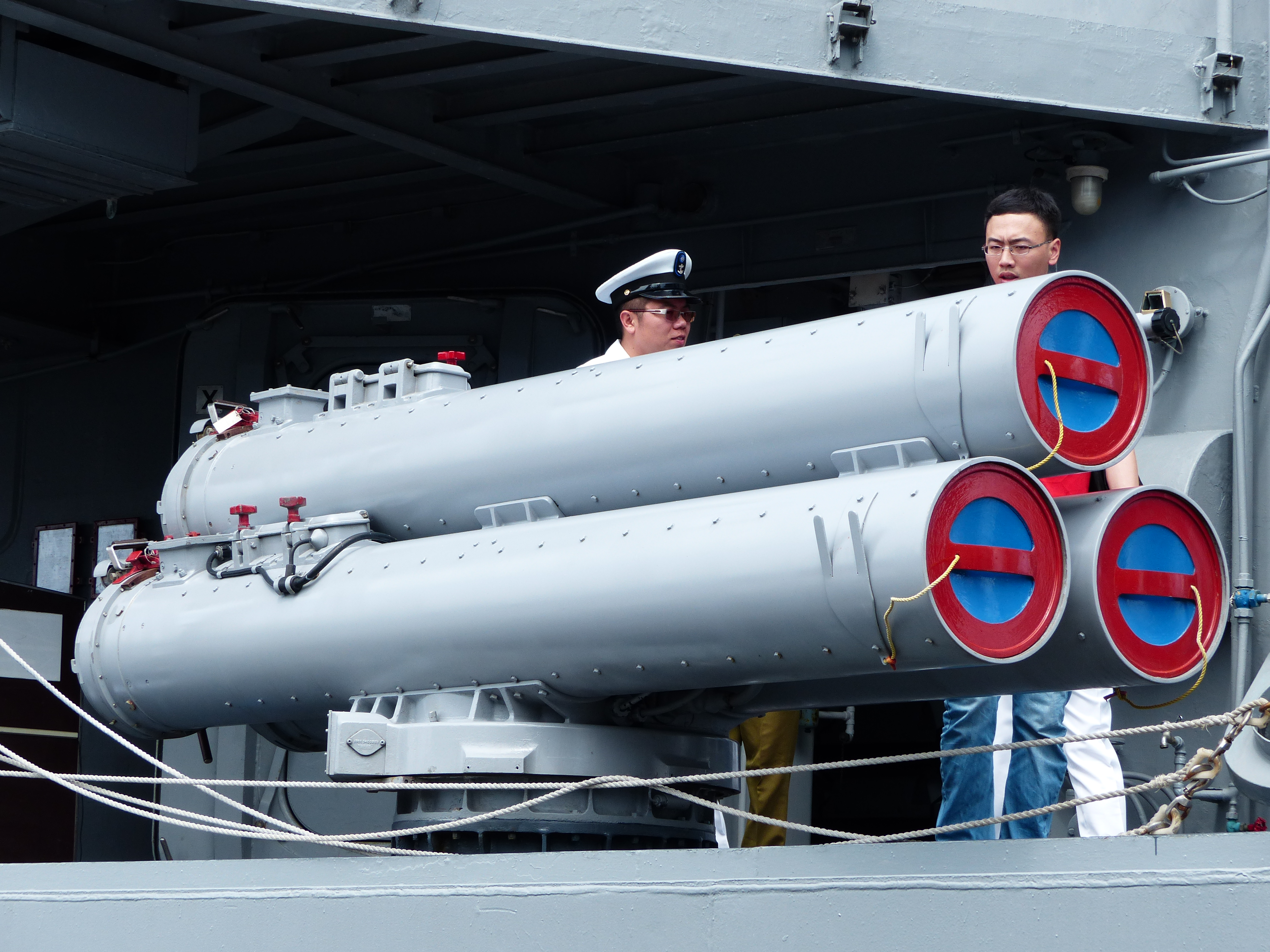
Mark 32 torpedo tubes mounted on ROCN Tzu I (PFG-1107)

==== Other weapons ====
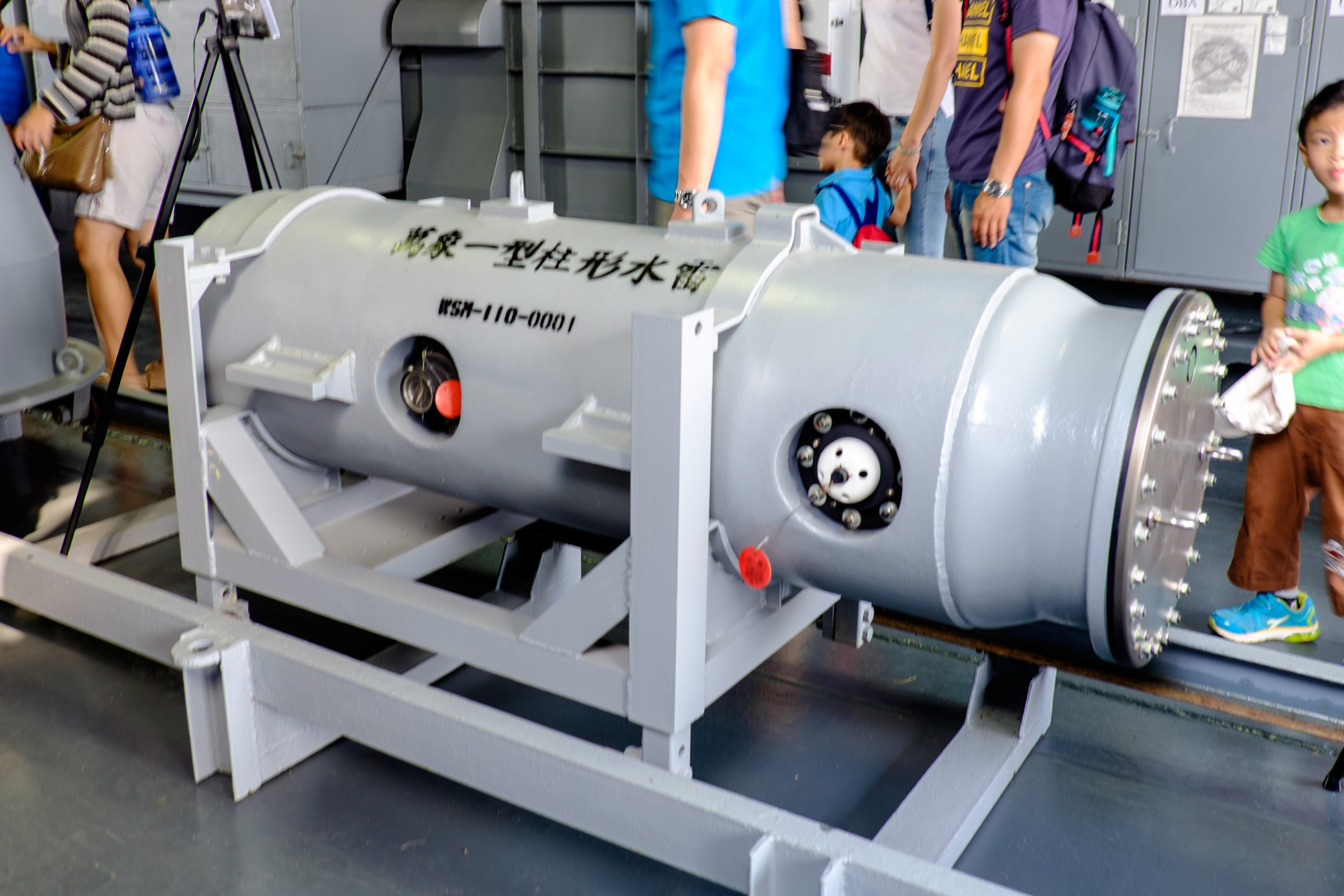
No.1 Wan Xiang CAPTOR mine displayed aboard ROCN Ho Zhong (LCU-484)

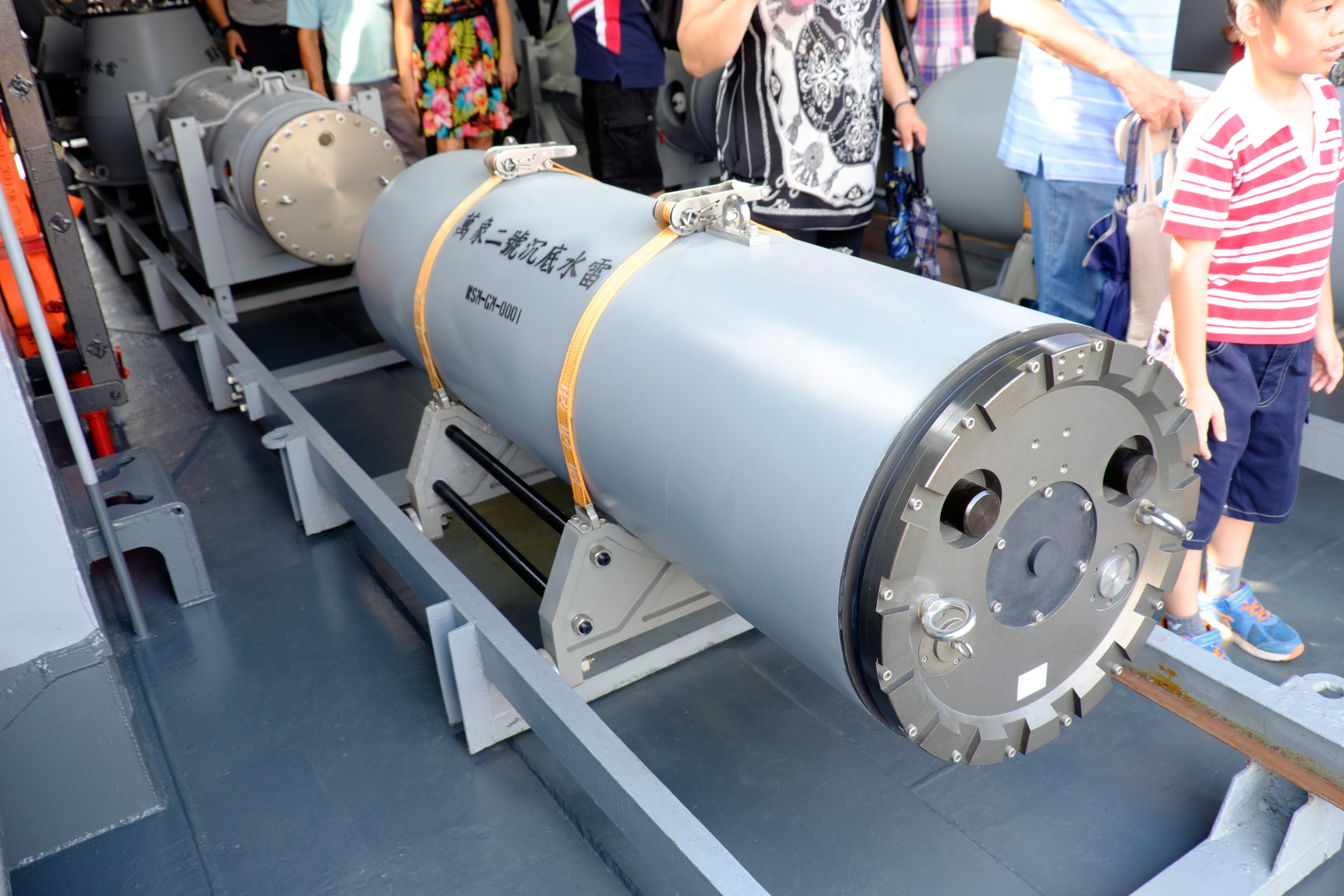
No.2 Wan Xiang Bottom mine displayed aboard ROCN Ho Zhong (LCU-484)

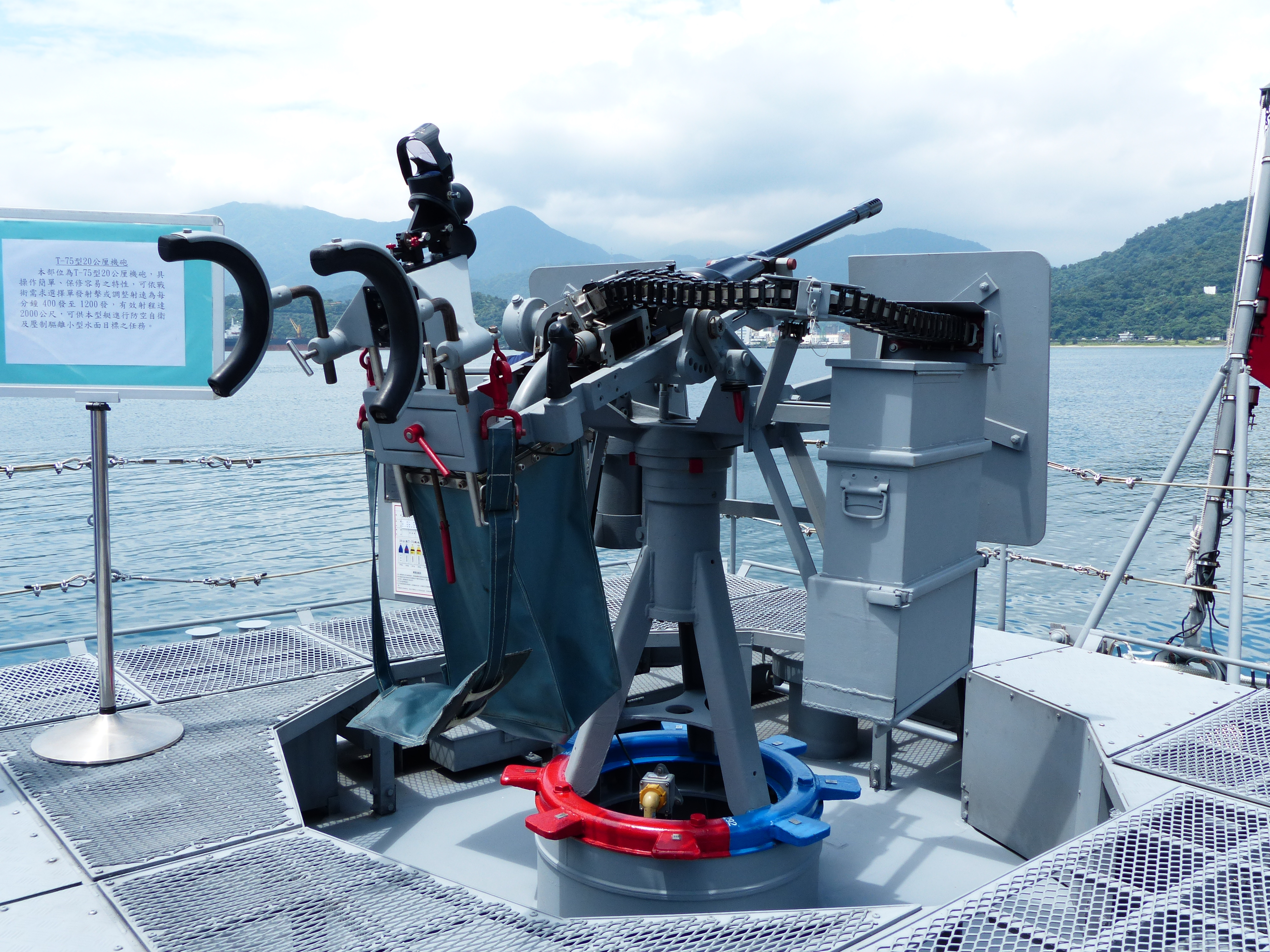
T-75S 20mm Cannon mounted on ROCS FACG-77

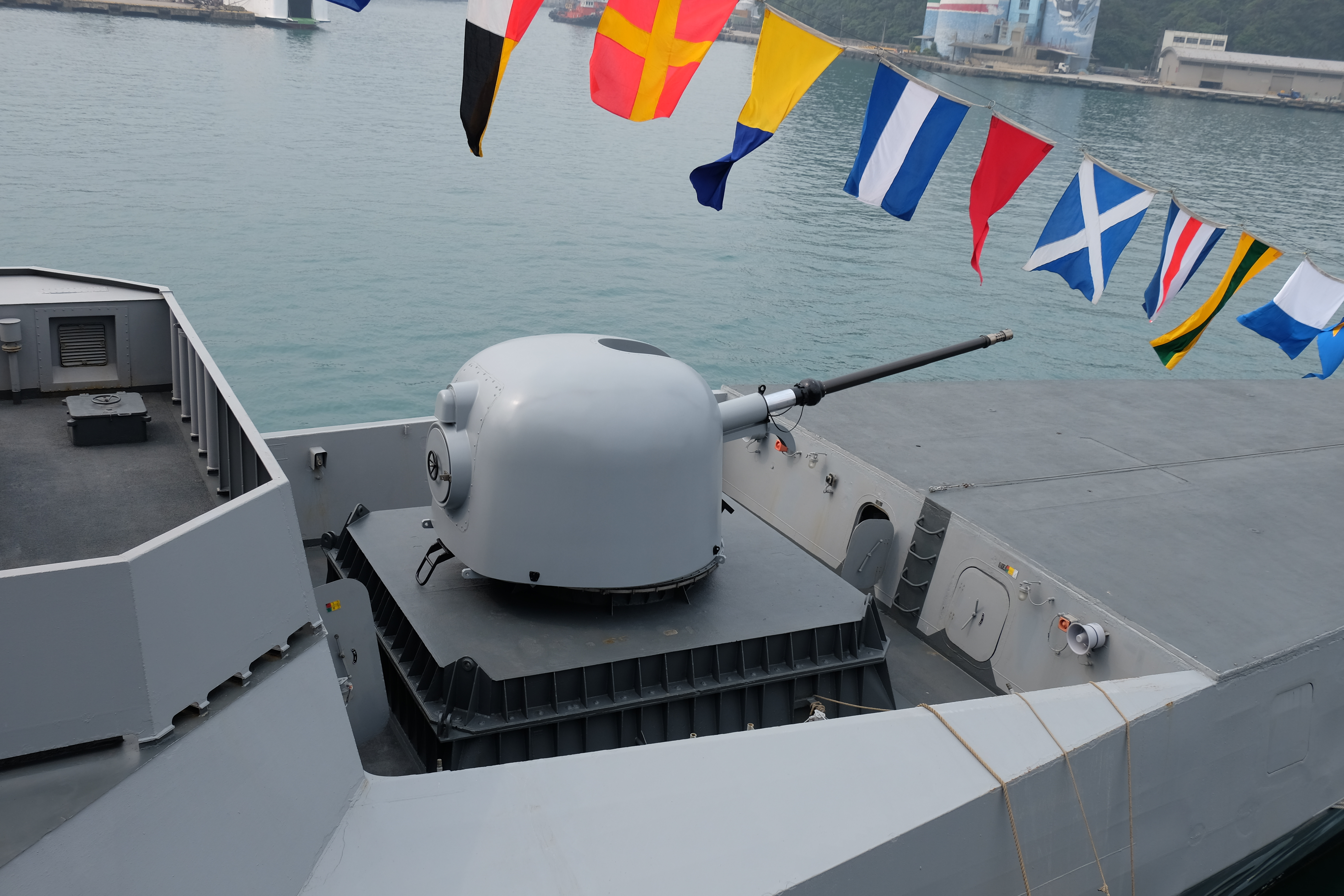
OTO Melara 76mm gun aboard the frigate ROCN Si Ning (PFG-1203)

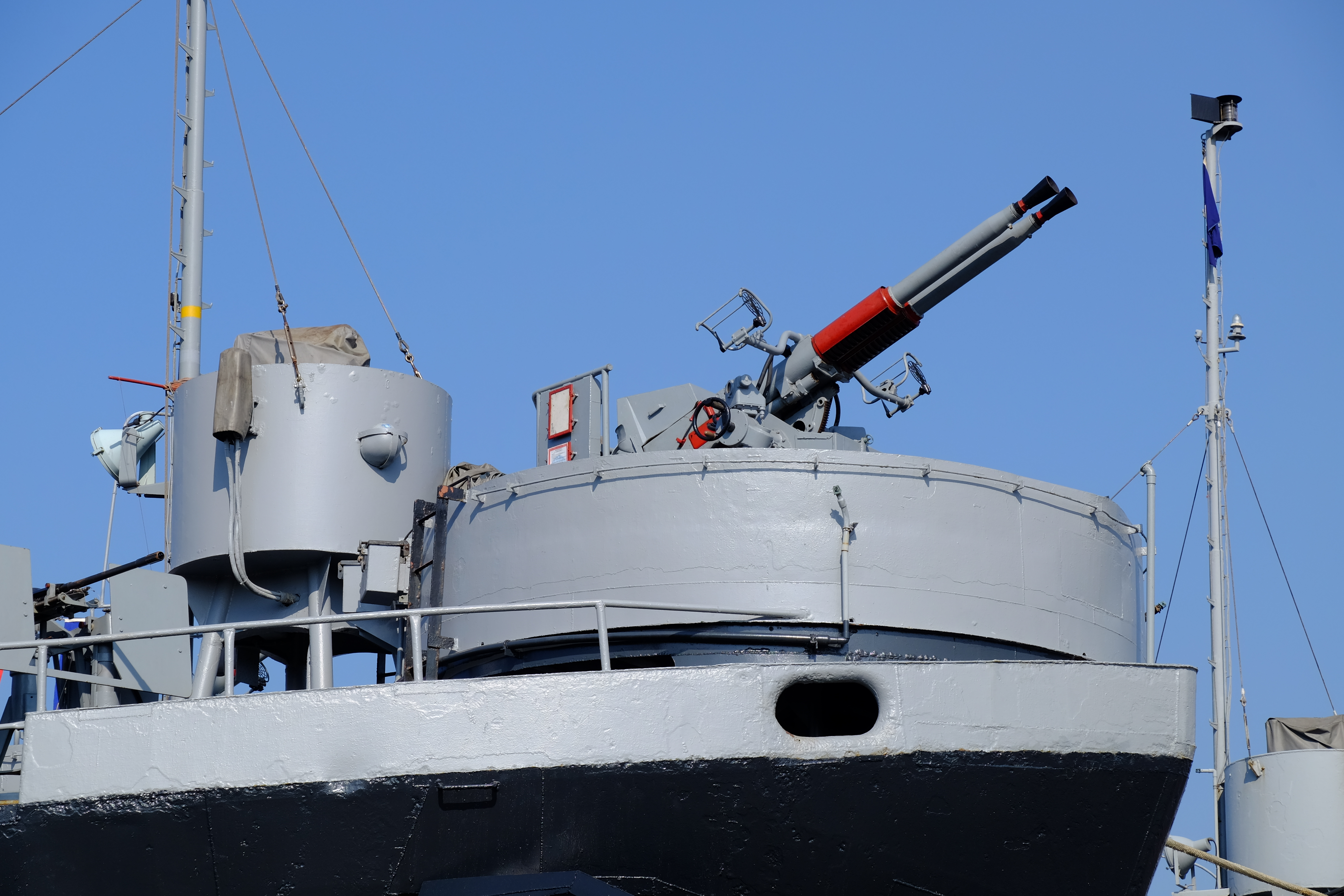
Bofors 40mm twin gun mount

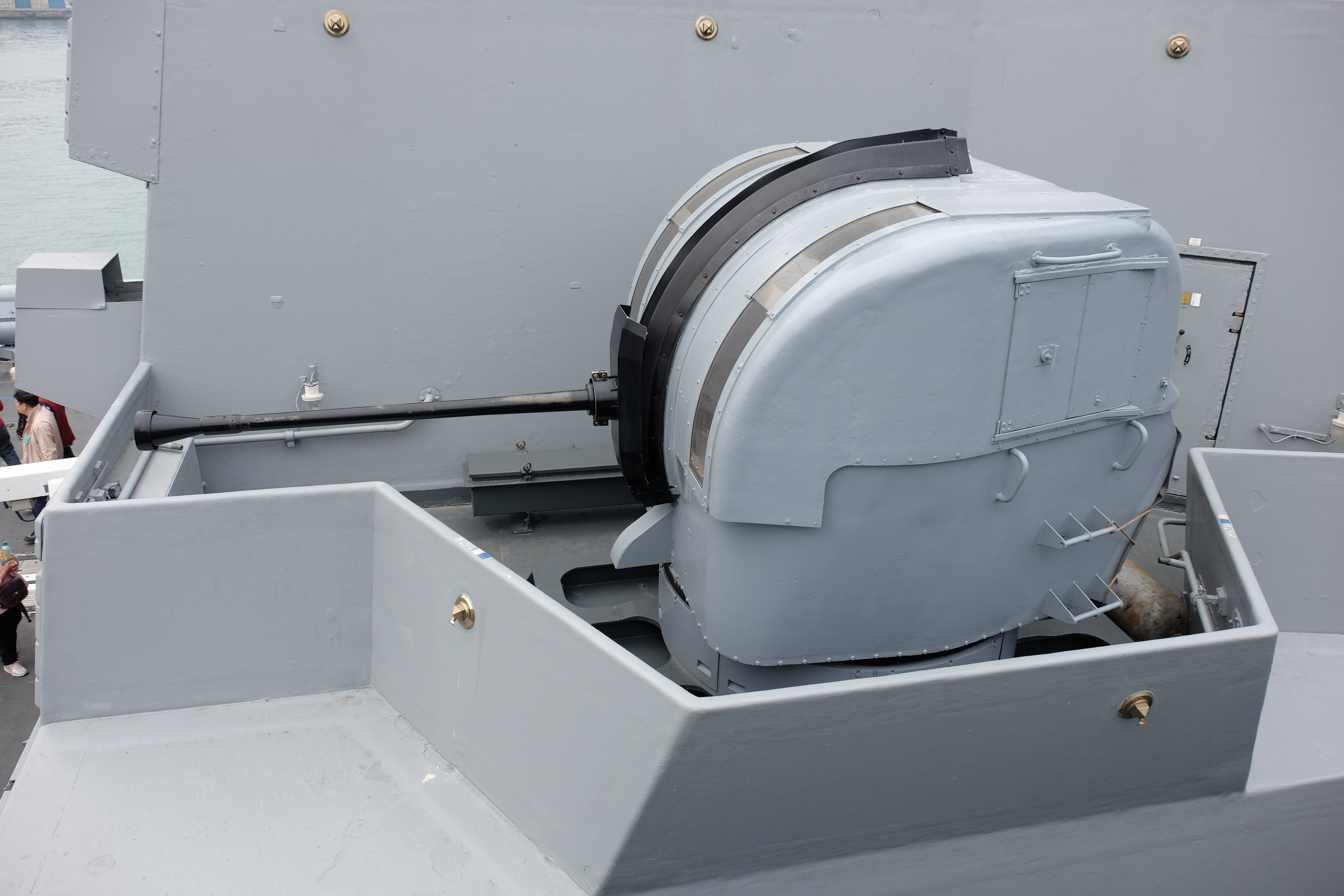
Bofors 40mm L70 gun

===== Retired =====
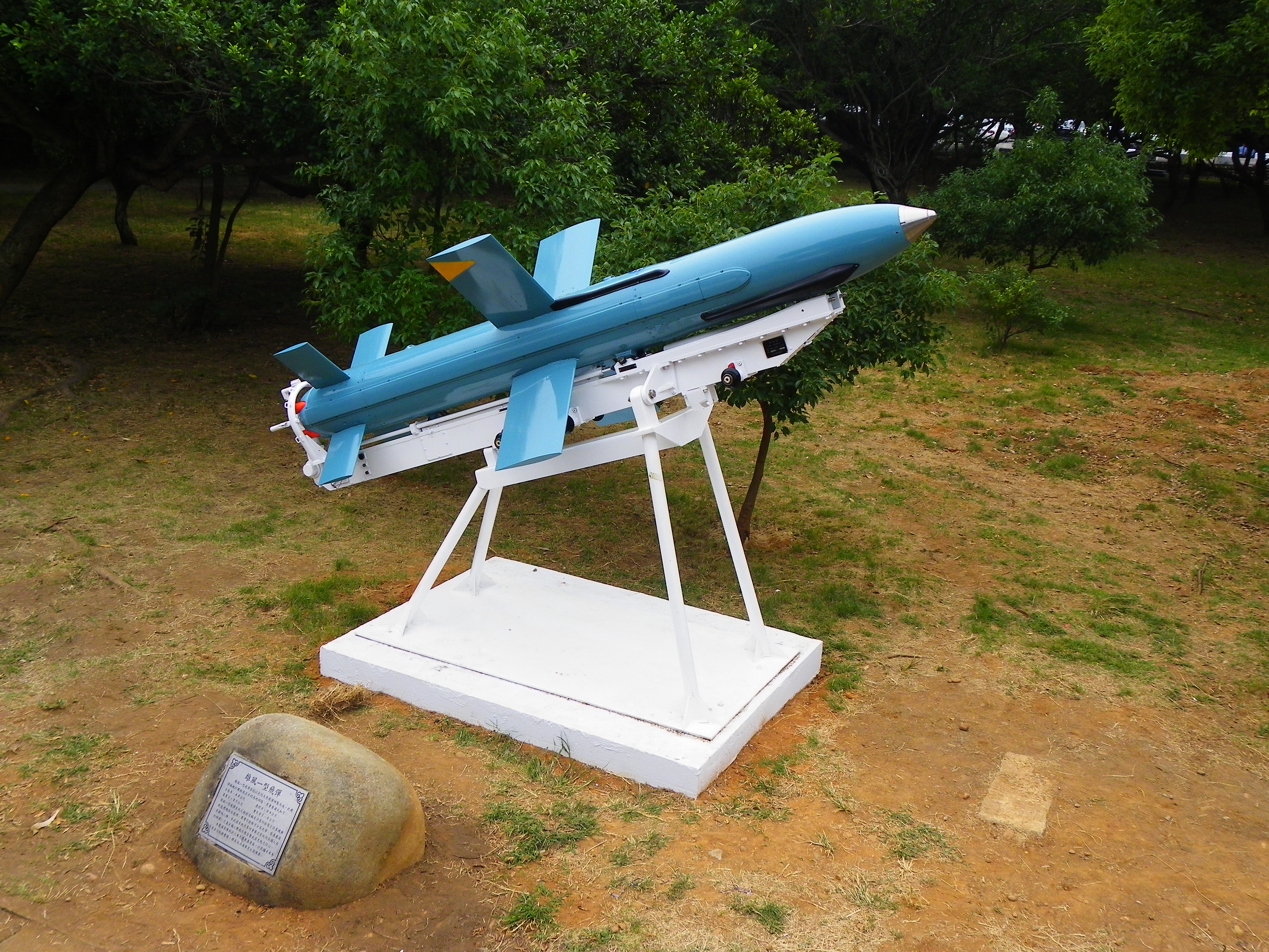
Hsiung Feng I Anti-ship Missile

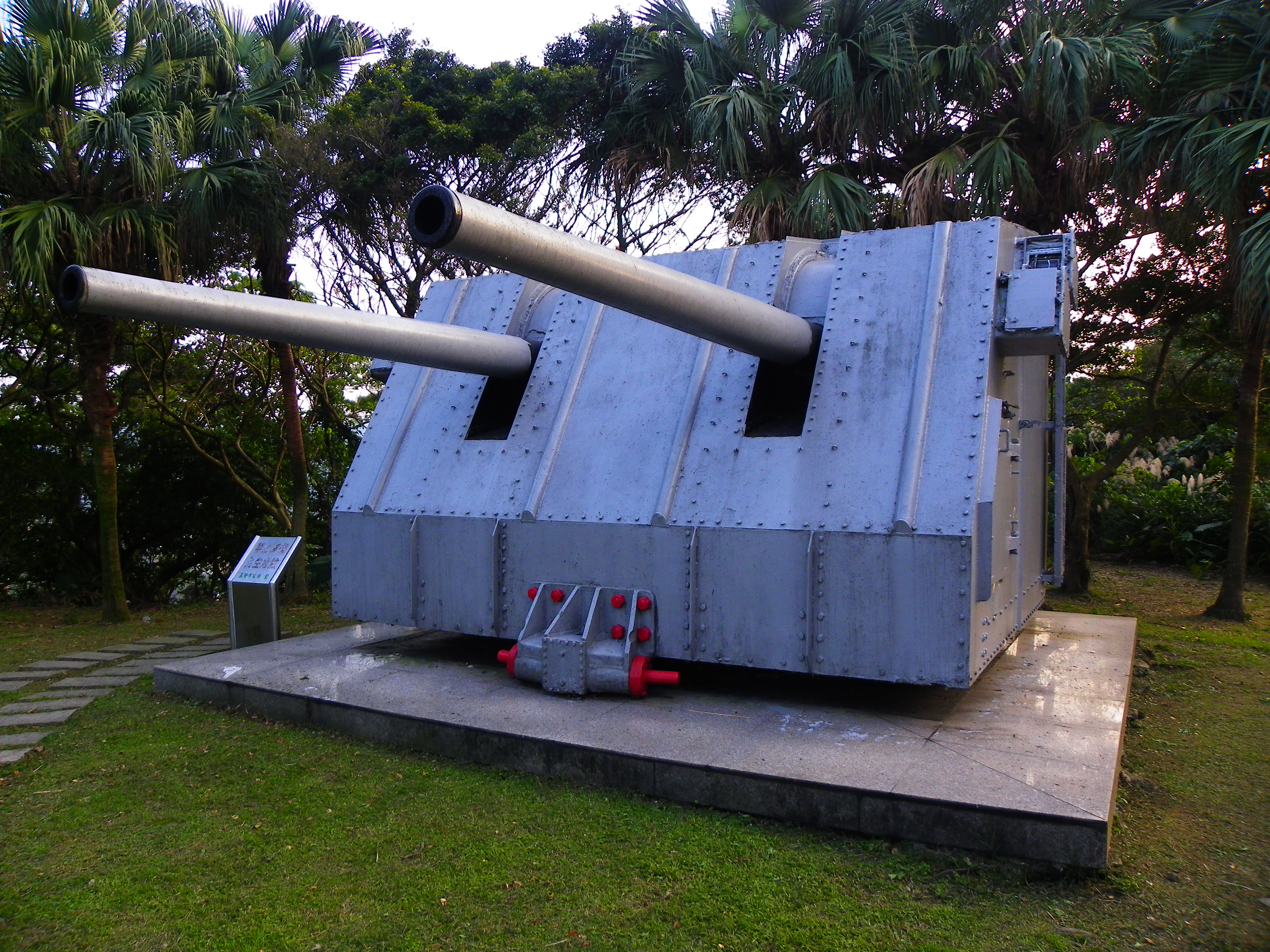
Mk38 Mod0 5 Inch Twin Guns

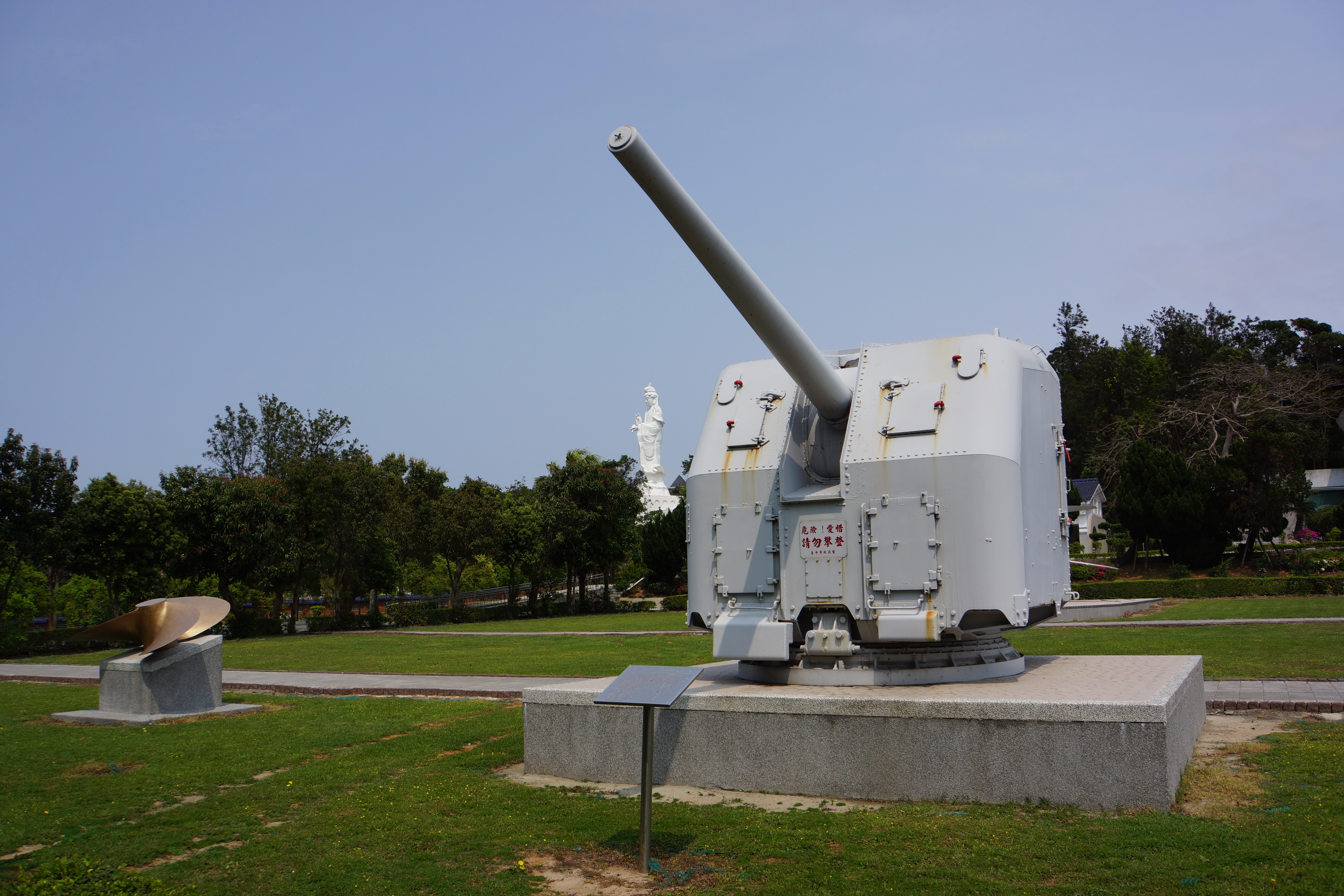
Single 5 inch gun

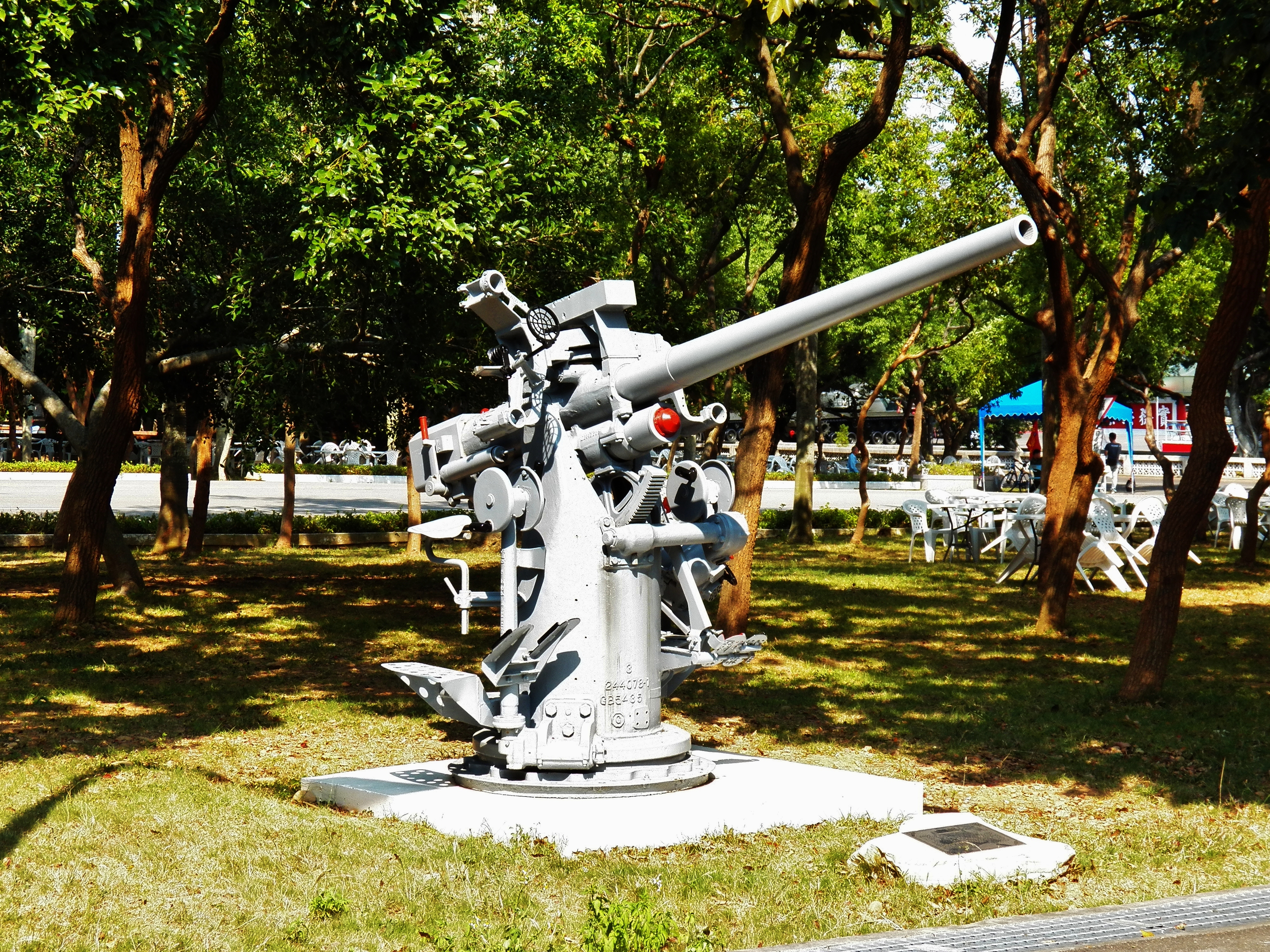
3 Inch 50 Caliber Anti-Aircraft Gun

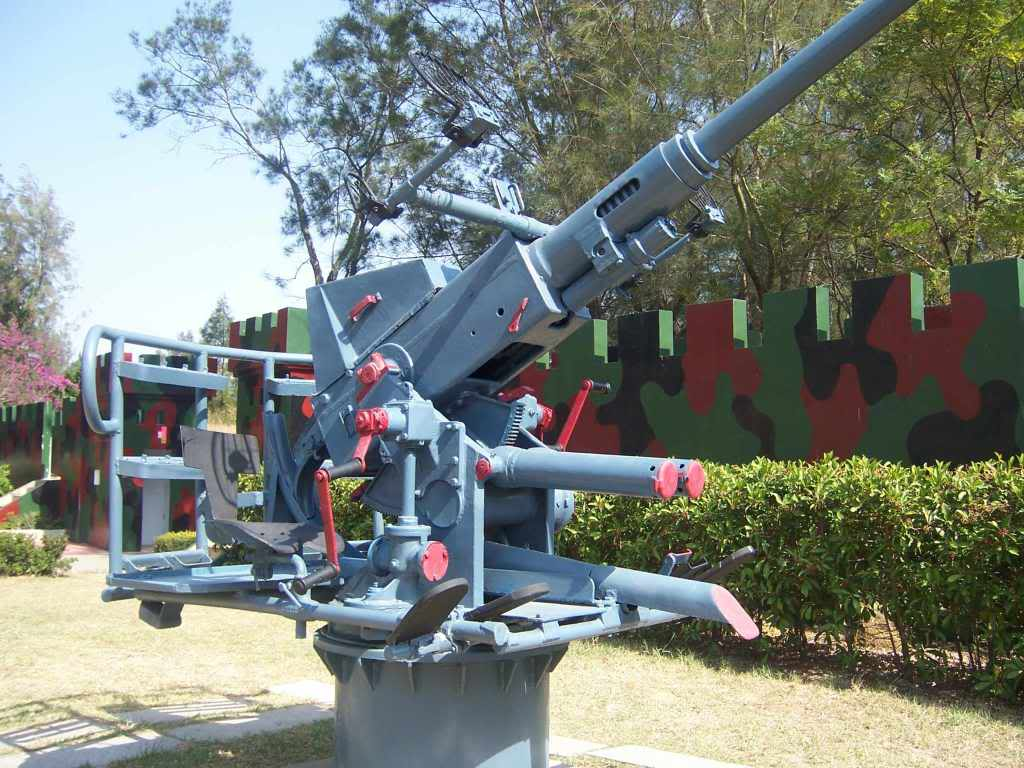
Bofors 40mm single gun mount

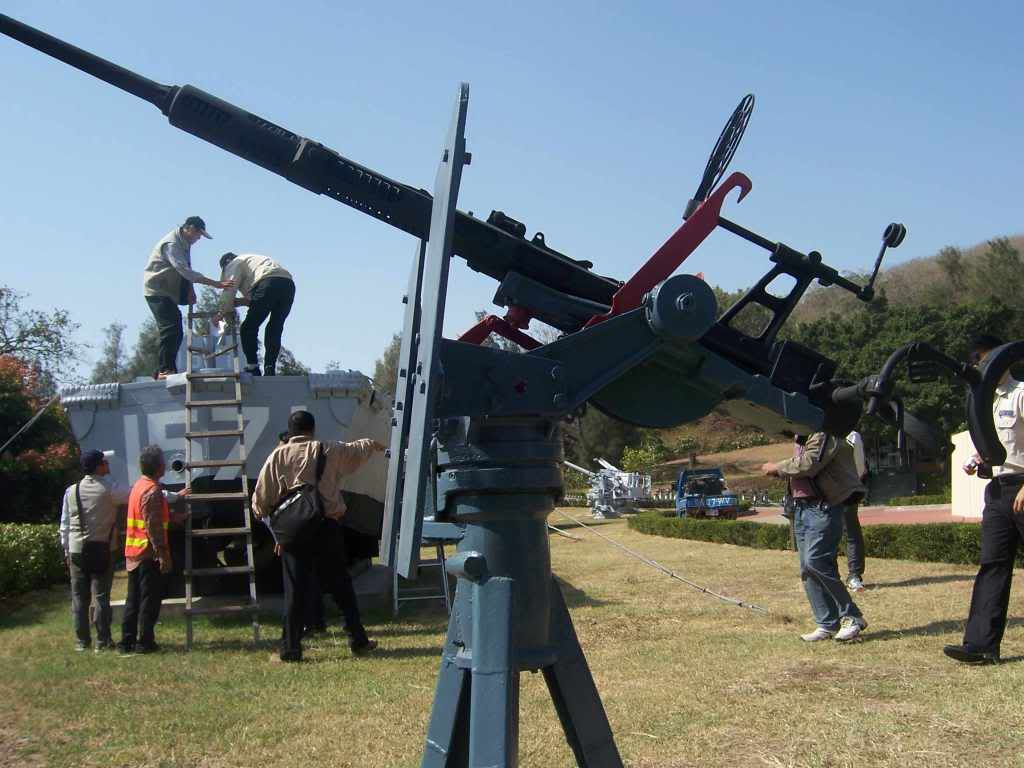
20mm single gun mount

== See also ==
- Defense industry of Taiwan
- Maritime industries of Taiwan
- List of equipment of the Republic of China Air Force
- List of equipment of the Republic of China Army
