= CSBC Endeavor Manta =

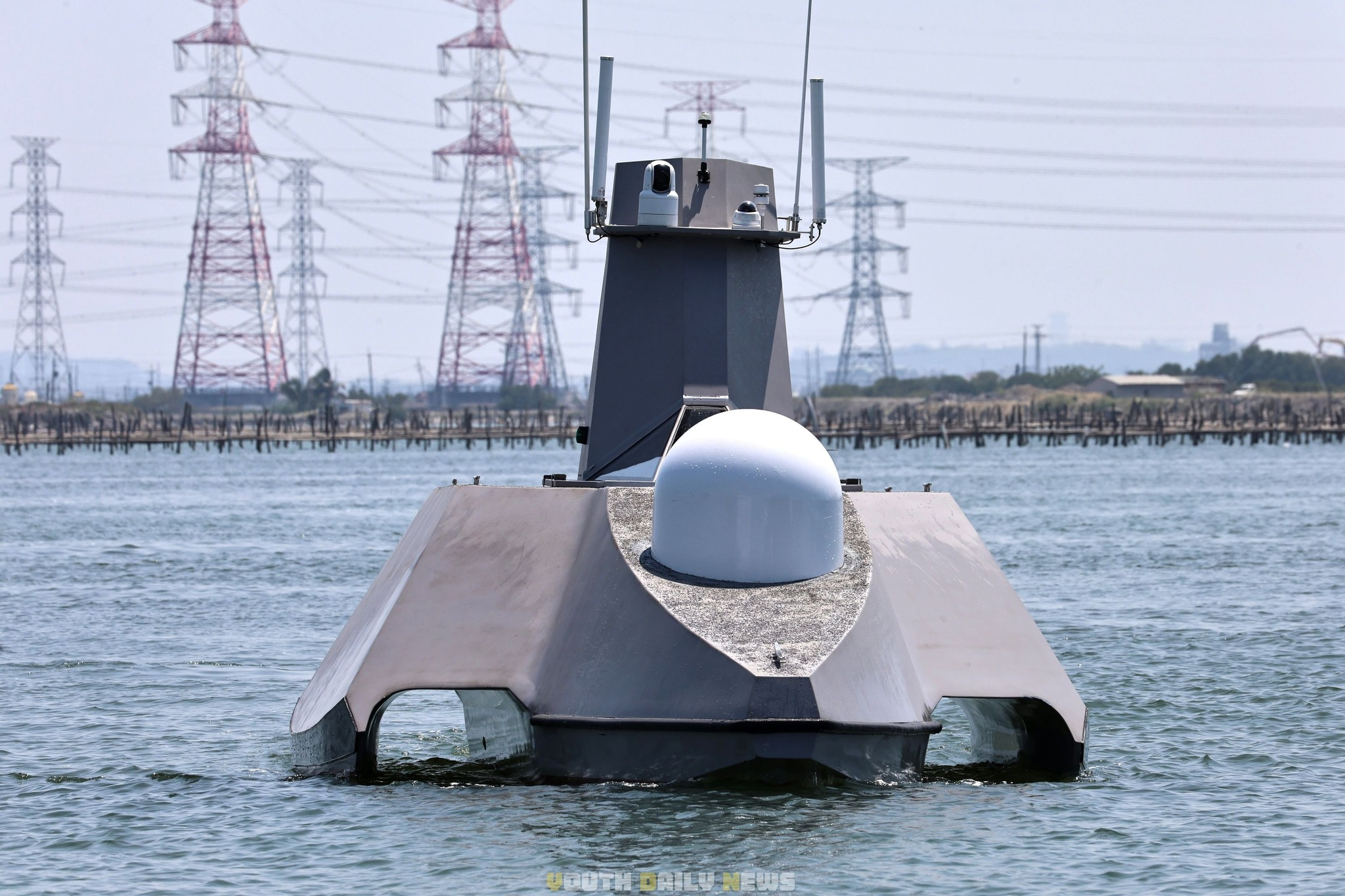

The CSBC Endeavor Manta (奮進魔鬼魚號) is an uncrewed surface vehicle (USV) produced by CSBC Corporation, Taiwan. It is 8.6 meters long and 3.7 meters wide. It has a top speed of ~65 kilometers per hour and a payload of a little over a ton.

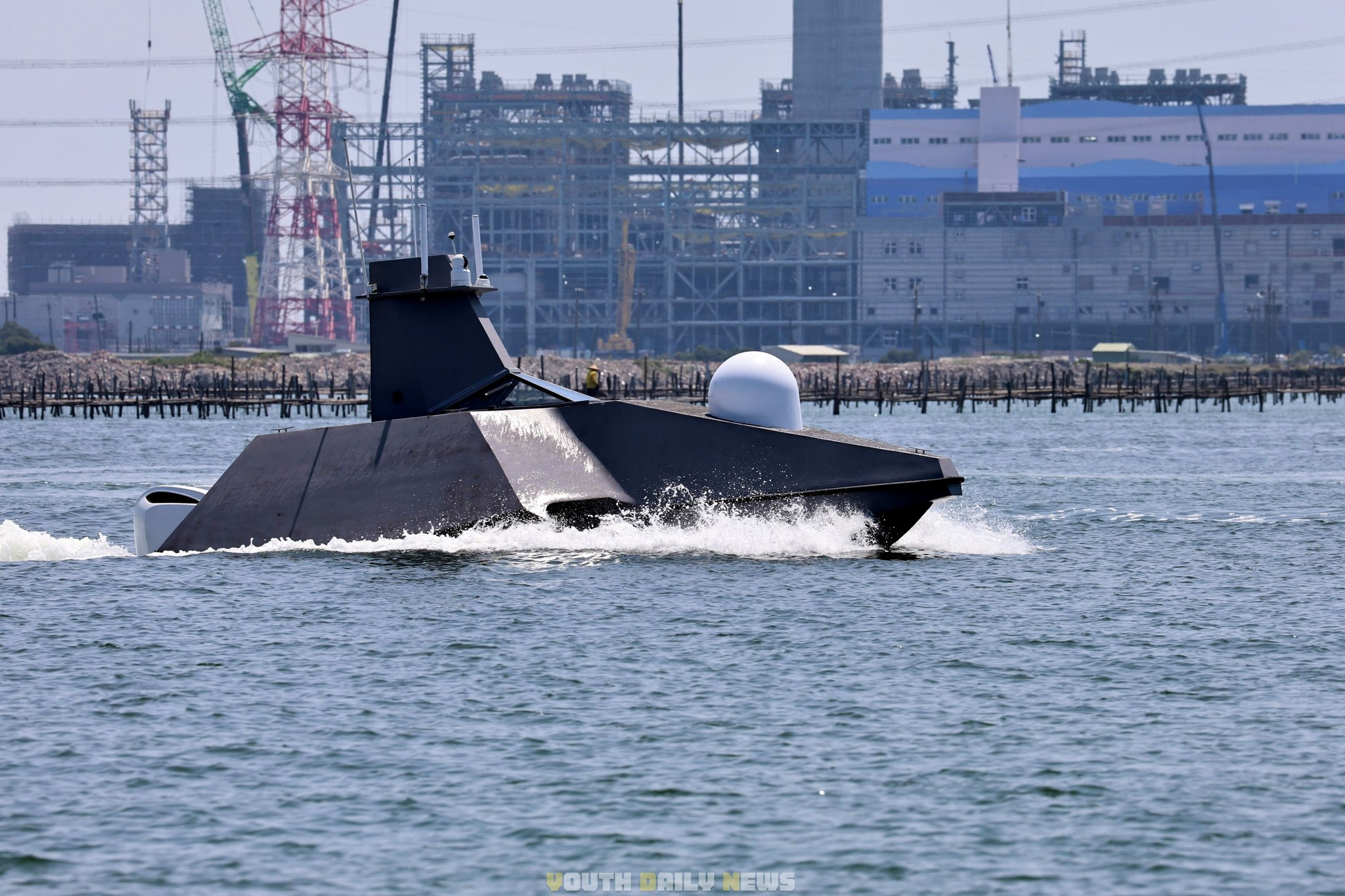

The Endeavor Manta has a trimaran hull for increased stability. It can carry an internal explosive payload as well as light torpedoes externally. Up to 50 USVs can be controlled from a remote control station. Its small size allows it to be launched from a large number of locations.

== History ==
Taiwan's pursuit of USVs was largely driven by their use in the Russo-Ukrainian War and a growing invasion threat to Taiwan from China.

According to CSBC the program began in early 2024. The program was revealed in late 2024 with an official demonstration planned for early 2025.

The system was publicly unveiled in March 2025. The Endeavor Manta was certified by the American Bureau of Shipping in September 2025.

== See also ==
- Hui Long-class UUV
- Defense industry of Taiwan
- Maritime industries of Taiwan
- NCSIST Kuai Chi
