= NCSIST Kuai Chi =

- Type: Unmanned surface vehicle
- Place of origin: Taiwan

Production history
- Designer: National Chung-Shan Institute of Science and Technology

The Kuai Chi (Chinese: 快奇無人艇) is an unmanned surface vehicle produced by the Taiwanese National Chung-Shan Institute of Science and Technology (NCSIST).

== History ==
The development of the Kuai Chi was considered especially sensitive with few details released.

In April 2025 a Kuai Chi was spotted undergoing testing off Suao Township.

The Kuai Chi was tested at the Jiupeng Military Base in August 2025.

In August 2025, Taiwan decided to purchase 1,320 Kuai Chi maritime drones, with deliveries over five years.

The Kuai Chi was displayed at the 2025 Taipei Aerospace & Defense Technology Exhibition (TADTE).

Mass production of the Kuai Chi is scheduled to begin in 2026.

== Design ==
The Kuai Chi has a displacement of approximately 3 tons and a top speed of greater than 40 knots. It is designed to be transportable within a 40ft shipping container.

The Kuai Chi is designed to be armed with NCSIST Ching Feng I FPV suicide drones and receive targeting information from the NCSIST Albatross II. The vessel itself can also be equipped with a large warhead for use in an impact attack role.

== See also ==
- CSBC Endeavor Manta
- Hui Long-class UUV
- Sea Baby
- MAGURA V5
