= El Al =

National airline of Israel

El Al Israel Airlines Ltd. אל על נתיבי אוויר לישראל בע״מ شركة طيران العال الإسرائيلية المحدودة

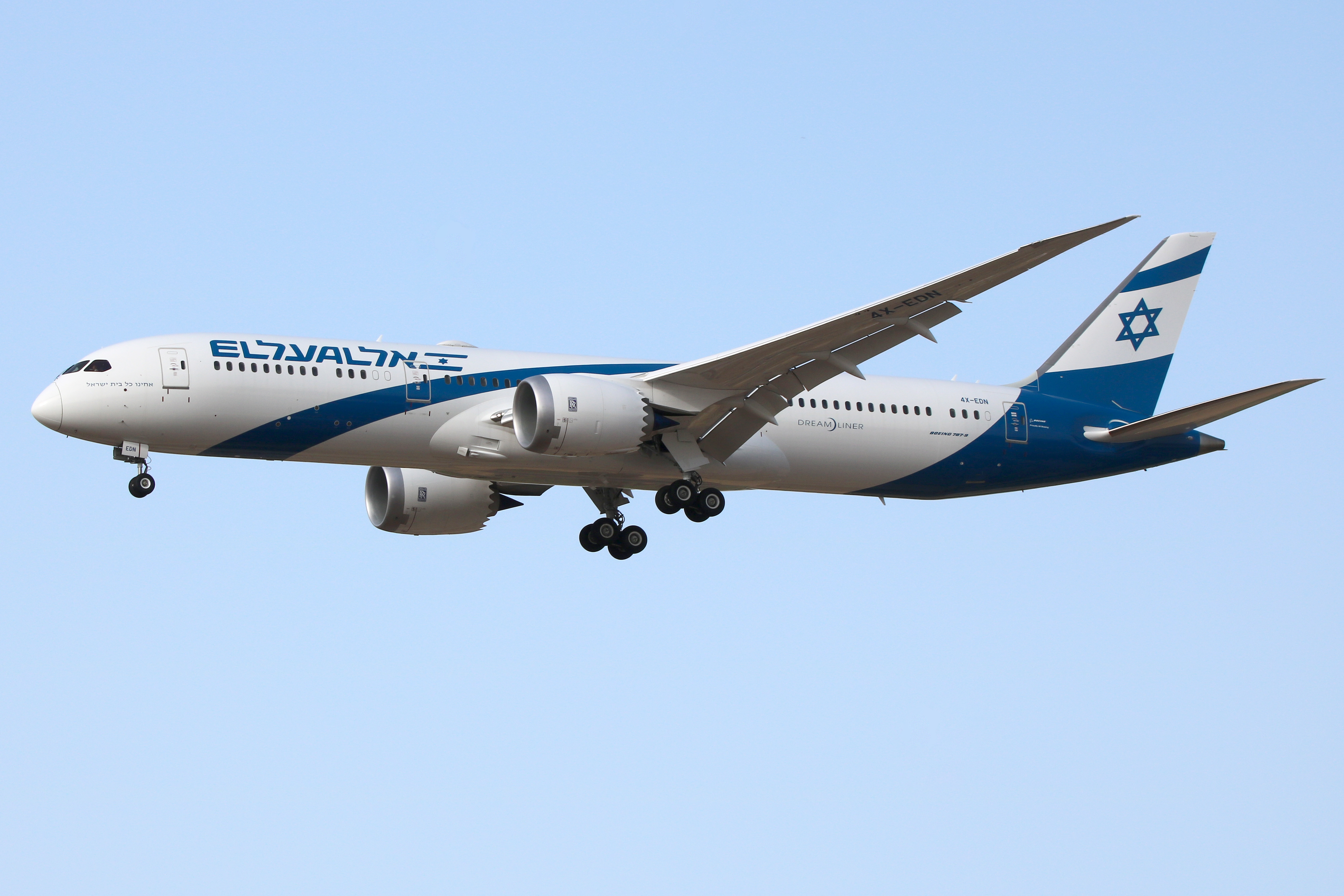
- An El Al Boeing 787-9
IATA	ICAO	Call sign
LY	ELY	ELAL
- Founded: 1948; 78 years ago
- Hubs: Ben Gurion Airport
- Frequent-flyer program: Matmid Guest
- Subsidiaries: El Al Cargo; Sundor
- Fleet size: 47
- Destinations: 49
- Traded as: TASE: ELAL
- Headquarters: Ben Gurion Airport, Israel
- Key people: Amikam Ben Zvi (Chairman); Levi HaLevi (CEO); Omry Cohen (COO)
- Employees: 3,027 full-time, 1,583 part-time
- Website: elal.com

El Al Israel Airlines Ltd. (Hebrew: אל על נתיבי אוויר לישראל בע״מ; ) trading as El Al (Hebrew: אל על, "Upwards", "To the Skies", or "Skywards", stylized as ELעלALאל; Arabic: إل-عال) is the flag carrier of the State of Israel. Since its inaugural flight from Geneva to Tel Aviv in September 1948, the airline has grown to serve almost 50 destinations, operating scheduled domestic and international services and cargo flights within Israel, and to Europe, the Middle East, the Americas, Africa, and the Far East, from its main base in Ben Gurion Airport.

Although it has been the target of many attempted hijackings and terror attacks, there has only been one El Al flight hijacking in history, which ended without any loss of life. As Israel's national airline, El Al has played an important role in humanitarian rescue efforts, airlifting Jews from other countries to Israel, setting the world record for the most passengers on a commercial aircraft (single plane record of 1,088 passengers on a Boeing 747) by Operation Solomon when 14,500 Jewish refugees were transported from Ethiopia in 1991.

In 2012, El Al operated an all-Boeing fleet of 42 aircraft, flying over 4 million passengers, and employed a staff of 6,056 globally. The company's revenues for 2016 were $2.04 billion, with losses of $81 million, compared to a profit of $57 million in 2010. In 2018, the company's revenue was $7.7 billion, with a net loss of $187.55 million. In July 2020, having lost hundreds of millions of dollars due to grounded flights and lay-offs as a result of the COVID-19 pandemic in Israel and abroad, the company reached a bailout deal with the government, and Eli Rozenberg, who purchased a controlling stake (42.85%) in September of that year, with the government purchasing any unwanted shares (15%). El Al offers only kosher in-flight meals, and does not fly passengers on the Jewish Shabbat or religious holidays.

== History ==
=== 1948–1949: Foundation, first flights to Europe ===
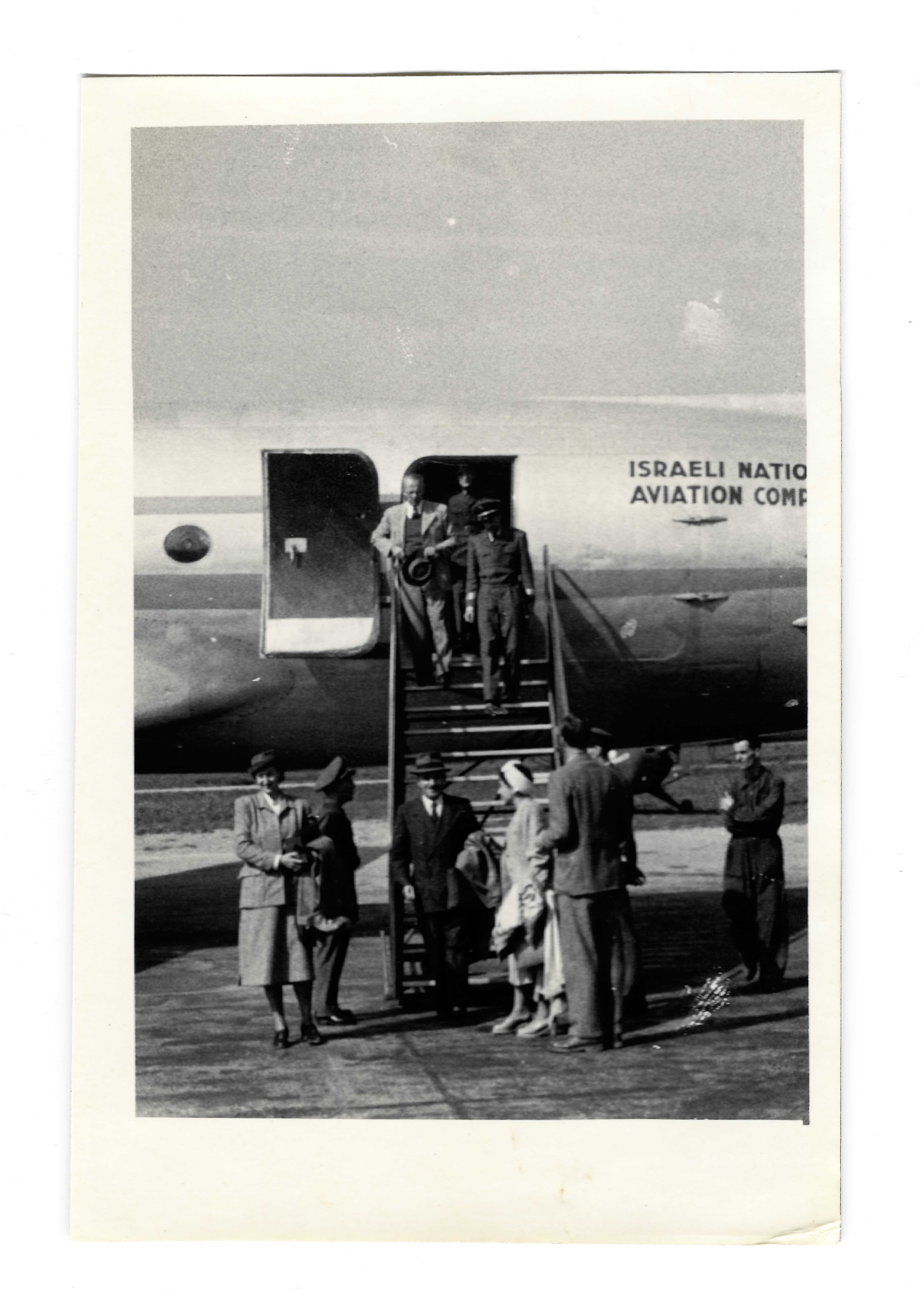
Chaim Weizmann disembarks from an El Al Douglas DC-4 (September 1948)

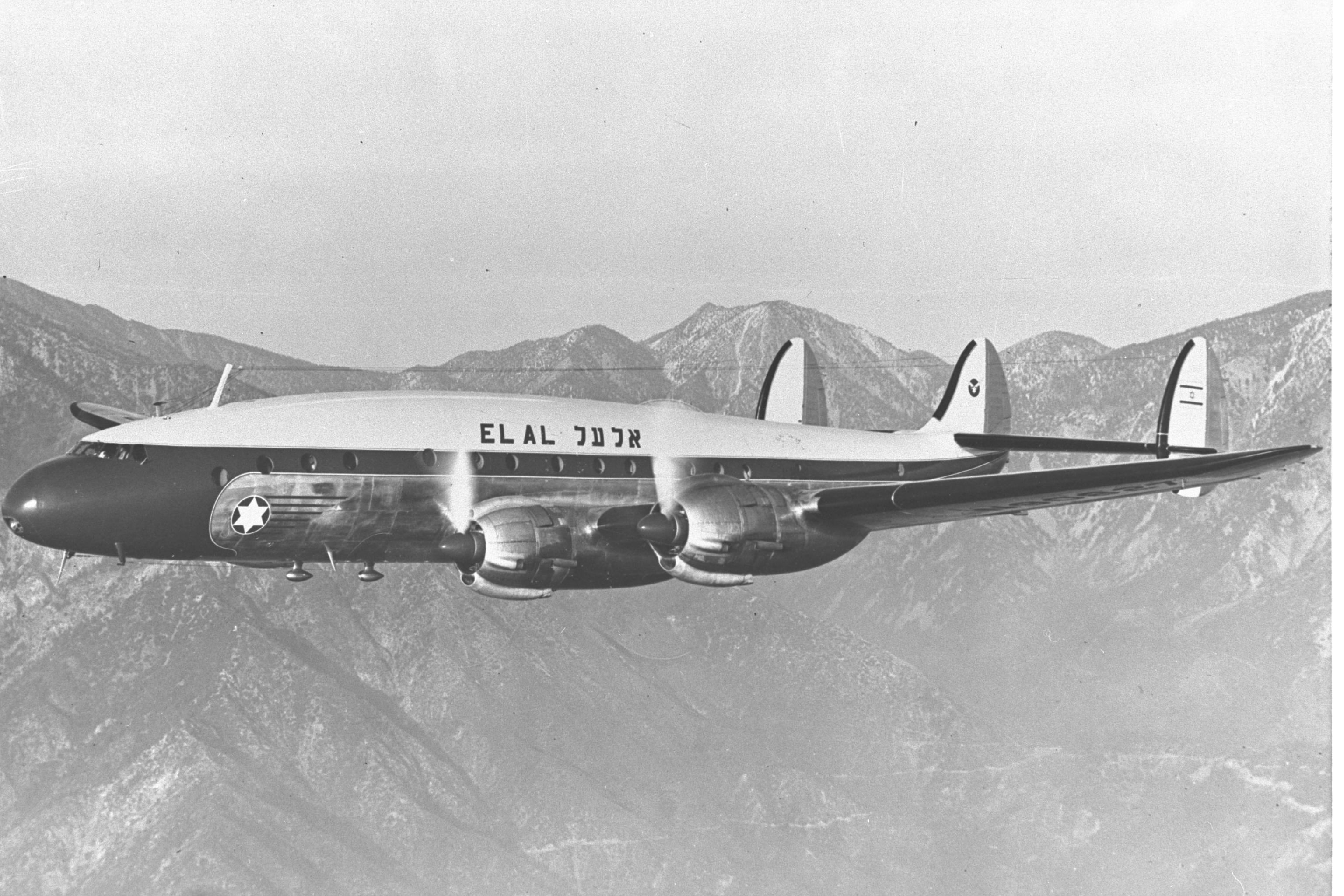
El Al Lockheed Constellation (1951)

In September 1948, Israel's first president, Chaim Weizmann, attended a conference in Geneva, Switzerland. Weizmann was scheduled to fly back to Israel in an Israeli government aircraft, but due to an embargo imposed on Israel at the time, an Israeli C-54 military transport aircraft was instead converted into a civilian plane to transport Weizmann home. The aircraft was painted with the logo of the "El Al/Israel National Aviation Company" and fitted with extra fuel tanks to enable a non-stop flight from Geneva to Israel. It departed from Ekron Air Base on 28 September and returned to Israel the next day. After the flight, the aircraft was repainted and returned to military use.

The airline was incorporated and became Israel's national flag carrier on 15 November 1948, although it used leased aircraft until February 1949, when two unpressurized DC-4s were purchased from American Airlines. The acquisition was funded by the government of Israel, the Jewish Agency, and other Jewish organizations. The first plane arrived at Lod Airport (later renamed Ben Gurion) on 3 April 1949. Aryeh Pincus, a lawyer from South Africa, was elected head of the company. The first international flight, from Tel Aviv to Paris, with refueling in Rome, took place on 31 July 1949. By the end of 1949, the airline had flown passengers to London and Johannesburg. A state-run domestic airline, Israel Inland Airlines, was founded in 1949 in which El Al had a 50% stake.

From its earliest days, the operation of the airline in keeping with Jewish tradition has been a source of friction; when the Israeli prime minister David Ben-Gurion was forming his first coalition, the religious parties would not join unless Ben-Gurion promised that El Al would serve only kosher food and would not fly on the Jewish Sabbath. El Al was named by David Remez, the first Minister of Transport, based on Hosea 11: "They call El Al (upwards)."

=== 1950s: Adding cargo service and destinations ===
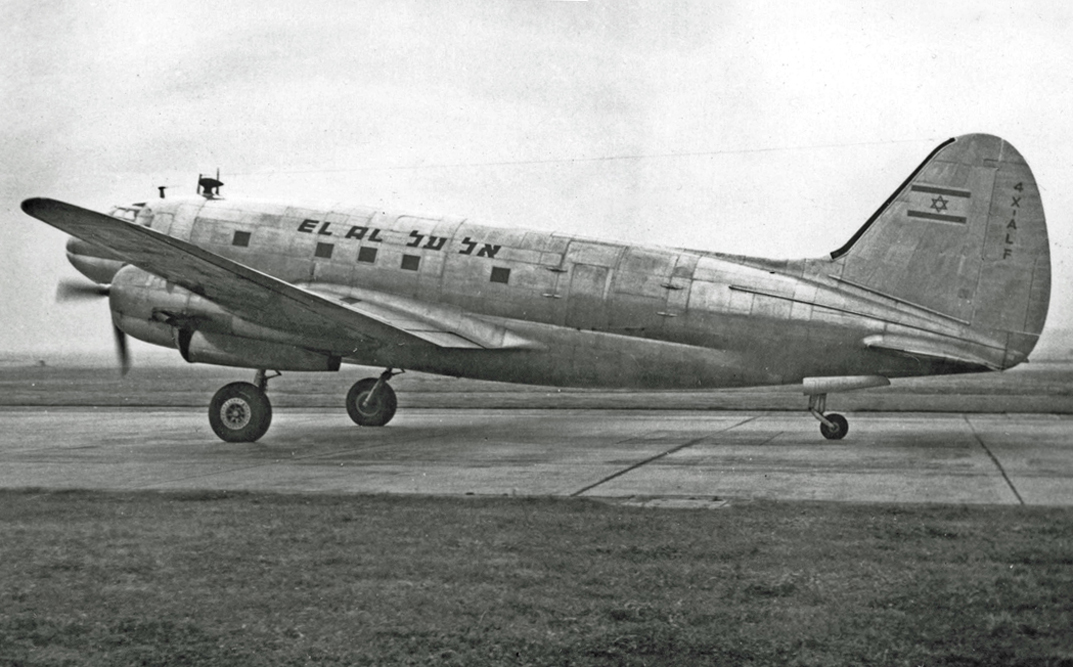
A Curtiss Commando freight aircraft of El Al

A regular service to London was inaugurated in the middle of 1950. Later that year, El Al acquired Universal Airways, which was owned by South African Zionists.

El Al's cargo service was inaugurated in 1950 and initially relied on military surplus Curtiss C-46 Commando aircraft. The same aircraft type was used also for passengers transportation in certain routes. The same year, the airline initiated charter services to the United States, followed by scheduled flights soon after.

From 1950 to 1951, El Al expanded its activities in Europe and added new destinations such as Vienna and Istanbul, Athens and Nicosia. On 31 July 1950, the company celebrated the first anniversary of its regular flight program.

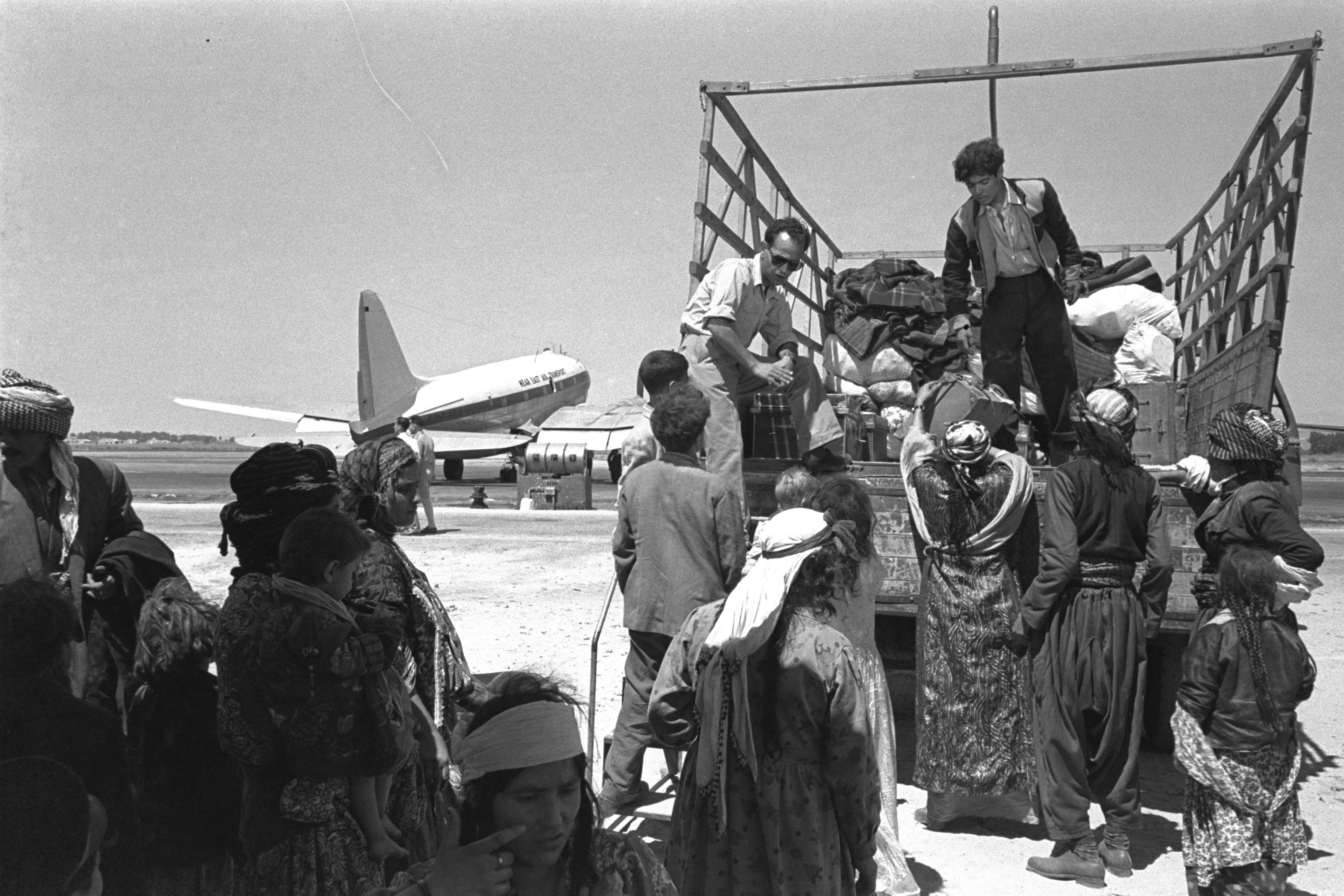
Kurdish Jewish Immigrants from Iraq leaving Lod Airport (1951). In the background is a C-46 of El Al affiliate Near East Air Transport

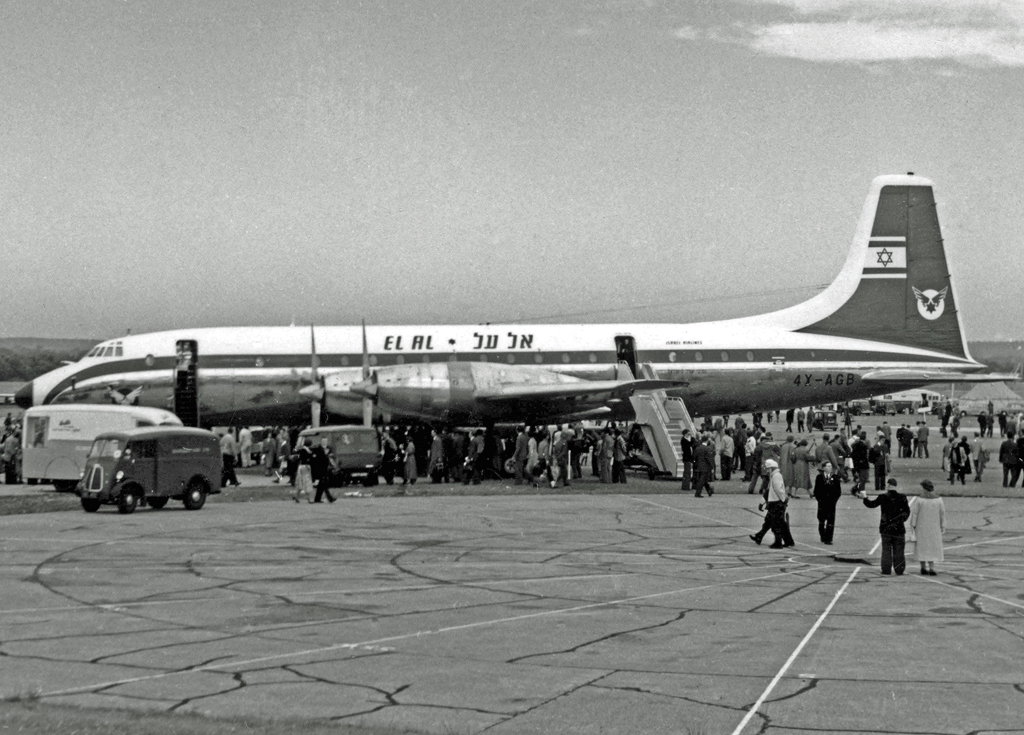
A Bristol Britannia of El Al at Farnborough Airport just before delivery to the airline (1957)

The airline was involved in several covert operations:

- From 1949 to 1951, Near East Air Transport (NEAT) airlifted migrants to Israel, most notably from Yemen and Iraq in Operation Magic Carpet and Operation Ezra and Nehemiah respectively. NEAT originated as a spinoff from Alaska Airlines, but El Al had complete control of it by 1951 and several El Al aircraft flew under NEAT "cover," sometimes using Cuban registrations.
- In 1960, Nazi war criminal Adolf Eichmann was captured and flown from Argentina to Israel on an El Al aircraft.

In 1955, after using Lockheed Constellations for several years, the airline purchased two Bristol Britannia aircraft. El Al was the second airline in the world to fly this plane, after the British Overseas Airways Corporation. In 1958, El Al ran a newspaper advertisement in the United States featuring a picture of a "shrunken" Atlantic Ocean ("Starting Dec. 23, the Atlantic Ocean will be 20% smaller") to promote its non-stop transatlantic flights. This was a bold step: the airline industry had never used images of the ocean in its advertising because of the widespread public fear of airline crashes. The advertisement, which ran only once, proved effective. Within a year, El Al's sales tripled.

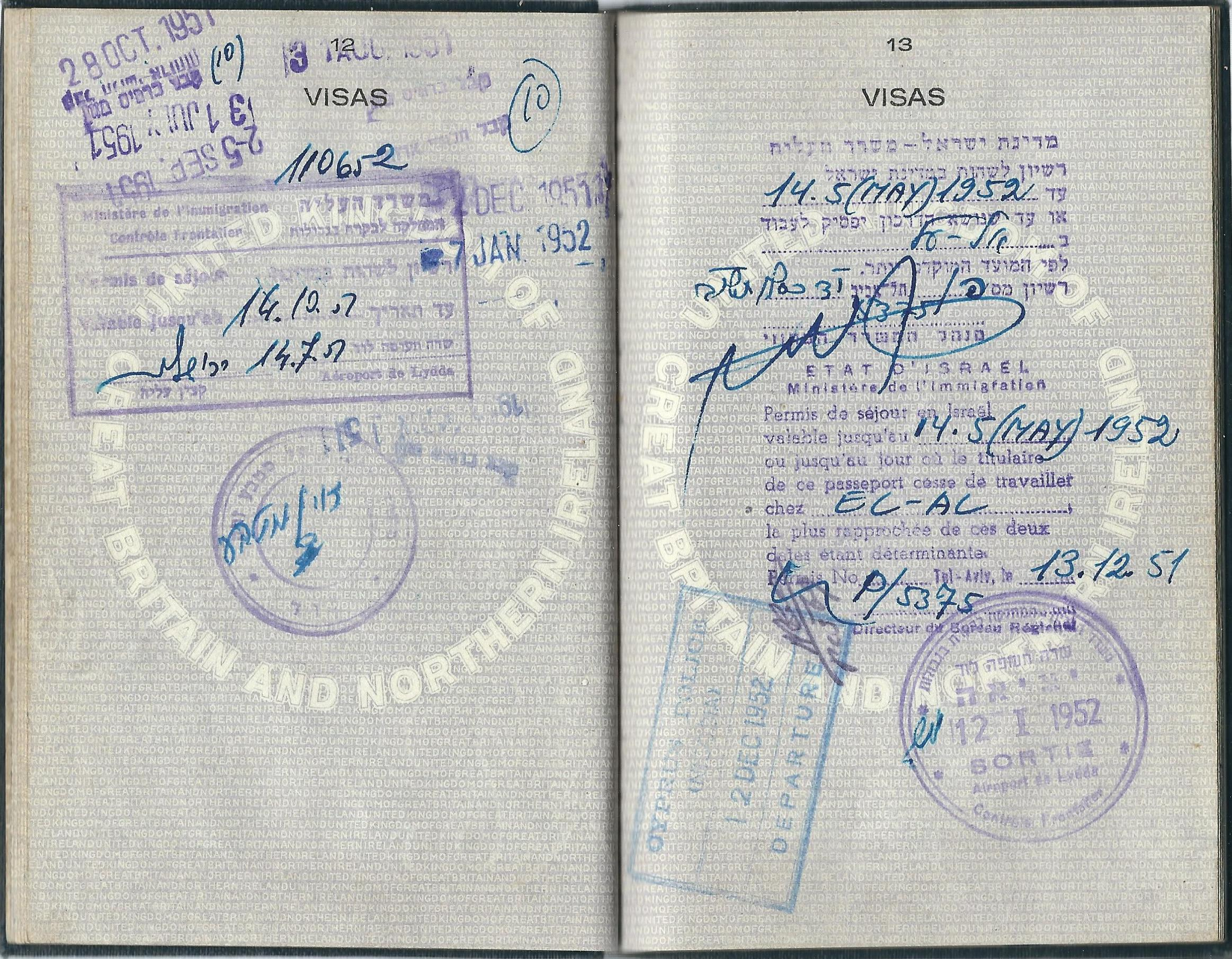
1951 British mechanic's residence permit for Israel – El Al worker

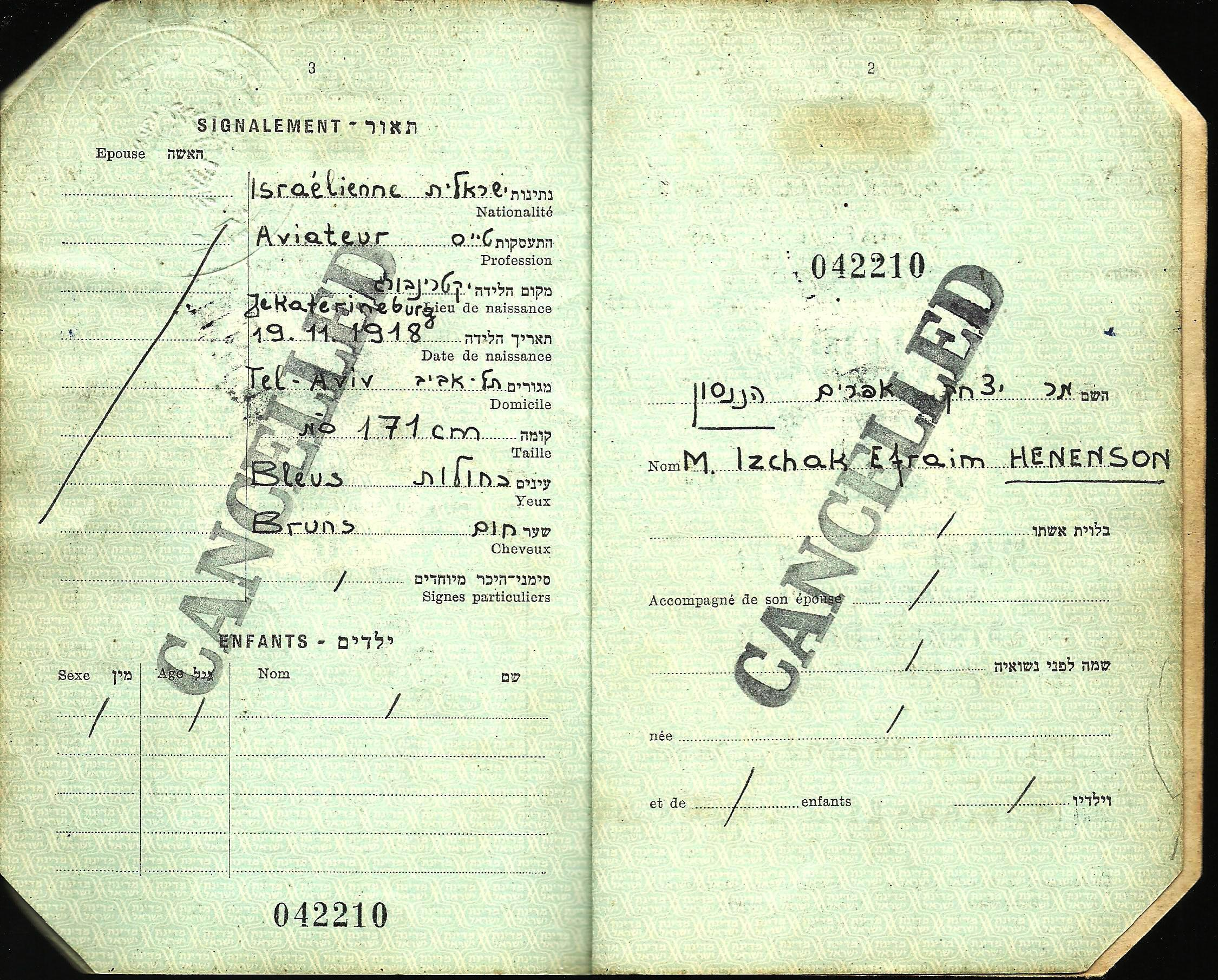
A 1951 El Al pilot's early Israeli passport

=== 1960s: Turning profitable, first Boeings ===
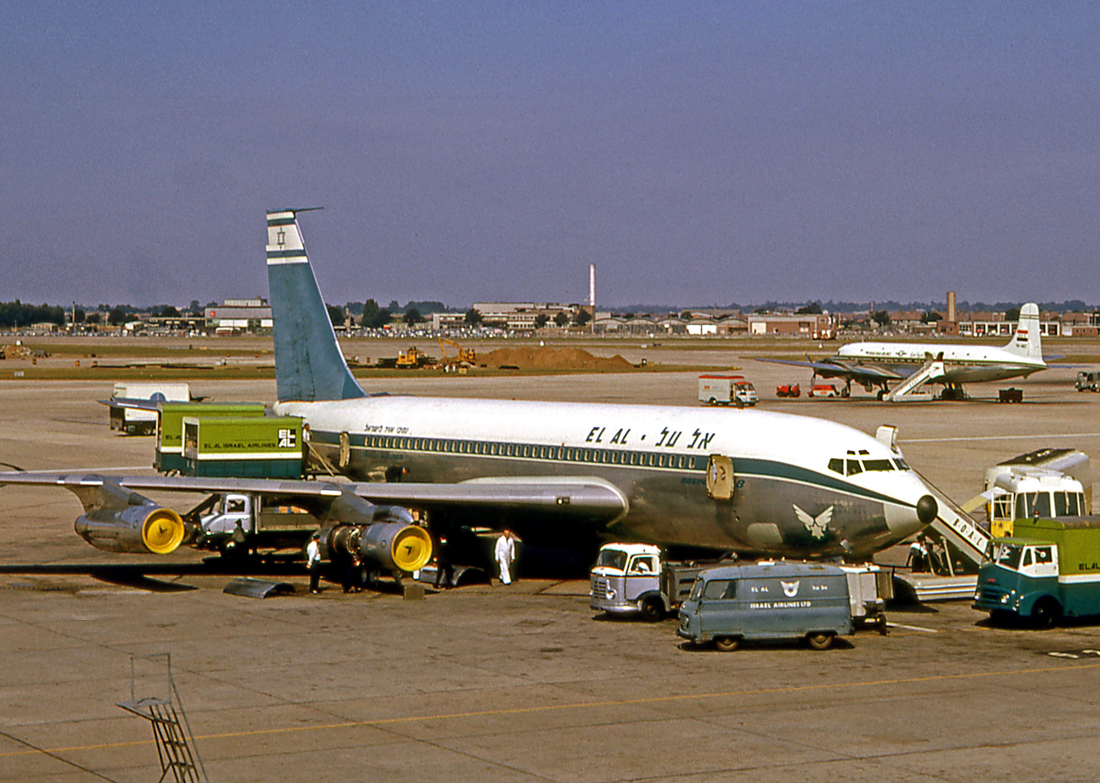
El Al Boeing 720 being serviced at London Heathrow Airport (1964)

Despite the purchase of its Britannia and the inauguration of non-stop transatlantic flights, the airline remained unprofitable. When Efraim Ben-Arzi took over the company in the late 1950s, the Britannias were replaced in the next decade by the Boeing 707 and Boeing 720 jet airliners.

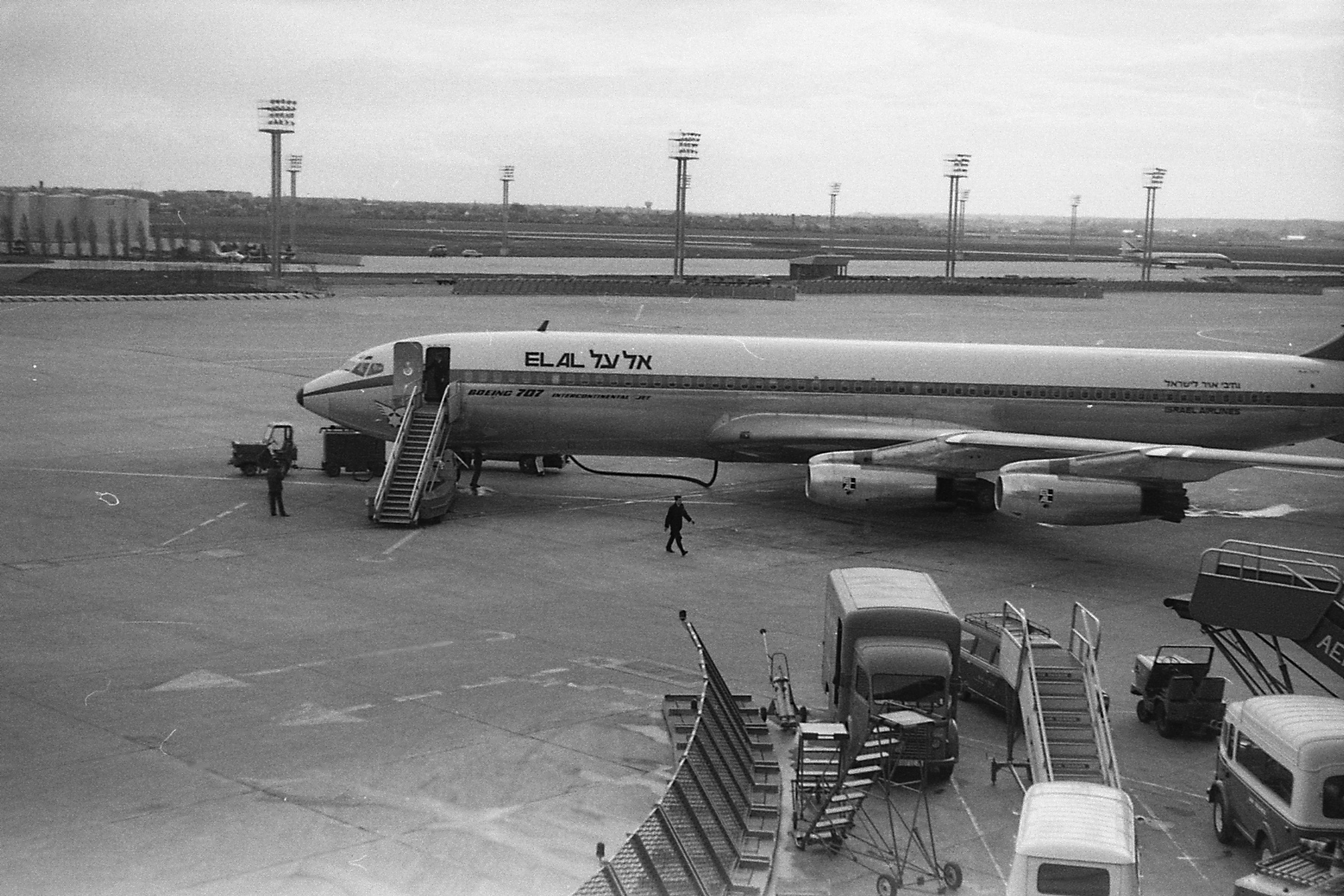
El Al Boeing 707 at Orly Airport, Paris (1965)

The first year that El Al turned a profit was 1960. That year, more than 50 percent of the passengers flying into Israel arrived on El Al flights. On 15 June 1961, the airline set a world record for the longest non-stop commercial flight: an El Al Boeing 707 flew from New York to Tel Aviv, covering 5,760 miles (9,270 km) in 9 hours and 33 minutes. By this time, El Al was carrying 56,000 passengers a year—on a par with Qantas and ahead of established airlines like Loftleiðir. In 1961, El Al ranked 35th in the world in accumulated passenger distance. El Al's success continued into the late 1960s. In 1968, regular flights to Bucharest were inaugurated, and cargo flights began to Europe and the United States. The airline also established a catering subsidiary, Teshet Tourism, and Aviation Services Ltd. All these ventures brought in a profit of $2 million that year.

==== Hijacking attempts ====
In 1968, El Al experienced the first of many acts of terrorism that have been perpetrated against the airline. On 23 July, the only successful hijacking of an El Al aircraft took place, when a Boeing 707 carrying 10 crew and 38 passengers were taken over by three members of the Popular Front for the Liberation of Palestine (PFLP). The aircraft, El Al Flight 426, which was en route from Rome to Tel Aviv, was diverted to Algiers by the hijackers. Negotiations with the hijackers lasted for 40 days. Both the hijackers and the passengers, including 21 Israeli hostages, were eventually freed. On 26 December of the same year, two PFLP members attacked an El Al aircraft at Athens International Airport, killing an Israeli mechanic. The Israel Defense Forces responded to the incident on 29 December, with a night-time raid on Lebanon's Beirut Airport, destroying 14 planes on the ground belonging to Middle East Airlines, Trans Mediterranean Airways and Lebanese International Airways. The military action was responsible for the demise of the LIA, which had most of its fleet destroyed.

On 18 February 1969, Palestinians attacked an El Al plane at Zurich Airport, killing the copilot and injuring the pilot. One Palestinian attacker was killed and others were convicted but later released. Between September and December of that year, bomb and grenade attacks occurred at El Al offices in Athens, West Berlin, and Brussels. This wave of violence culminated in the failed hijacking of an El Al 707 by Patrick Arguello and Leila Khaled on 6 September 1970, as part of the Dawson's Field hijackings.

=== 1970s: Going full Boeing, Shabbat observance ===
Revenue passenger-kilometers, scheduled flights only, in millions
Year	Traffic
1950	50
1955	138
1960	413
1965	1331
1969	2070
1971	3027
1980	4590
1985	6507
1995	11287
2000	14125

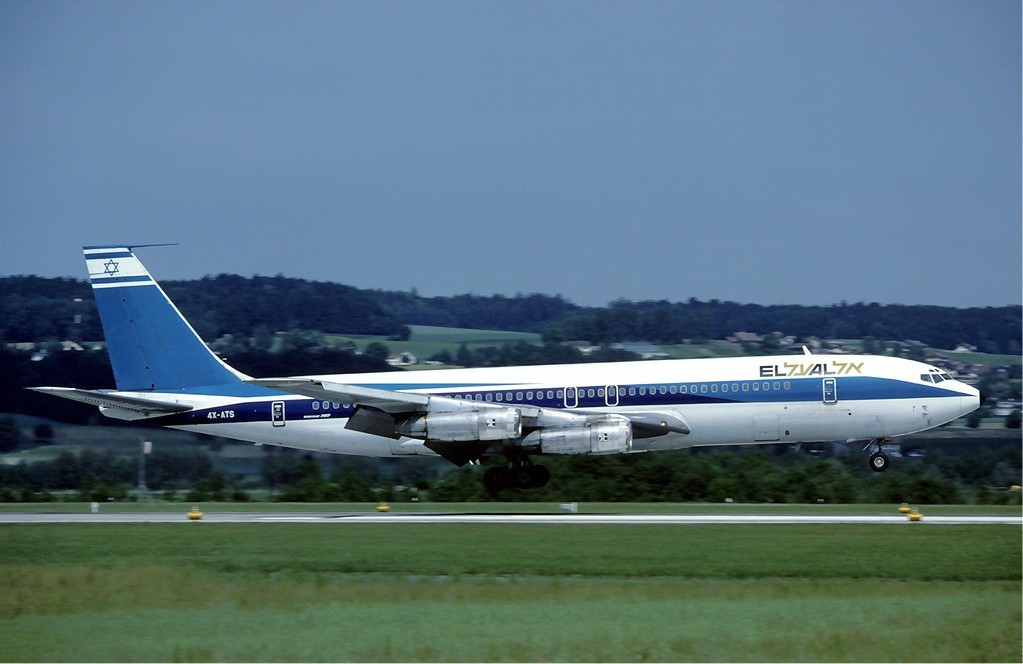
El Al Boeing 707-300B landing at Zurich Airport, Switzerland (1982)

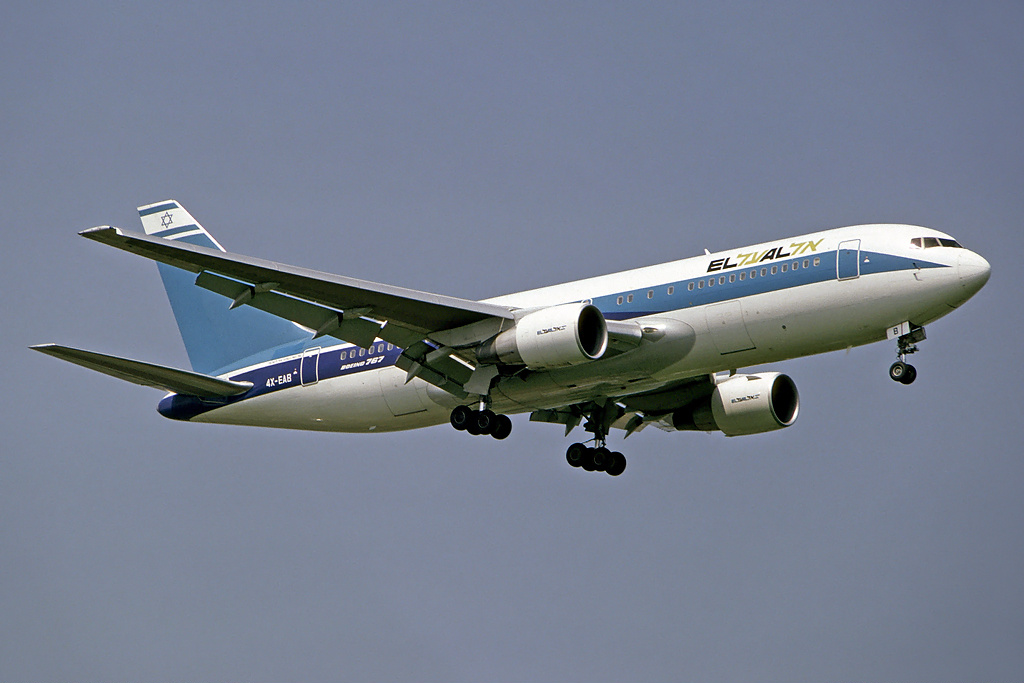
El Al Boeing 767-200 (1985)

El Al acquired its first Boeing 747 jet in 1971. Many felt it was a risky purchase given the high cost of the plane and fear of attacks, but El Al operations flourished after the purchase. Another Boeing 747 was delivered in 1973 and was used to start non-stop service from Tel Aviv to New York (El Al – Boeing 707s had flown eastward nonstop since around 1961).

EL AL passengers and passengers from other airlines were attacked at Lod Airport in 1972 in an attack known as the Lod Airport massacre.

In the mid 1970s, El Al began to schedule flights from airports outside of Israel that departed on the Jewish shabbat and landed in Israel after it had finished. However, the religious parties in the government were outraged by this change believing that it was a violation of Jewish law and contrary to the agreement signed in the early days of the state, in which El Al promised to refrain from flying on the Sabbath. In 1982, the newly re-elected prime minister Menachem Begin, brought before the Knesset a vote to ban Sabbath flights once again (it passed by a vote of 58 to 54). Outraged, the secular community threatened to boycott the airline. In August 1982, El Al workers blocked Orthodox and Hasidic Jews from entering the airport.

In 1977, El Al established a charter subsidiary, El Al Charter Services Ltd., later renamed Sun D'Or International Airlines Ltd. Two years earlier, the airline had suffered its first losses since the late 1950s, largely a product of the global recession. The management changed three times towards the end of the 1970s until Itzhak Shander was named president. As the political situation in Iran deteriorated, El Al began to airlift Jews to Israel. All the airline's infrastructure in Iran was eventually destroyed.

=== 1980s: To Cairo, from receivership to profitability ===
El Al flights to Cairo were inaugurated in April 1980, following the Egypt–Israel peace treaty. In late 1982, after a long period of labor disputes and strikes, El Al operations were suspended. The government appointed Amram Blum to run the company, which lost $123.3 million in the fiscal year ending April 1983. The airline also sold its stake in Arkia at this time.

Operations resumed in January 1983 under receivership. The government purchased two new Boeing 737 aircraft and announced plans to acquire four Boeing 767 jets at the cost of $200 million. Within four years, El Al was profitable again. It broke another record since then surpassed in May 1988 with a non-stop flight from Los Angeles to Tel Aviv, a journey of 7,000 nautical miles (13,000 km) in 13 hours and 41 minutes.

Flights to Poland and Yugoslavia were started in 1989.

=== 1990s: End of receivership, Ethiopian Jews airlifted ===
In January 1990, North American Airlines began providing feeder services to El Al's US destinations. El Al held a 24.9 percent stake in the airline until selling it back to Dan McKinnon in July 2003. By this time, El Al was operating a fleet of 20 aircraft, including nine Boeing 747s, and had begun replacing its aging Boeing 707s with the Boeing 757. Early that year, following the collapse of the Soviet Union, El Al inaugurated regular flights to Moscow. No airlifts from the former Soviet Union were possible at the time but permission was granted in 1991. Charter flights commenced in August 1991, with immigrants also occupying all available seats on El Al's scheduled routes. In cooperation with Aeroflot, El Al flew more than 400,000 Jewish immigrants to Israel within a three-year period.

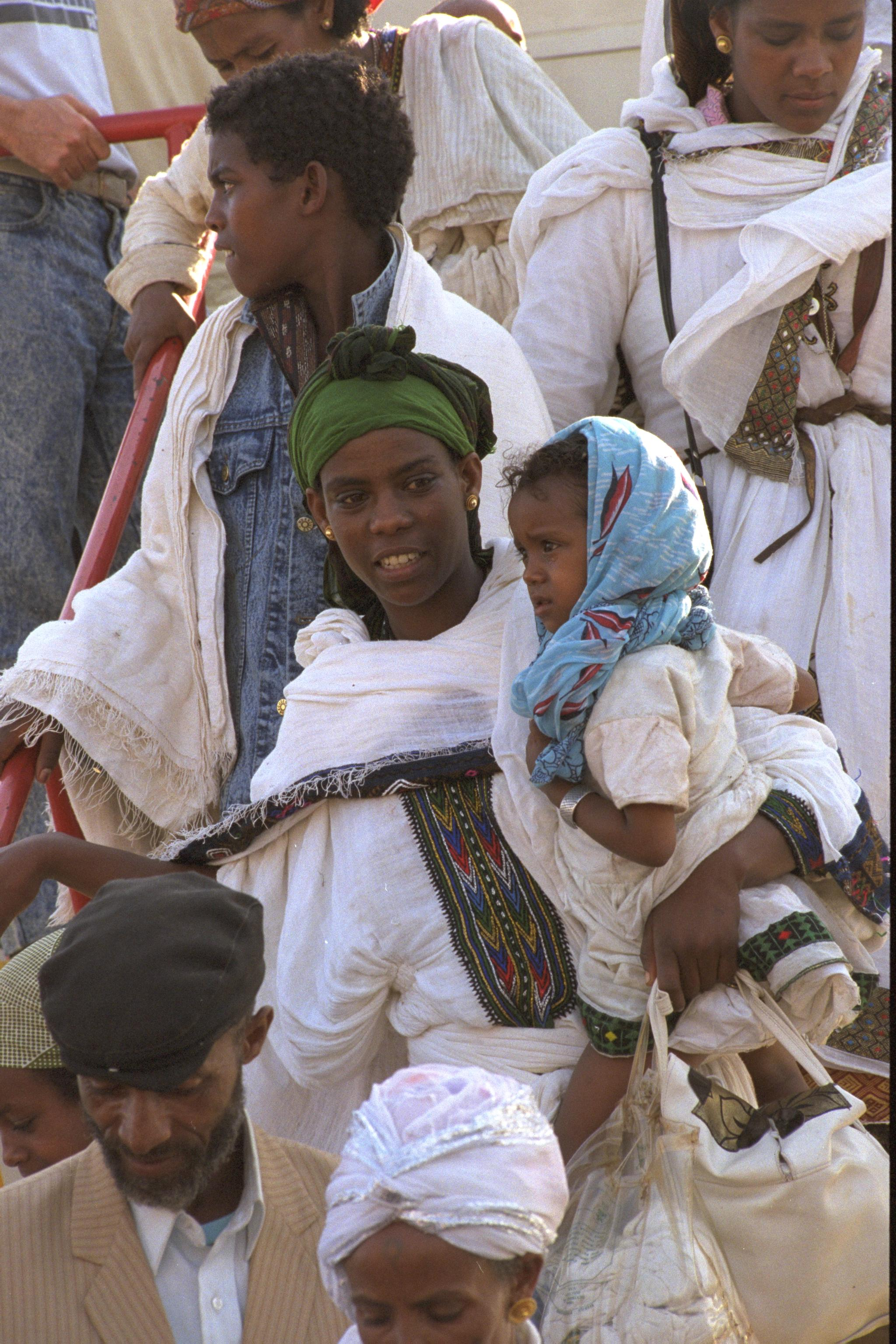
El Al helped with the airlifting of Ethiopian immigrants from Ethiopia during Operation Solomon in 1991.

On 24 May 1991, an El Al Boeing 747 cargo plane airlifted a record-breaking 1,088 Ethiopian Jews from Addis Ababa to Israel in the framework of Operation Solomon. Two babies were born during the flight. The plane carried twice as many passengers as it was designed for. In less than 36 hours, 14,500 Ethiopian Jews were flown to Israel. On 27 April 1994, El Al received its first Boeing 747-400.

El Al flights were inaugurated to the Far East and, in 1995, El Al signed its first codesharing agreement with American Airlines. In February 1995, the receivership under which the airline had technically been operating since 1982 came to an end. In June 1996, El Al recorded its first flight from Israel to Amman, Jordan.

In 1996, El Al recorded US$83.1 million in losses, due to the resumption of terrorist activities and the government's open skies policy. To keep its planes flying during this period, El Al introduced flights "to nowhere": passengers were offered various kinds of in-flight entertainment as the plane circled the Mediterranean. One-day shopping trips to London and visits to religious sites in eastern Europe were also promoted. In 1997, El Al opened a separate cargo division.

=== 2000s: Boeing 777, privatization ===
El Al's first Boeing 777 embarked on its maiden flight in March 2000. Later that year, the controversy over flights on Shabbat erupted again, when the airline announced that it was losing US$55 million a year by grounding its planes on Saturdays. After privatization of the company began in June 2003, the policy regarding Shabbat flights was expected to change.

The first phase of the long-delayed privatization of the company commenced in June 2003 and by Israel's Government Companies Authority, headed by Eyal Gabbai. 15 percent of El Al's shares were listed on the Tel Aviv Stock Exchange. By June 2004, 50% of the company had been sold to the public. By January 2005, a controlling share of the company had been transferred to Knafaim-Arkia Holdings Ltd. As of October 2014, El Al's major shareholders were Knafaim Holdings (36%), Ginsburg Group (10%) and Delek Group (10%).

=== 2010s: First 787 Dreamliner, last 747 ===
In August 2010, El Al and JetBlue signed an agreement to provide connecting through tickets between Israel and 61 destinations in the United States from October 2010, via John F. Kennedy International Airport in New York.

In 2015, El Al introduced a requirement that female flight attendants wear high heels until passengers had been seated. The airline's workers' union stated that the requirement would endanger the health and safety of the flight attendants and instructed its members to ignore the rule. Later that year, the requirement was removed.

In August 2017, El Al made their inaugural flight of the Boeing 787 Dreamliner. Their first variant of the plane was the 787-9, but in late 2019, they took delivery of the 787-8. The inaugural service was from Tel Aviv to London and Paris, with the transatlantic inaugural flight from Tel Aviv to Newark. El Al introduced a Premium Economy Class to this aircraft, in a 2-3-2 configuration. They also launched an upgraded Business Class with "pods" in a 1-2-1 configuration. This was upgraded from the original 2-3-2 configuration of their Business Class on the 777-200. Their Economy Class now also featured large personal touch screen entertainment and WiFi. In Business Class, the seats go to a 90° flat bed, have personal service, large touchscreen personal entertainment screens, and storage.

In April 2018, the Israel Postal Company issued a stamp with different El Al planes commemorating the 70th anniversary of the airline.

In July 2019, El Al retired its sole freight aircraft, a Boeing 747-400F, ending its dedicated cargo flights. The airline plans to use charter services by other airlines for this purpose from now on.

2019 also marked the discontinuation of first class, which was already absent fromt he dreamliners; the remaining first class seats, now entirely on the pre-refurbishment 777 fleet, were operated as part of business class since then.

=== 2020s: From COVID to record profits ===
In March 2020, El Al suspended operations due to the ongoing COVID-19 pandemic. The Israeli government had announced that all foreign and Israeli passport holders would have to undergo a 14-day quarantine upon arrival into the country. El Al also converted some of their Boeing 787 Dreamliner airplanes to serve as cargo flights to transport medical goods from China to Europe through Tel Aviv's Ben Gurion Airport. El Al also offered some passenger flights to get stranded Israeli citizens home. These flights went from Tel Aviv to Miami, New York, London, Paris, and more. They also offered two services to Australia during the pandemic. This was the first ever nonstop flight from Israel to Australia. El Al offered one flight from Tel Aviv to Perth and Tel Aviv to Melbourne.

On 1 July 2020, after returning substantial amounts of leased aircraft (and canceling current leases) the airline canceled all flights and suspended operations indefinitely. On 6 July, the company announced it had worked out a bailout deal with the government to make up the hundreds of millions of dollars it had lost due to the COVID-19 pandemic in Israel and abroad. The proposed deal would net the airline $250 million in government loans (with a guarantee for 75 percent of the loan in case of defaults) and an additional $150 million from its own sale of company shares which, if not sold, would be purchased by the government. The deal was approved by a Knesset committee. On 17 September, it was announced that Kanfei Nesharim, a company owned by 27-year-old Eli Rozenberg (son of US Centers Health Care nursing home chain founder Kenny Rozenberg), had bought a controlling 42.85% stake in the airline with a $107 million offer. Under the prior negotiated bailout deal, the Israeli government, which had committed to buying any unwanted shares as part of a rescue package, bought $34 million worth of shares, for a stake that equals roughly 15% of the company. The holdings of El Al's owners before the bailout, Knafaim Holdings, fell to 15.2% from 38%. The new management will seek to emphasize "punctuality" and work to upgrade food services across all classes.

On 17 April 2022, El Al started its first direct flight between the Israeli coastal city of Tel Aviv and Egypt's Red Sea resort of Sharm el-Sheikh. Flight 5193 is operated by El Al subsidiary Sun d'Or.

Beginning on August 2023, El Al reconfigured its Boeing 777 fleet into a new interior matching that of the 787 fleet. The procees, which was initially launched in 2019 but delayed due to the COVID-19 pandemic, was expected to last two years, but was completed only in November 2026.

In October 2023, following the need for the urgent return of reserve soldiers due to the start of the Gaza war, El Al gained halachic approval from the Chief Rabbinate of Israel to break a 40-year policy of not flying on Shabbat, with the last time it flew on a Sabbath being in 1982 during the First Lebanon War. They also flew on the Sabbath following the attacks on Israeli football supporters in November 2024.

2024 brought a record profit of $545 million to the company, as many competitors cancelled flights to Tel Aviv due to the Gaza war. Critics charged that El Al was engaged in price gouging, but El Al denied the charge, saying it capped its prices. El Al also blamed the rise in ticket prices on a global "shortage of aircraft, engines and parts and supply chain delays".

== Company affairs and identity ==
Flag of El Al

Logo from 1960s

=== Headquarters ===
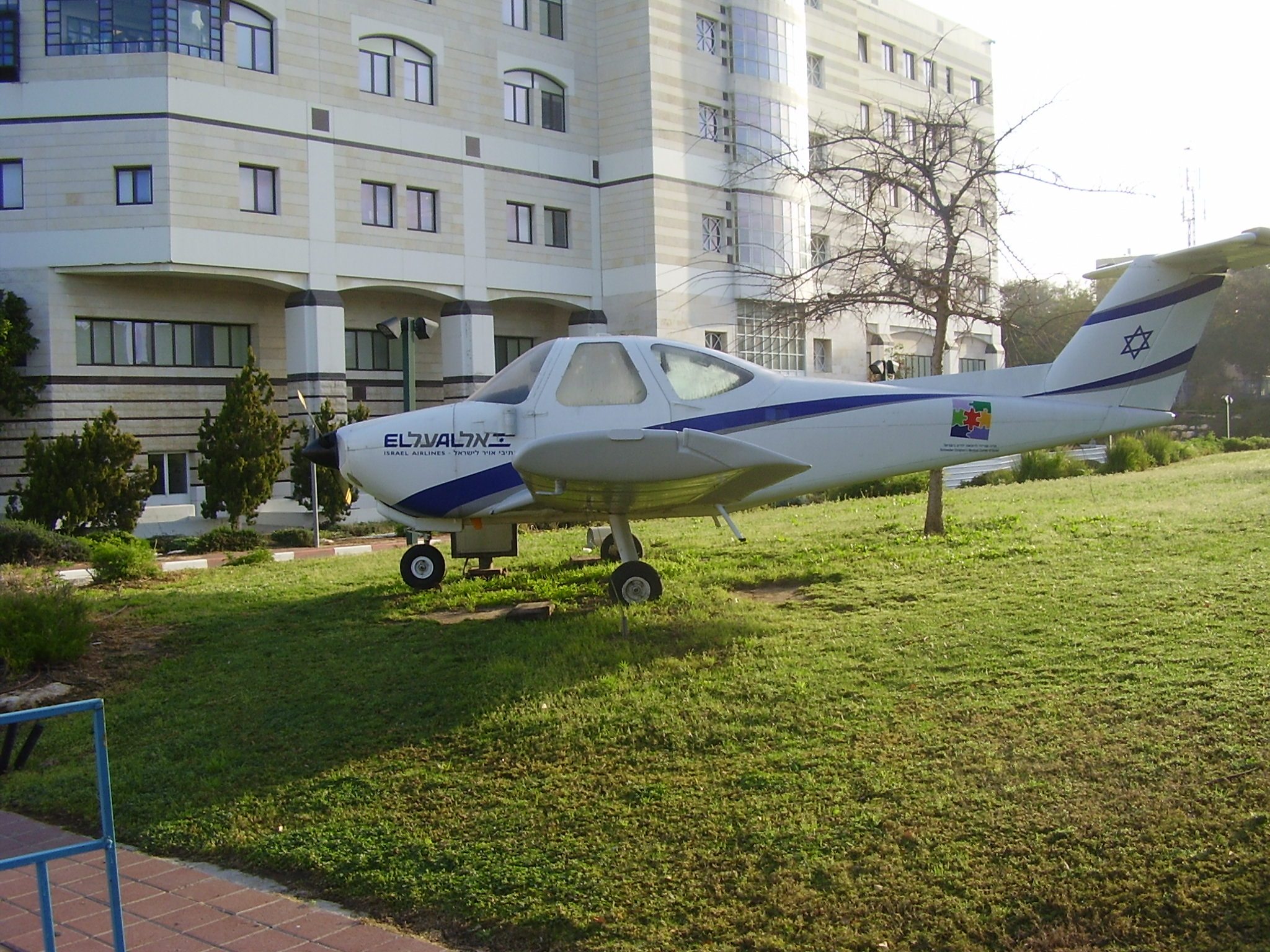
A small aircraft painted in El Al livery at Schneider Children's Medical Center in Petah Tikva

El Al's headquarters are located on the grounds of Ben Gurion Airport in Central District, Israel, near Lod. In 2022, El Al announced it would be moving its U.S. headquarters from New York to Miami.

=== Operations ===
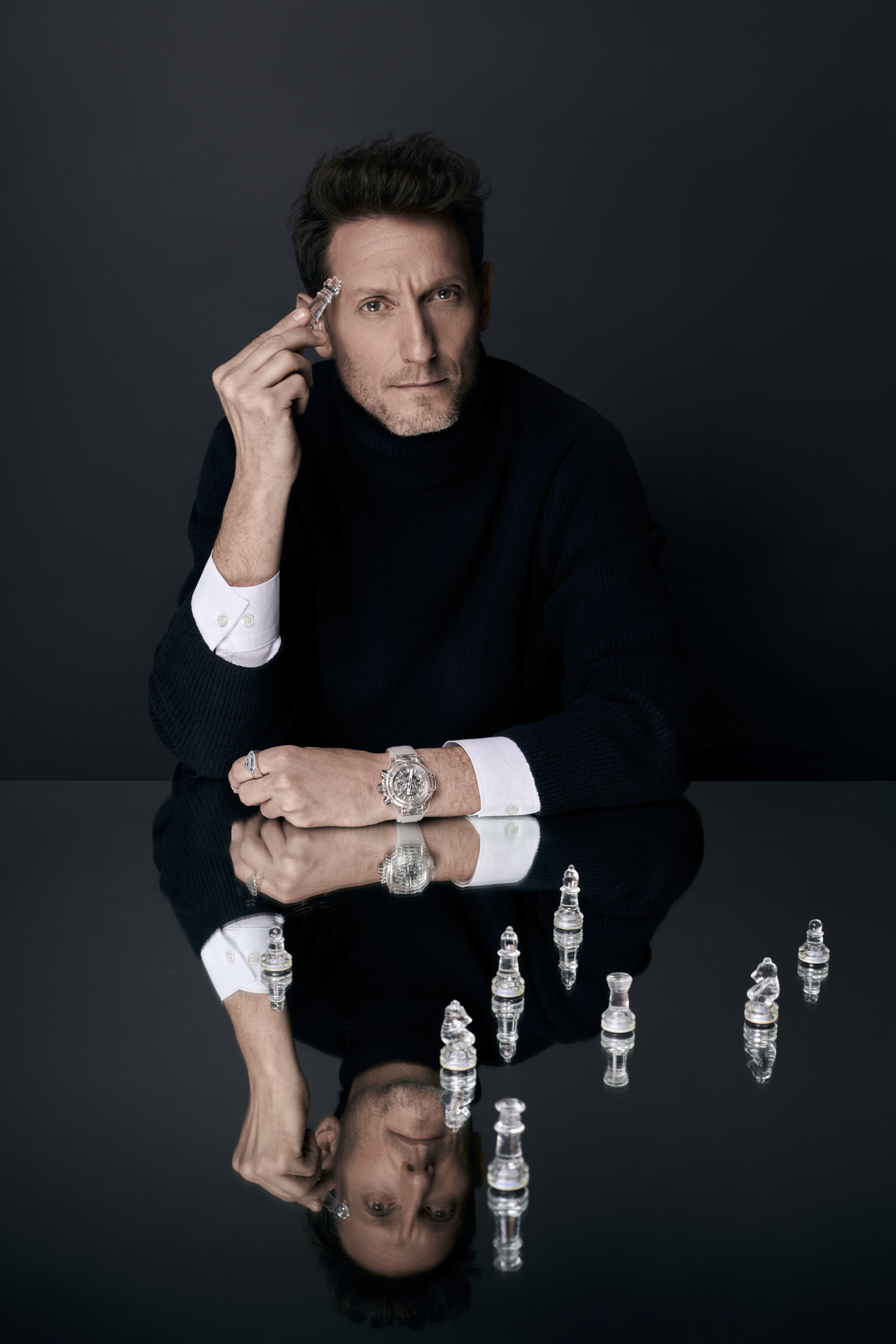
El Al's current (as of 2025) safety video features mentalist Lior Suchard in a prominent role

During 2005, the airline transported 3.5 million passengers, a rise from 3.2 million in 2004 and 2.8 million in 2003. 60% of the airline's passengers are Israeli. In 2006, El Al posted a $44.6 million loss on revenues of $1.665 billion. The company is facing four lawsuits, two of which have been approved as class actions, which could cost the company $176.2 million. El Al spends $100 million a year to conform with airline security measures required by Israel's Shin Bet security service. In early 2007, El Al opened a new King David Lounge at Charles de Gaulle Airport in Paris. New lounges at Heathrow Airport in London and JFK International Airport in New York had also opened in late 2007.

In 2007, El Al invested NIS 1 billion in the purchase of two new Boeing 777-200s that included an updated El Al decal. The aircraft are fitted with upgraded seats with adjustable headrests and legrests. Each seat is equipped with a touch-screen entertainment system. The first aircraft, named "Sderot", completed its maiden flight from New York to Tel Aviv on 26 July 2007. The second, "Kiryat Shmona", was delivered at the end of August 2007.

After the United States Federal Aviation Administration downgraded Israel's aviation safety rating to 2 in February 2009, an IATA member warned El Al, as well as competing airlines Arkia and Israir, that they may appear on the European blacklist of banned carriers. Giora Romm, head of the Civil Aviation Authority of Israel, responded to the claim, stating: "We are in close contact with the Europeans." He added: "I don't know what the fuss is about. The Europeans' e-mail is strange. We are doing everything we can to improve security." The European Union has yet to make an official statement on the matter. El Al uses the Amadeus CRS system for reservation, inventory, check-in and online bookings. In November 2012, the United States FAA restored Israel's category 1 rating.

El Al has a cargo branch, El Al Cargo, which became independent in 1997. As the national cargo airline of Israel, it operates between Tel Aviv, Liège, and New York, plus ad hoc worldwide charters with one Boeing 747-200F aircraft. Before 2001, when the Israeli air cargo market opened up to competition, El Al Cargo enjoyed a monopoly. Now, its main competition comes from Challenge Airlines IL.

As of December 2022, the company employs a staff of 4,610 globally, and has a fleet of 47 aircraft. The company's revenues for 2023 were $2.503 billion, totaling profits of $263.7 million, compared to losses of $80.7 million in 2016 and a profit of $57 million in 2010. El Al has offices in 46 countries, half of them in Europe.

El Al has Hebrew language voiceovers and Arabic language subtitles in its flight safety videos, which is followed by another video in English. In 2017, the safety video was presented by mentalist Lior Suchard.

During the period of Shabbat, El Al observes Jewish religious traditions by refraining from flight operations and occasionally diverting flights or refraining from takeoff if the scheduled arrival would occur on a Saturday. Exceptions to this practice are exceptionally rare, having only occurred twice in the airline's history: first during the First Lebanon War and later during the Gaza war, when flights operated on Shabbat due to exceptional circumstances.

=== Business trends ===
The key trends for El Al Israel Airlines Ltd. are shown below (as at year ending 31 December):

Year	Operating revenues (US$ m)	Profit/loss after tax (US$ m)	Number of passengers (m)	Passenger load factor (%)	Cargo carried (000s tonnes)	Fleet
2017	2,097	5.7				
2018	2,142	−52.2	5.6	83.7	80.7	43
2019	2,178	−59.6	5.8	82.7	74.4	43
2020	623	−531	0.9	69.2	67.0	45
2021	857	−413	1.3	68.5	81.5	45
2022	1,985	109	4.0	83.1	67.2	45
2023	2,503	116	5.4	86.3	68.7	47

== Subsidiaries ==
=== Borenstein Caterers ===
The main business of Borenstein, a company fully owned by El Al, registered in the U.S. and operating at New York's JFK Airport, is the production and supply of kosher ready meals to airlines and other institutions.

=== Katit ===
Katit (a company fully owned by El Al) is mainly engaged in the production and supply of meals to the company's employees.

=== Sun d'Or ===
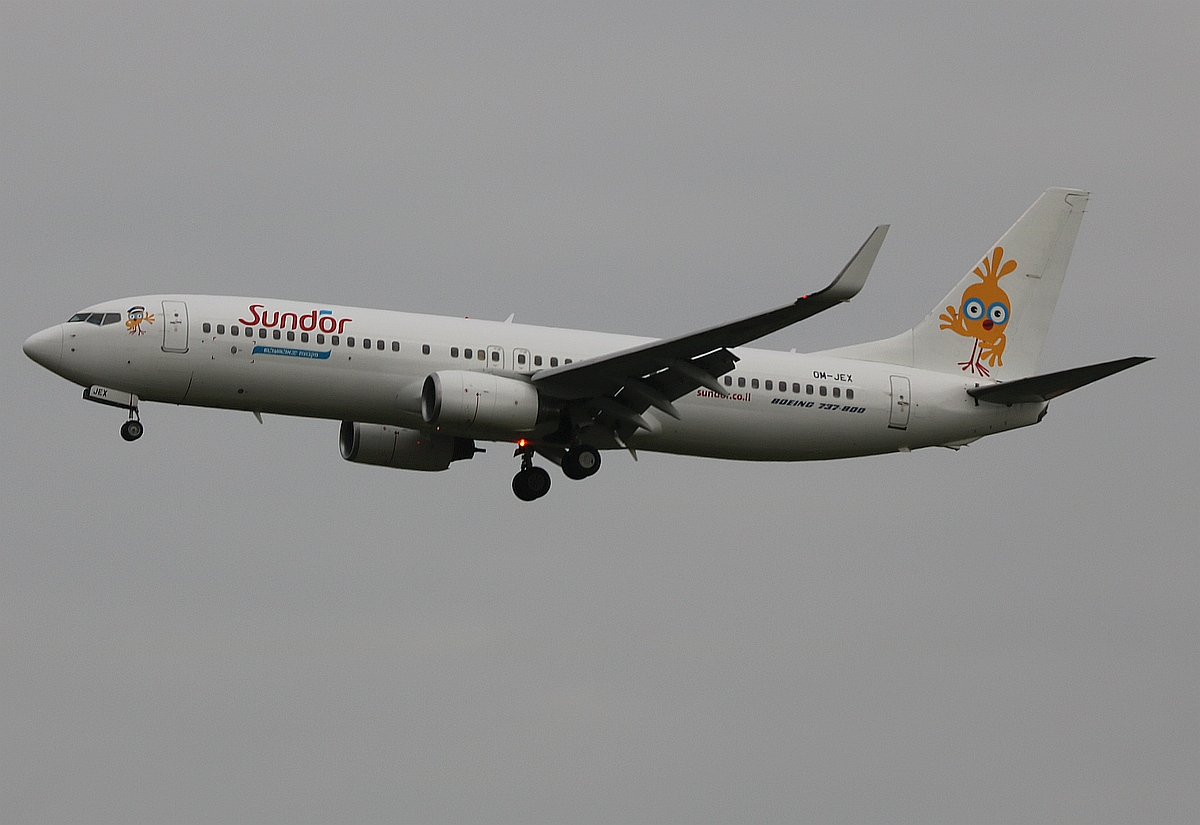
Sun d'Or Boeing 737-800 operated by El Al

The charter operations of the group is carried out through Sun d'Or, a company fully owned by El Al. Sun d'Or operates as a tourist organizer for wholesalers and individuals and markets charter and scheduled flights, both by means of leasing full aircraft capacity to third parties, or aircraft parts' capacity to a number of partners for pre-negotiated prices, or by direct sales. Starting from 2011, Sun d'Or operates as a tourist organizer, while maintaining the "Sun d'Or" brand for scheduled and charter flights marketed by Sun d'Or. In March 2011, The Israel Civil Aviation Authority (CAA) announced the suspension of Sun d'Or's operating license effective 1 April 2011. The CAA based its decision citing non-compliance with Israeli and international airline management standards, mainly lack of self-owned planes and crew. Since then, Sun d'Or no longer operates own aircraft but utilizes planes from its parent, El Al.

=== Superstar Holidays ===
Superstar (a company fully owned by El Al) is a tourist wholesaler that markets tourist package deals to travel agents and passengers, and sells airline tickets at discounted prices for flights on the company's routes.

=== Tamam ===
Tamam (a company fully owned by El Al) is mainly engaged in the production and supply of kosher ready meals to airline companies.

=== Former ===
==== Up ====
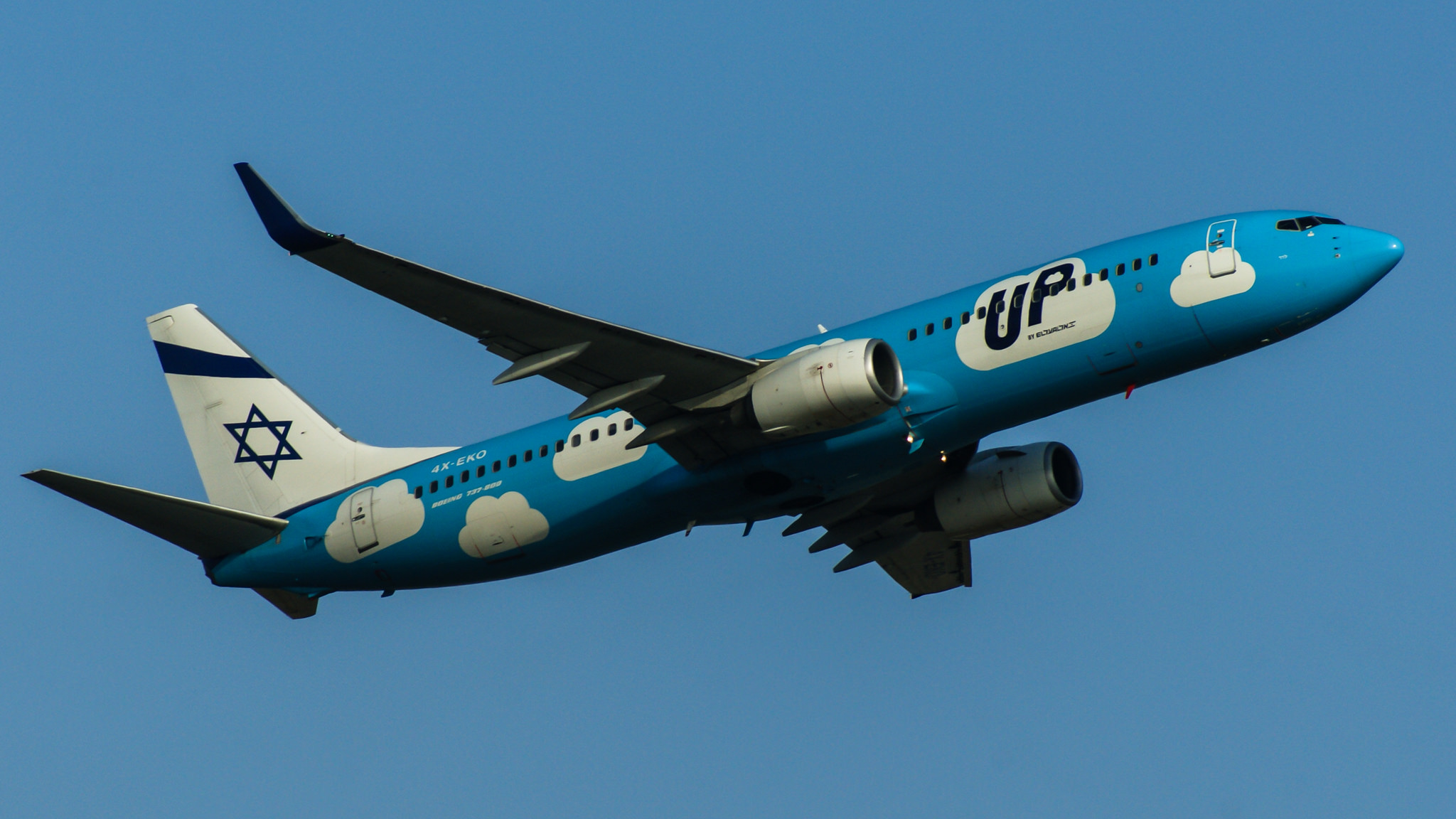
A former Up Boeing 737-800

On 26 November 2013, El Al unveiled its now-defunct low cost airline "Up", which commenced operations on 30 March 2014, initially to Berlin, Budapest, Kyiv, Larnaca and Prague using five Boeing 737-800s transferred from the El Al fleet. Up was founded by its parent El Al to be used on some routes to Europe where it replaced El Al itself. All Up flights were operated by El Al, using El Al's call sign and codes with a four digit number. For flights over two hours, the airline offered a buy on board service.

In August 2014, Ryanair CEO Michael O'Leary foreshadowed the development of a Ryanair Israel, connecting Israel with cities across Europe. He said an inhibiting factor in the plan was Israeli authorities' protectiveness of El Al from competition. The CEO of Up wished to recreate the airline business world. Ryanair started serving Ovda Airport and Ben Gurion Airport in the winter season 2017-18 from several airports throughout Europe.

Up ceased operations on 14 October 2018. All of its six destinations and fleet were reintegrated into mainline El Al operations.

== Security ==
Israel's airport security measures were instituted in 1968 after the El Al Flight 426 hijacking by the Popular Front for the Liberation of Palestine. It was the first aviation attack motivated by political aims.

El Al employs stringent security procedures, both on the ground and onboard its aircraft. These time-consuming procedures have won El Al's security reputation. In 2008, it was named by Global Traveler magazine as the world's most secure airline.

=== Onboard missile defense systems ===
Certain El Al planes have been fitted with counter-measures against anti-aircraft missiles since the early 2000s, with the initial system known as Flight Guard. In 2014, El Al began to fit some of its planes that fly on more sensitive routes with an updated missile approach warning system (MAWS) that employs an infrared missile-tracking camera, an "infrared (IR), ultra-violet (UV), or radar missile-approach warning sensor to detect a missile launch in the very early stages of an attack" and a laser system to act as a counter-measure. In November 2014, under the Israeli government's SkyShield programme, Elbit's Commercial Multi-Spectral Infrared Countermeasures (C-MUSIC) system was adopted by El Al.

=== Airport security measures ===
There are four layers of airport security procedures in Israel: early detection outside the airport zone, airport access control, passenger and baggage screening, and on-board security. In the first layer, El Al Staff screen passenger lists before passengers' arrival at the airport.

At Israel's Ben Gurion Airport, plainclothes and uniformed agents monitor the premises for explosives, suspicious behavior, and other threats. Armed security personnel also patrol El Al terminals overseas. Inside the terminal, passengers and their baggage are checked by a trained team. El Al security procedures require that all passengers be interviewed individually prior to boarding, allowing El Al staff to identify possible security threats. Passengers are asked questions about their place of origin, the reason for their trip, their job or occupation, and whether they have packed their bags themselves.

Passengers have to show up at the airport three hours before their flight, in order to be checked at a barrier on the road to the terminal. Arabs, including Israeli Arab citizens, are checked more stringently than any other ethnic group. At the check-in counter, passengers' passports and tickets are closely examined. A passport without a sticker from the security checkers will not be accepted. At passport control, passengers' names are checked against information from the FBI, Canadian Security Intelligence Service (CSIS), Scotland Yard, Shin Bet, and Interpol databases. Luggage is screened and sometimes hand searched. In addition, bags are put through a decompression chamber simulating pressures during flight that could trigger explosives. Even at overseas airports, El Al security agents conduct all luggage searches personally, even if they are supervised by government or private security firms.

=== Flight security measures ===
Undercover agents (sometimes referred to as sky marshals) carrying concealed firearms sit among the passengers on every international El Al flight. Most El Al pilots are former Israeli Air Force pilots. (Note: Most, but not all, El Al's pilots are former pilots of the Israeli Air Force. An article dedicated to an El Al female captain can be found at "With Yom Haatzmaut Festivities, a Gender Barrier Is Broken", The Sisterhood, The Forward.) The cockpits in all El Al aircraft have double doors to prevent entry by unauthorized persons. A code is required to access the doors, and the second door will open only after the first has closed and the person has been identified by the captain or first officer. Furthermore, there are reinforced steel floors separating the passenger cabin from the baggage hold.

In April 2013, the Israeli government increased payments to El Al to secure 97.5% of the airline's security costs ahead of the Open Skies agreement to take effect in 2014 with the European Union.

== Controversies ==
=== Security controversy and passenger profiling ===
The airline was criticized by Hungarian courts for refusing to search luggage with the passenger present, acting against Hungarian domestic laws stipulating that only authorized officials are able to undertake such searches.

In 2008, a civil case was brought to the Supreme Court of Israel by the Association for Civil Rights in Israel, which alleged that El Al's practice of ethnic profiling illegally singled out Arab passengers for tougher treatment. The group had petitioned "for the complete elimination of racial profiling" by the airline. In 2015, the court dismissed the petition on procedural grounds, accepting in part the government's argument "that it could not completely change without heavily burdening all travelers," but reimbursing the Association for Civil Rights in Israel a total of NIS 30,000 for its legal fees, and finding that the petition "had already gotten security to be less discriminatory". The court left the door open for a renewed petition in the future if required.

=== Treatment of female passengers ===
In September 2014, it was reported that there have been repeated incidents where some ultra-Orthodox male passengers refused to sit next to female passengers, sometimes delaying flights. As a result, a petition was initiated with Change.org to pressure El Al to alter their policy of allowing ultra-Orthodox passengers on flights to negotiate switching seats. The petition reads: "Why does El Al Airlines permit female passengers to be bullied, harassed, and intimidated into switching seats which they rightfully paid for and were assigned to by El Al Airlines? One person's religious rights do not trump another person's civil rights".

Following the incidents, Iris Richman, founder of Jewish Voices Together, a group created to address issues of religious pluralism in Israel and the U.S., encouraged passengers to protest this behavior through the US government, referencing "49 U.S. Code § 40127 – Prohibitions on discrimination: Persons in Air Transportation". According to this directive, she wrote, "An air carrier or foreign air carrier may not subject a person in air transportation to discrimination on the basis of race, color, national origin, religion, sex, or ancestry." Richman contacted the U.S. Department of Transportation, Aviation Consumer Protection Division, and stated the department "is willing to investigate any situation where any employee of a carrier – i. e., a steward/ess – participated in asking someone to change a seat because of their gender".

In November 2014, Tova Ross, in The Forward, disagreed that this is discrimination against women. She wrote,

If we [women] want the right to pray and practice and dress in the ways we see fit, why do we cast such caustic aspersions on the premise of a man who calmly asks to change his seat in order for him not to stray from his preferred religious outlook? ... A favor for a fellow human being, no matter how archaic we may deem his beliefs. We are indulging a request that we may neither understand nor agree with, but if it doesn't really put us out, if the flight isn't full, and there is in fact someone who will easily volunteer to switch seats, then what is everyone's colossal problem with the mere premise?

El Al said that it would not put a policy in place to handle situations where male Haredim refuse to sit next to female passengers, but would instead attempt to satisfy passengers involved in such incidents on a case-by-case basis.

In February 2016, Renee Rabinowitz filed a successful lawsuit against El Al, after being involved in an incident where an ultra-Orthodox man refused to sit next to her on a flight from Newark International Airport to Tel Aviv and the flight attendants asked her to move seats. Later in 2018, the airline decided to immediately remove any passengers who refuse to sit next to a woman.

=== Continued operation of flights to Russia ===
Despite the international sanctions imposed on Russia due to its ongoing invasion of Ukraine, El Al continues to operate flights to and from Russia. This decision, which was carried out at the request of the Israeli government to enable Russian Jews to travel to Israel, has drawn criticism for indirectly supporting Russia's economy during its military aggression in Ukraine.

== Destinations ==
El Al serves destinations on four continents in 31 countries with a well-developed European network including the transcontinental nation of Russia. The airline serves a number of gateway cities in North America such as New York–JFK, Newark, Miami, Los Angeles, and Boston. They have also expanded their service to Asia such as Bangkok–Suvarnabhumi, Mumbai, Beijing–Capital, and Hong Kong. From its founding until 2020, El Al's inability to overfly Saudi Arabian airspace, along with that of several other Arab and Muslim countries, has reduced their ability to further expand their route network in Asia. In 2018, Saudi Arabia granted permission to Air India to fly a five times weekly flight from Tel Aviv to New Delhi using Saudi Arabian airspace. If Saudi Arabia did not allow El Al to use their airspace, El Al might have lost a large share of their Asian market due to other airlines having shorter and cheaper flights. However, Saudi Arabia opened their airspace to Israeli aircraft for the first time in September 2020. El Al also offers services to Johannesburg in South Africa and Zanzibar.

Prior to the COVID-19 pandemic in Israel, the airline had plans to perform experimental direct flights between Tel Aviv and Melbourne. The service would have been the airline's longest-ever direct flight and the first direct connection between Israel and Australia.

In June 2022, the airline announced that it would permanently terminate flights from Toronto–Pearson effective October 27, 2022. The decision ended an over-40-year presence in Canada. In response, a petition was launched on Change.org to try and reverse the decision. El Al also announced that it was cancelling its routes to Brussels Airport and Warsaw Chopin Airport.

In December 2022, the airline started to sell tickets to its highly anticipated route of Ben Gurion Airport to Tokyo-Narita Airport, which was inaugurated on March 2, 2023. The route was originally planned to launch in March 2020, but due to the COVID-19 global pandemic, the route was delayed until further notice.

On 14 March 2023, El Al and the Victoria state government signed a letter of intent, in which El Al intents to inaugurate direct flights to Melbourne Airport in Melbourne, Australia. While there is no exact date for the beginning of these flights, the letter of intent stated that these flights should begin by June 2024. These flights will be operated by the Boeing 787 Dreamliner and are expected to add 44,000 seats on flights to Melbourne per year. These flights will take 15 hours eastbound (Israel to Australia) and 17 hours westbound (Australia to Israel).

On 26 October 2023, El Al said it will cancel its seasonal routes (Dublin, Marseille, Tokyo) which were due to terminate in the October–November early due to the Gaza war and will delay the launch of its planned New Delhi and Mumbai routes until further notice. El Al said it plans to resume their seasonal routes in April 2024. One of the oldest El Al routes, the flights to Johannesburg, South Africa, was terminated in March 2024.

On 20 April 2026, as part of a visit of President of Argentina Javier Milei to Israel, El Al announced the launch of its longest scheduled route to date, connecting Ben Gurion Airport (TLV) in Israel to Ezeiza Airport (EZE) in Buenos Aires, Argentina. The route will have a flight time of 16 1/2 hours to Buenos Aires and 15 hours to Tel Aviv, with a route designed to avoid overflying particular countries. The new service is planned to start in November 2026 and will be operated twice weekly with Boeing 787-9 aircraft, configured to accommodate 271 passengers. Tickets will go on sale from May 2026.

In August 2026, the airline announced that it would be unable to start its planned three flights per week with Boeing 787-9 aircraft on the route between Ben Gurion Airport in Tel Aviv and Noi Bai International Airport (HAN) in Hanoi, scheduled to begin in October, as the airline was unable to obtain security clearances from Israeli security agencies under the authority of the Shin Bet.

The airline is re-establishing a three-trips-per-week schedule of 15-hour flights between Tel Aviv and San Francisco International Airport (SFO) in October 2026, resuming a route that it had operated starting in 2018 and ended in 2020 during the COVID-19 pandemic. The outbound leg to SFO will be El Al flight 49, marking the 1849 California Gold Rush and the San Francisco 49ers football team.

=== Codeshare agreements ===
El Al codeshares with the following airlines:

- Aerolíneas Argentinas
- Aeroméxico
- Air China
- Air France
- Air Serbia
- airBaltic
- Azerbaijan Airlines
- Delta Air Lines
- Ethiopian Airlines
- Etihad Airways
- Gulf Air
- Hong Kong Airlines
- Iberia
- JetBlue
- Kenya Airways
- KLM
- LATAM Brasil
- LOT Polish Airlines
- Porter Airlines
- Qantas
- Scandinavian Airlines
- Swiss International Air Lines
- TAP Air Portugal
- Thai Airways International
- TAROM
- Vietnam Airlines
- Virgin Atlantic

== Fleet ==
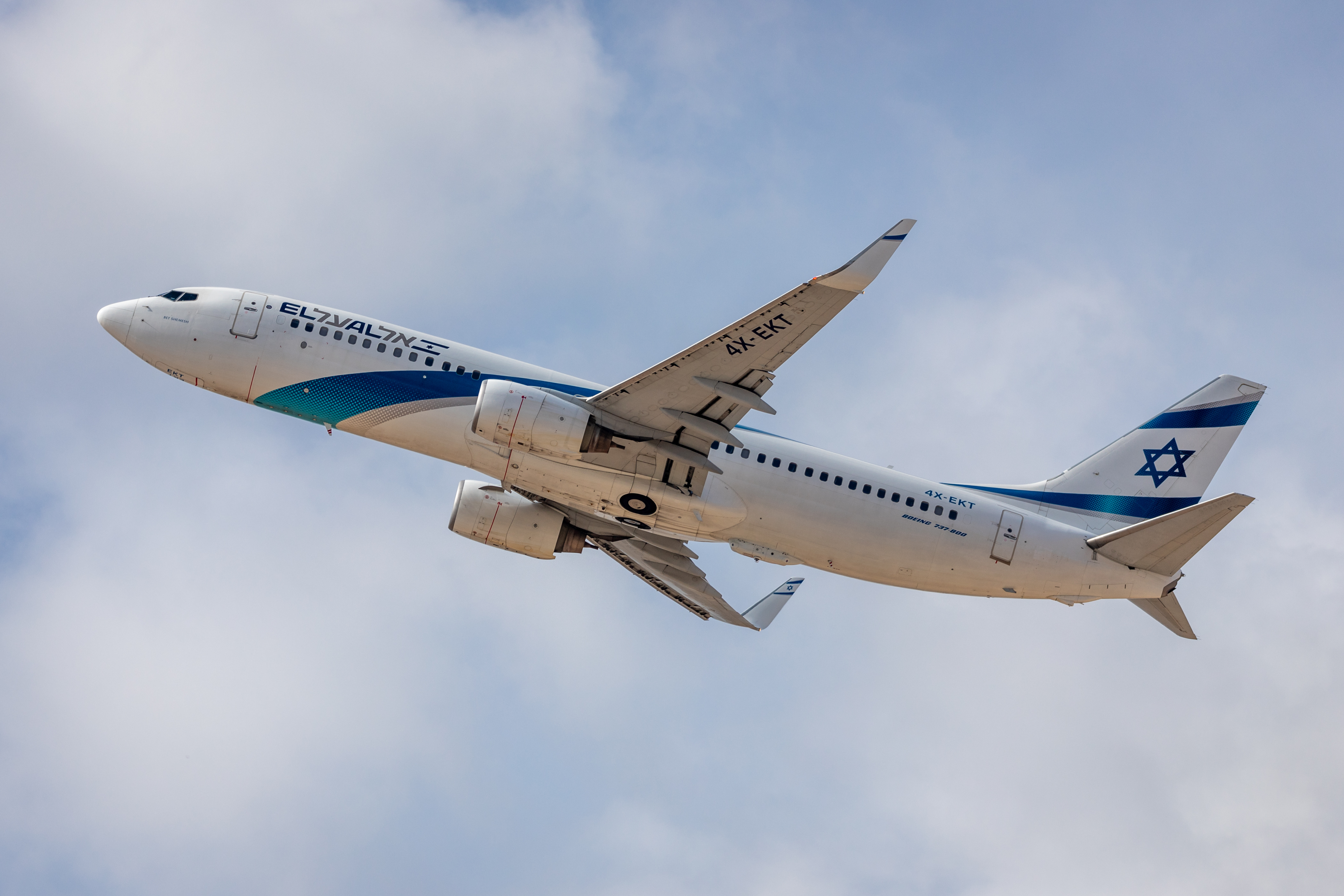
El Al Boeing 737-800

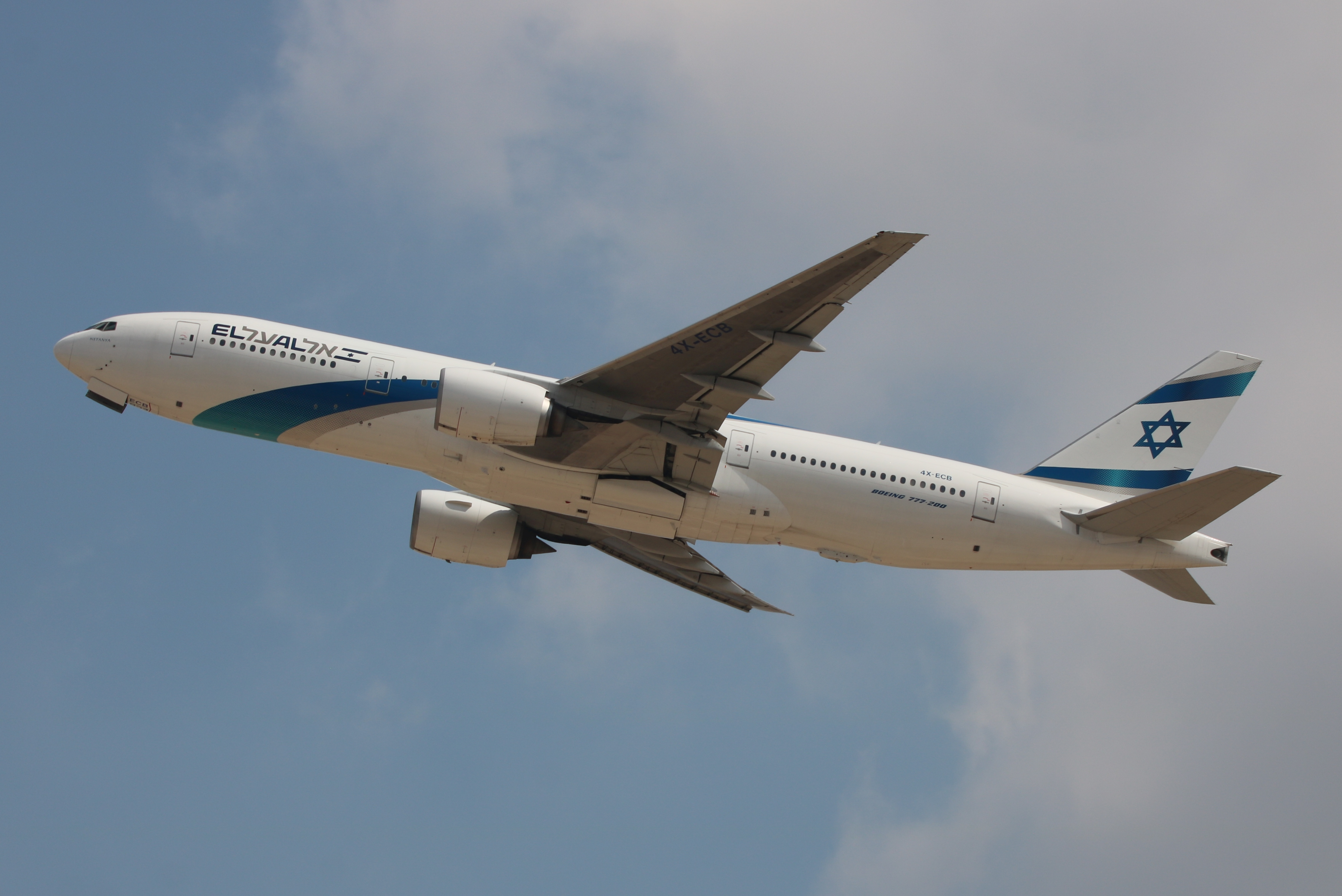
El Al Boeing 777-200ER

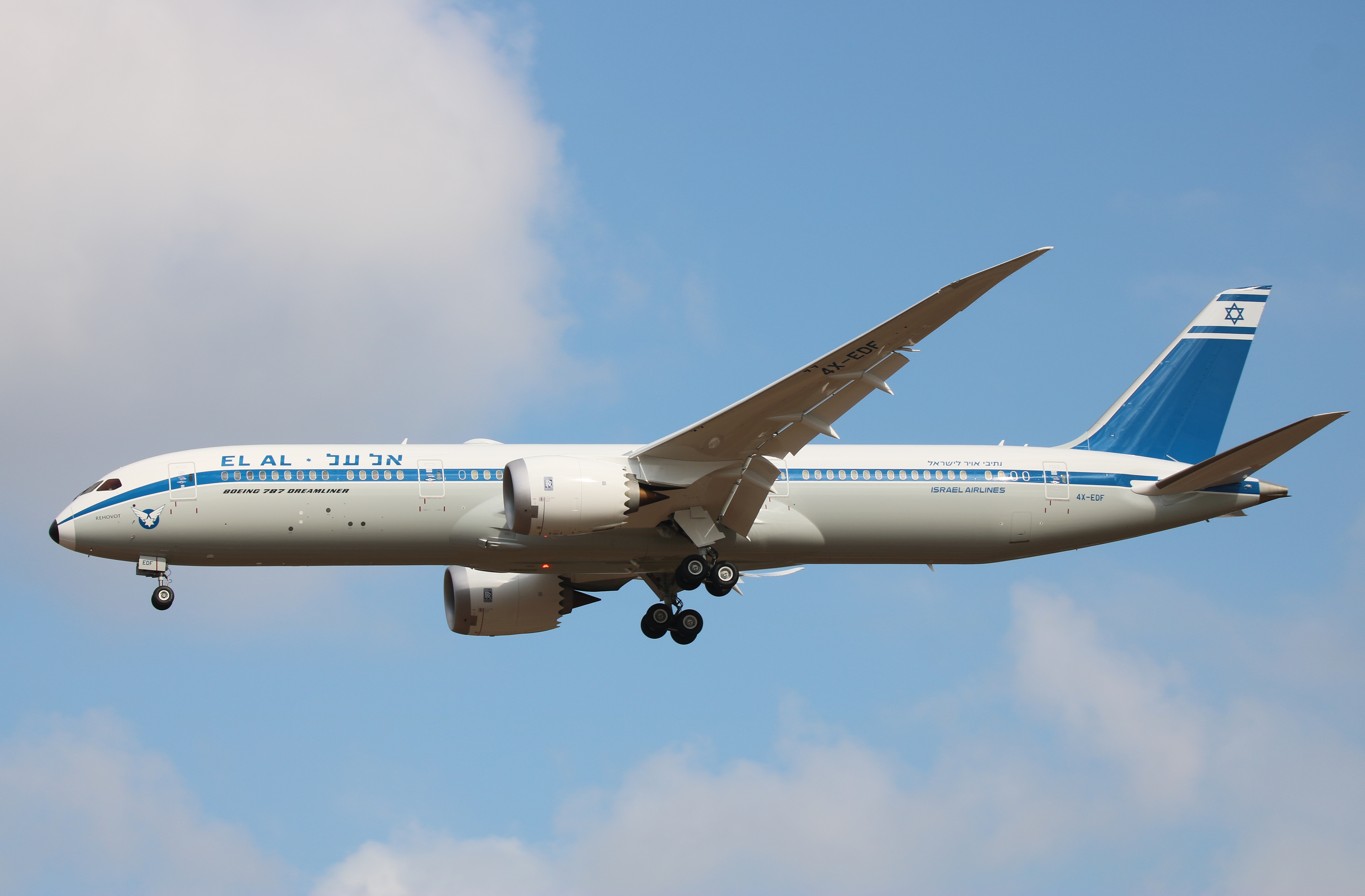
El Al Boeing 787-9 wearing a 1960s retro livery

=== Current fleet ===
As of December 2025, El Al operates an all-Boeing fleet composed of the following aircraft:

El Al fleet
Aircraft	In service	Orders	Passengers				Notes
Aircraft	In service	Orders	J	W	Y	Total	Notes
Boeing 737-800	14	—	16	—	150	166	To be retired and replaced by Boeing 737 MAX.
Boeing 737-800	2	—	—	—	189	189	Operated by Sun d'Or.
Boeing 737-900ER	8	—	16	—	159	175	
Boeing 737 MAX	—	20	TBA				Order with 11 options. Deliveries from 2028. To replace Boeing 737-800.
Boeing 777-200ER	6	—	28	32	253	313	New configuration, rolled out gradually in the 777 fleet between 2023 and 2026.
Boeing 787-8	4	—	20	35	183	238	
Boeing 787-9	12	7	32	35	204	271	Order with 6 options. Converted 6 purchase rights to firm order.
Boeing 787-9	1	7	30	—	263	293	Taken from an Air China order, retaining its interior configuration.
Boeing 787-10	—	4	TBA				Order converted from 787-9. To replace Boeing 777-200ER.
El Al Cargo fleet
Boeing 737-800BCF	1	—	Cargo				
Total	48	31					

=== Former fleet ===
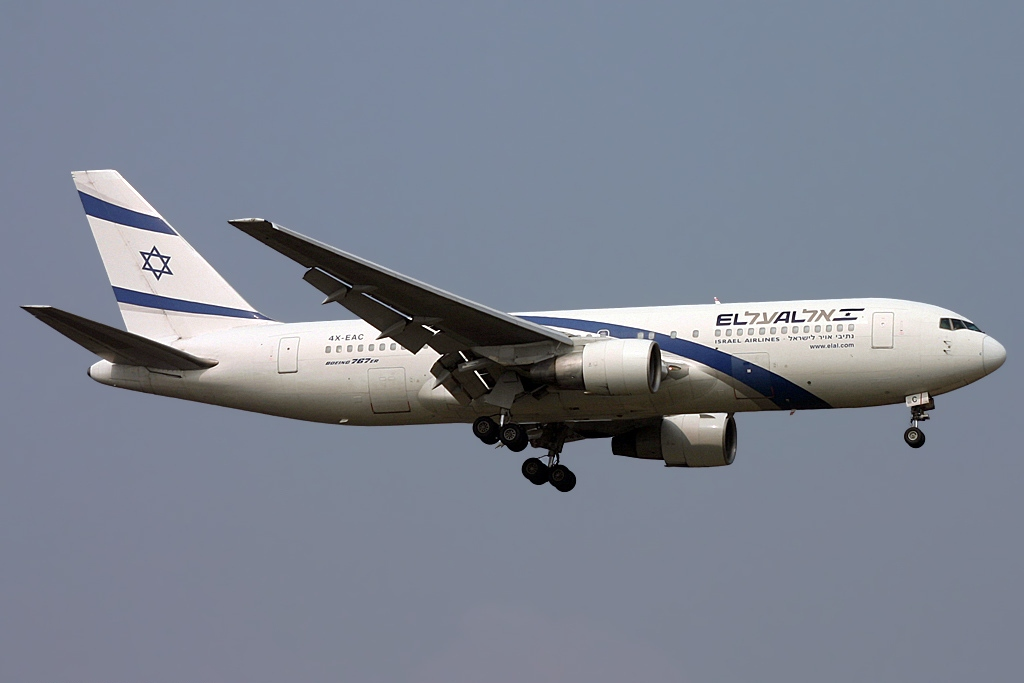
A former El Al Boeing 767-200ER. El Al was the launch customer for this variant of the Boeing 767.

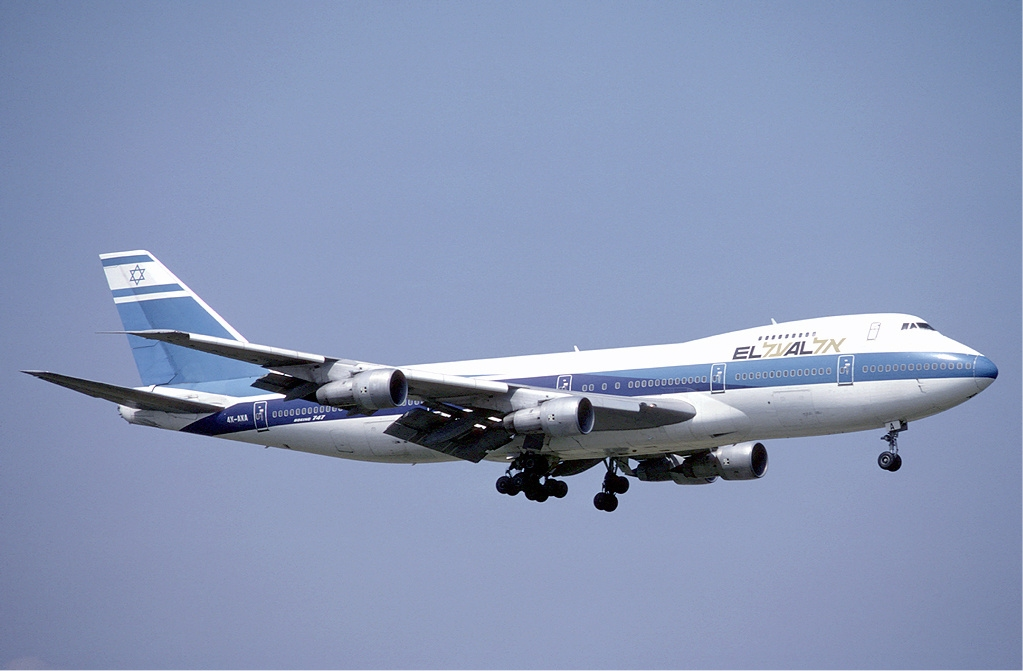
A former El Al Boeing 747-200B

El Al used to operate the following types of aircraft as well:

- Boeing 707
- Boeing 720
- Boeing 737-200
- Boeing 737-700
- Boeing 747-100
- Boeing 747-200
- Boeing 747-300
- Boeing 747-400
- Boeing 747-400F
- Boeing 757-200
- Boeing 767-200ER
- Boeing 767-300ER
- Bristol Britannia
- Curtiss C-46 Commando
- Douglas DC-4
- Lockheed Constellation
- McDonnell Douglas MD-11

=== Livery ===
El Al's livery features a white background, with a blue stripe with a thick silver border on the bottom that sweeps across the side of the aircraft near the wing, disappears over the top of the plane and reappears at the bottom of the tailfin. The El Al logo is part of the design, although it has been changed slightly since its introduction in 1999. El Al's historic, superseded livery, which was designed by Dan Reisinger in conjunction with the introduction of the Boeing 747 to El Al's fleet in the 1970s, featured a turquoise/navy blue stripe down the side of the aircraft, and a turquoise tailfin with the flag of Israel at the top. El Al's logo was featured above the front run of windows on each side of the plane in the turquoise/navy scheme. Most of El Al's aircraft are named for Israeli cities, such as Jerusalem, Tel Aviv, Beersheba, Haifa, and others. The larger the aircraft – the bigger or more populated the city it is named after. The cities' names are located near the nose of the plane beneath the cockpit windows. One aircraft, a Boeing 787-9 Dreamliner, is painted in the livery that El Al used in the 1960s and 1970s as part of the airline's 70th year of operations, using a gray belly, white roof with El Al titles, a blue cheatline, and the flag of Israel on the vertical stabilizer that was introduced with the introduction of the Boeing 707 to the El Al fleet.

By contrast, El Al's cargo plane livery in the past lacks the painting of Israel's flag and its airline identity; only the word "Cargo" appears on the fuselage. Subsequently, the most recent cargo plane livery (a now retired Boeing 747-400F) was painted white except for the airline's name and "Cargo".

== Services ==
=== Frequent flyer program ===
Matmid is El Al's present frequent flyer program. King David club cards (red) were issued 1991. It was re-launched in 2004 following the merger of El Al's previous frequent flyer programs. It has five tiers: Matmid, Matmid Silver, Matmid Gold, Matmid Platinum and Matmid TOP Platinum. Points accumulated in the program entitle members to bonus tickets, flight upgrades, and discounts on car rentals, hotel stays, and other products and services.

Points are awarded for travel with El Al flights, partner airlines, as well as for nights at partner hotels and for credit card purchases. Matmid points can be collected on most flights operated by South African Airways, Sun D'Or, Qantas and limited Aeroméxico, Delta, Virgin Atlantic, Air France, KLM and SAS flights.

=== Lounge ===
The King David Lounge is the name adopted by El Al for special airport lounges that serve the airline's premium class passengers. In 2007, there were six King David Lounges worldwide at the key airports at Ben Gurion International Airport, John F. Kennedy International Airport in New York, Newark Liberty International Airport, Paris-Charles de Gaulle Airport, London Heathrow Airport and Los Angeles International Airport; by 2025, these were reduced to just one lounge at Ben Gurion airport, with El Al passengers in foreign airports having to use the lounges of other airlines (predominantly those in the SkyTeam alliance, such as Delta Air Lines, SAS and Virgin Atlantic). The King David Lounge offers drinks, snacks, newspapers and magazines, and free Wi-Fi internet access, and is equipped with a telephone, shower facilities and a spa; until the retirement of First Class in 2019, it also had a separate section for first-class passengers.

=== Cabin ===
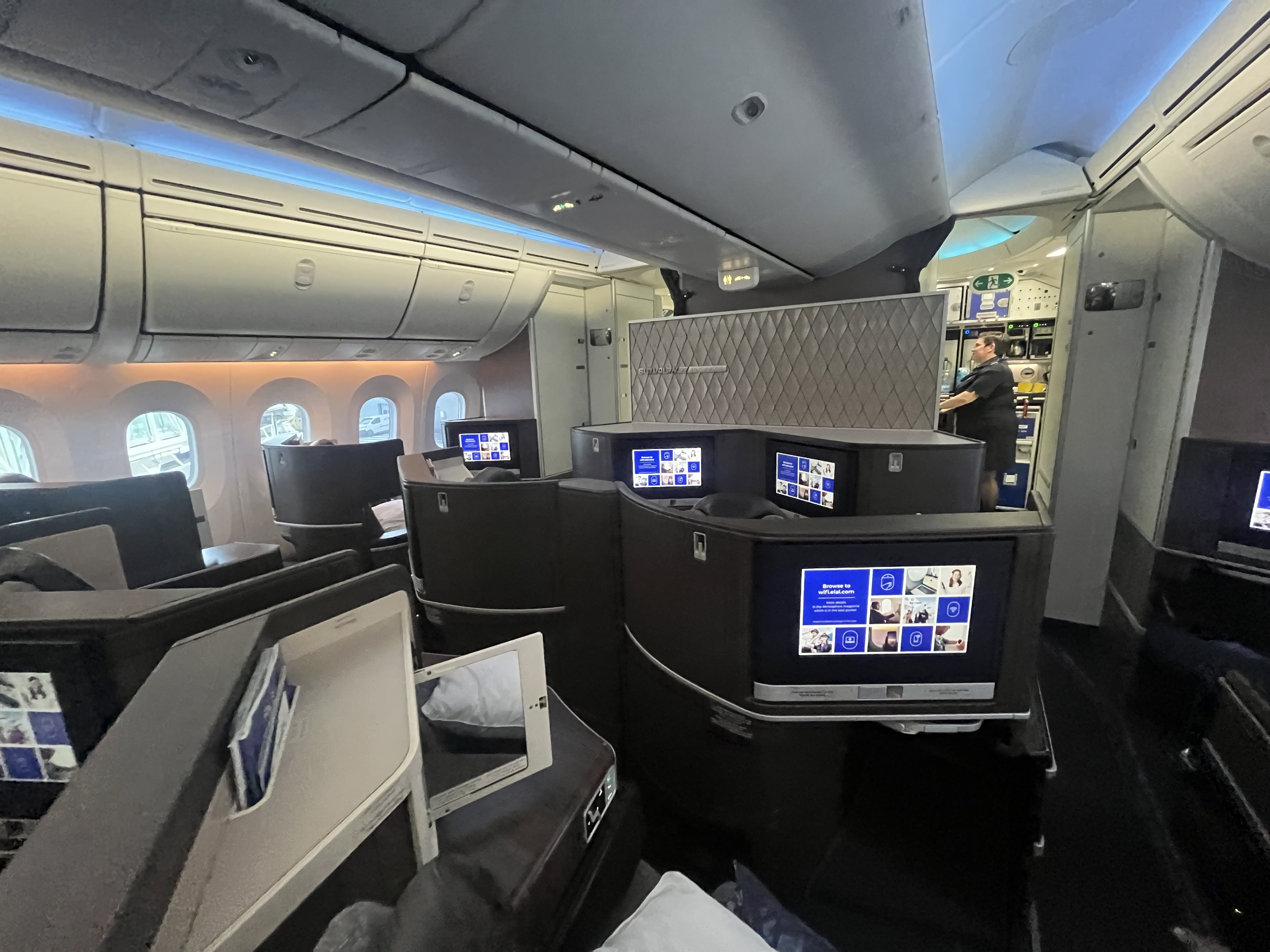
Long-haul business class cabin on an El Al Boeing 787-8

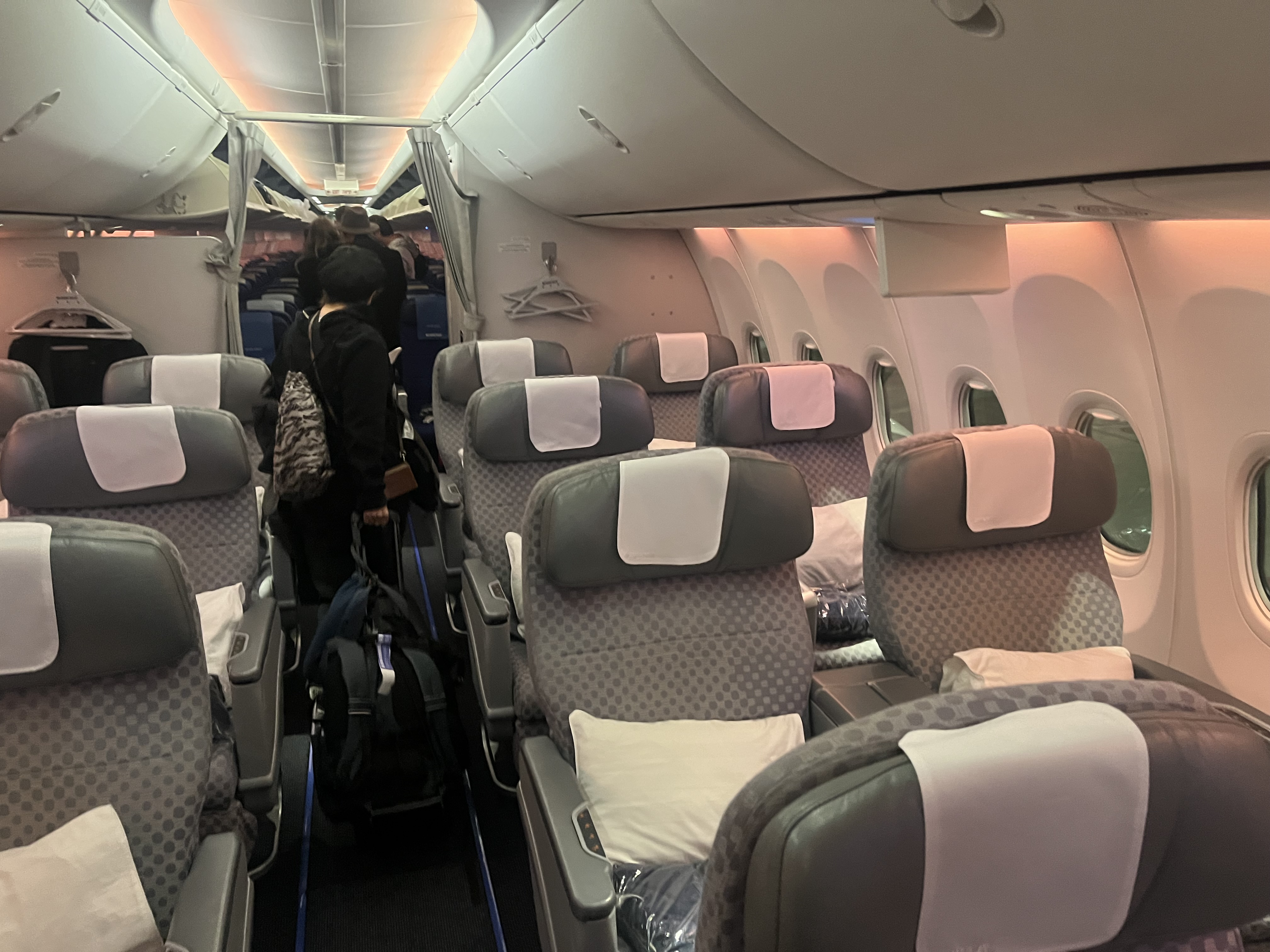
Short-haul business class cabin on an El Al Boeing 737-900

El Al offers three types of classes on its planes:

- Business class – on all planes (type of business seat changes with type of aircraft).
  - On the 787 and 777 – Business class is in a 1-2-1 configuration, featuring lie-flat seats in a staggered layout. Business class on the 777 has a seat pitch of 42-43" pitch, 80" bed length, and 21" width; on the 787, the dimensions are 42-43" pitch, 78" bed length, and 21" width.
  - On the 737 – Business class is in a 2-2 configuration, with recliner seats having a 42-44" pitch and 20.5" width. El Al's business class has dedicated seats (similarly to domestic first class in North America), as opposed to economy class seats with a blocked middle seat as common in short-haul business class in European airliners.
- Premium economy class – on the 787 and 777. On the 777, Premium economy is in a 2-4-2 configuration, with a seat pitch of 38" and 20" width. On the 787, the seats are in a 2-3-2 configuration, with dimensions of 38" pitch and 18.5" width.
- Economy class – All planes. Economy class has a seat pitch of 31" (32" on the 737) and 17" seat width .

=== In-flight entertainment and Wi-Fi ===
Personal AVOD screens are provided on all Boeing 777-200ERs and Boeing 787s, which also have a Wi-Fi network enabling access to the Internet using Viasat technology. Internet access is only available on flights to Europe, North America, and the Middle East, due to coverage restrictions.

AVOD Streaming via a closed Wi-Fi network (i.e. without internet access) is provided on all Boeing 737s, where there are no personal AVOD screens.

== Accidents and incidents ==
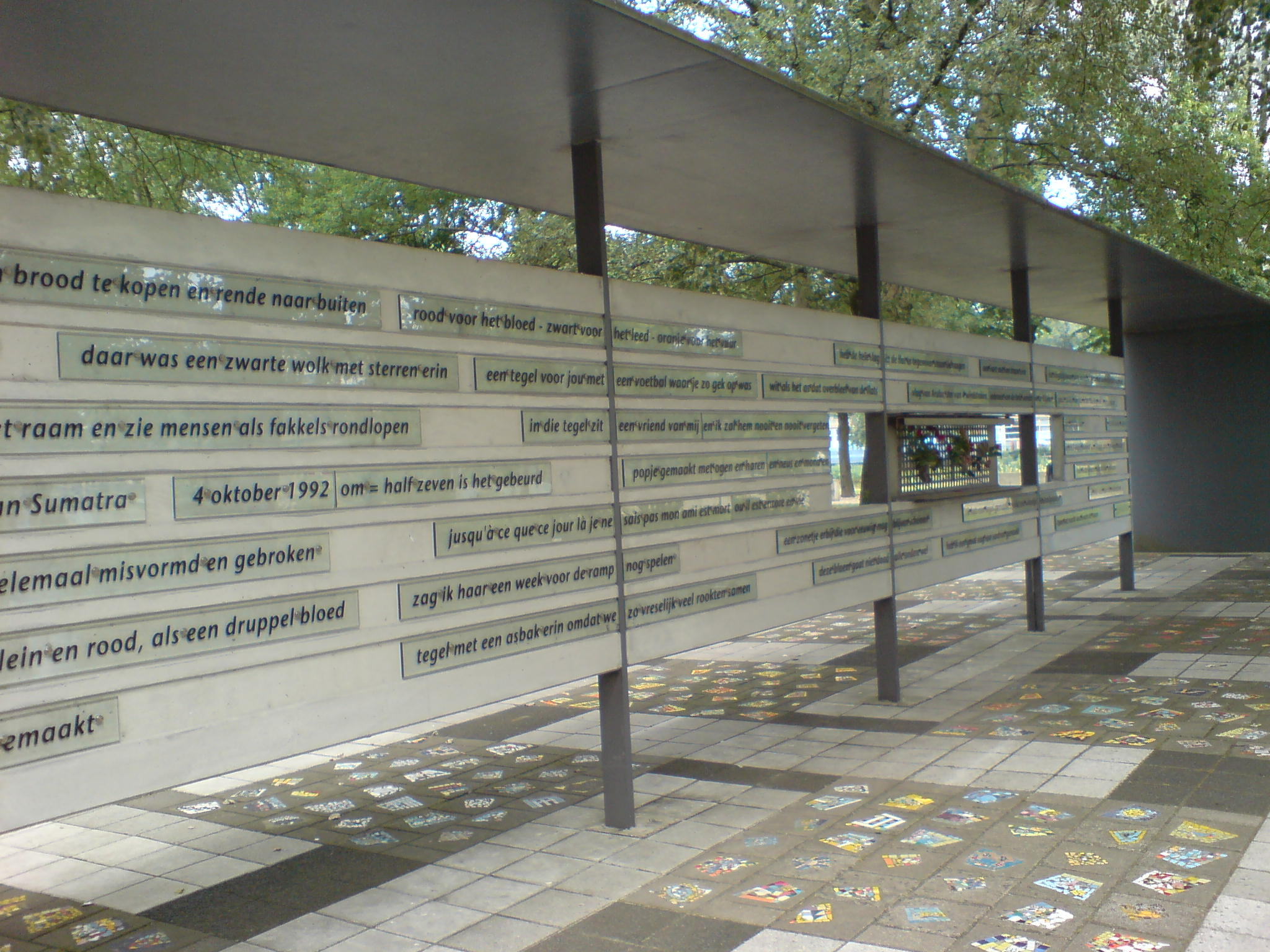
Monument for the Bijlmer disaster, Amsterdam of 4 October 1992. The monument was designed by architect Herman Hertzberger together with survivors.

Over its history, El Al has been involved in the following incidents and accidents, involving both the aircraft actually operated by the airline and its outstations abroad. Most of these incidents are motivated by the Israeli-Palestinian conflict, particularly Palestinian terrorism against the airline in the period between 1968 and 1990, and so incidents are separated by terrorist, politically-motivated non-terrorist, and non-politically-motivated incidents. Despite these attacks, El Al has not lost a passenger on any passenger flight since 1955.

=== Terrorist attacks and incidents ===
- On 23 July 1968, El Al Flight 426 hijacking, operated by a Boeing 707-458C en route from London to Tel Aviv via Rome, registered 4X-ATA, was hijacked by three members of the Popular Front for the Liberation of Palestine (PFLP) shortly after take-off from Rome-Fiumicino airport and forcibly diverted to Algiers. The hijacking ended after 40 days and is considered to be the only successful hijacking involving an El Al jet.
- On 18 February 1969, El Al Flight 432 attack, operated Boeing 720-058B, registered 4X-ABB, was attacked at Zurich Airport by members of the PFLP while taxiing for takeoff en route from Amsterdam to Tel Aviv, via a Zurich intermediate stop. Seven people were wounded including the copilot who later died from his wounds. In a firefight involving security personnel aboard the aircraft, one hijacker was killed, while the others were arrested. The hijackers were later put on trial in Winterthur, Switzerland but were released following the Dawson's Field hijackings one year later.
- On 6 September 1970, El Al Flight 219 from Tel Aviv to New York, with a stopover in Amsterdam, operated by a Boeing 707-458C registered 4X-ATB, was the target of an attempted hijacking by Leila Khaled and Patrick Argüello, members of the Sandinistas working in concert with the PLFP after taking off from Amsterdam. The hijacking was meant to be one of the Dawson's Field hijackings, but it was thwarted by the pilots, cabin crew and the on-board air marshals. The aircraft diverted to Heathrow Airport, where Argüello and Khaled were turned over to British authorities; Argüello, who was shot earlier, died en route to a hospital.
- On 16 August 1972, a bomb exploded in the luggage compartment of El Al Flight 444 shortly after takeoff from Rome. The plane returned to Rome safely and no casualties were recorded. The bomb had been hidden in the luggage of two British nationals who had the bombs placed there by Arab acquaintances.
- In January 1975, several men, including Carlos the Jackal, made unsuccessful attempts to destroy an El Al airliner parked at Paris Orly Airport.
- On 27 December 1985, guerrillas of the Fatah Revolutionary Council attacked El Al and TWA ticket counters at Rome and Vienna's airports, killing 18 people.
- A terrorist attack was foiled on 18 April 1986 in what became known as the Hindawi Affair. Anne-Marie Murphy was about to board an El Al flight at London's Heathrow airport when her bag was found to contain three pounds of plastic explosives. These had been planted by her fiancé Nezar Hindawi, who was booked on a different flight. Hindawi was jailed for 45 years. There was evidence that Syrian officials were involved and as a result, Britain cut off diplomatic relations with Syria.
- On 4 July 2002, Hesham Mohamed Hadayet shot six Israeli passengers at El Al's ticket counter at Los Angeles International Airport before he was shot and killed by an El Al security guard. Two of the victims died. Although not linked to any terrorist group, Hadayet, an Egyptian, espoused anti-Israeli views and was opposed to US policy in the Middle East. The US Federal Bureau of Investigation classified the shooting as a terrorist act, one of the few on US soil since the September 11, 2001 attacks.
- On 17 November 2002, El Al Flight 581, a flight operated by a Boeing 757-258 from Tel Aviv to Istanbul, registered 4X-EBS, was the scene of an attempted hijacking by Tawfiq Fukra. Fukra attempted to break into the cockpit in order to fly the aircraft back to Israel and crash it into a building. He was apprehended by on-board security personnel.

=== Politically-motivated incidents which are not terrorist attacks ===
- In February 2026, El Al Flight LY6 flight from Los Angeles International Airport to Tel Aviv was delayed after "Free Palestine" stickers were found attached to around 140 checked suitcases, prompting airline staff to remove the luggage and initiate individual security checks to rule out explosives before departure. The scheduled departure was delayed by nearly two hours and the flight eventually departed without the affected bags, which were later sent on subsequent flight.

=== Other accidents and incidents ===
- On 24 November 1951, a Douglas DC-4, registered 4X-ADN, on a cargo flight from Tel Aviv to Amsterdam via Zurich crashed on approach to Zürich, killing 6 crew members.
- On 27 July 1955, a Lockheed Constellation operating El Al Flight 402, registered 4X-AKC, was shot down by two Bulgarian Air Force fighter jets over Blagoevgrad, near Sofia, Bulgaria, after it strayed into Bulgarian airspace in rough weather. All 58 passengers and crew were killed.
- On 4 October 1992, El Al Flight 1862, a cargo flight from New York to Tel Aviv via Amsterdam, operated by a Boeing 747-258F cargo plane registered 4X-AXG, crashed into two highrise apartment buildings in Bijlmermeer, a neighborhood of Amsterdam, shortly after takeoff and while attempting to return to Amsterdam. The crash was caused by structural failure of the fuse pins on the #3 engine, causing that engine to detach from the aircraft, knocking off the #4 engine with it. The three crew members, one passenger in a jump seat, and 39 people on the ground were killed.

== Notable employees ==
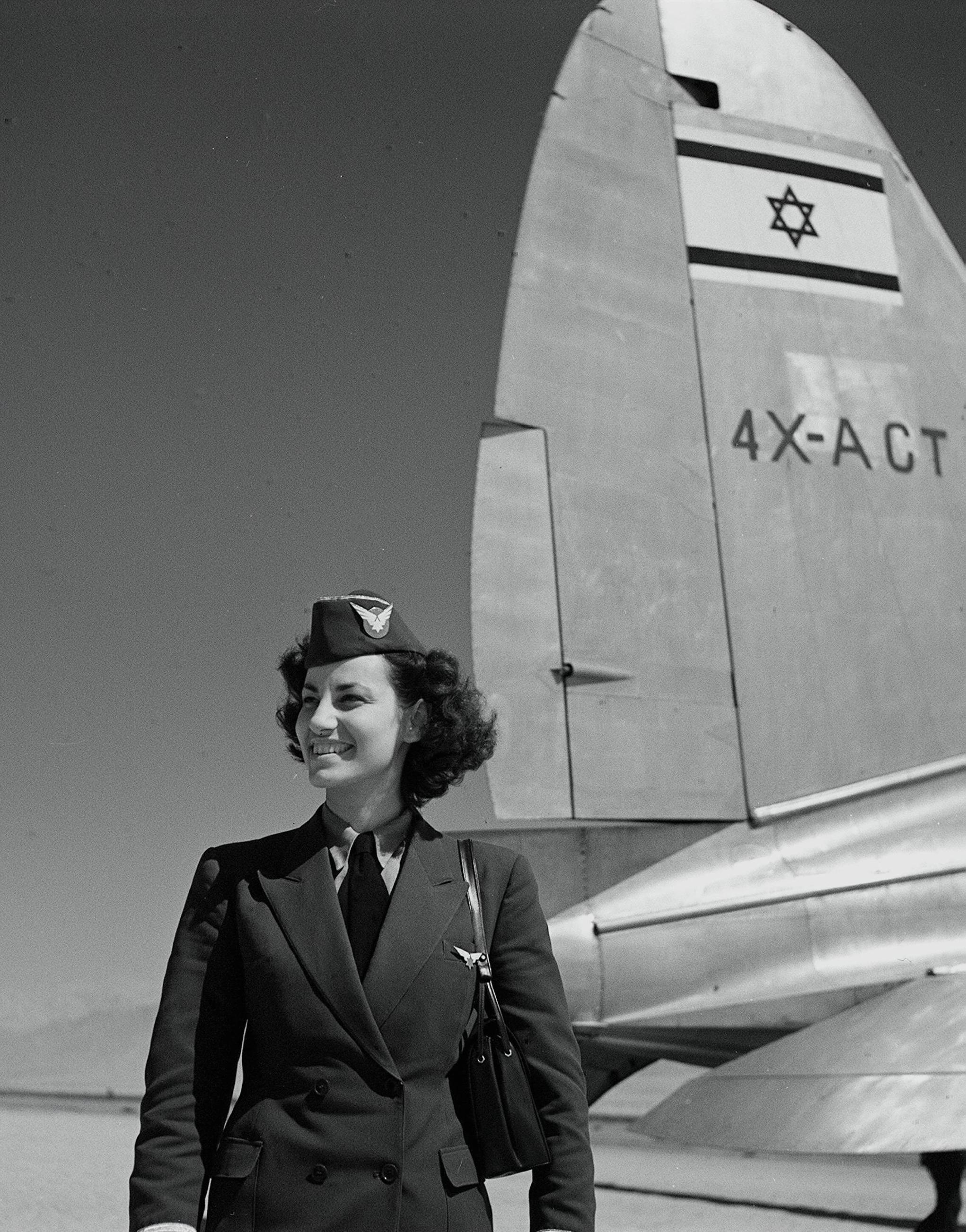
El Al flight attendant standing next to a Curtiss C-46 (1950)

=== Management ===
- Ephraim Ben-Artzi – commander of the Quartermasters Directorate, served as El Al CEO 1956–1967
- Mordechai Hod – commander of the Israeli Air Force during the 1967 Six-Day War, served as El Al CEO 1977–1979
- Eliezer Shkedi – former commander of the Israeli Air Force, served as El Al CEO 2010–2014

=== Pilots ===
- Pinchas Ben-Porat – Palmach member, one of Israel's first aviators
- Eliezer Cohen – politician
- Giora Epstein – Israeli Air Force pilot, flying ace
- Yoav Kish – politician
- Abie Nathan – humanitarian and peace activist

=== Flight attendants ===
- Gali Atari – singer and actress, winner of the 1979 Eurovision Song Contest
- Janna Gur – food writer, editor and cook book author
- Miki Haimovich – anchorwoman, television presenter
- Adir Miller – actor, screenwriter and comedian
- Sara Netanyahu – wife of Israeli Prime Minister Benjamin Netanyahu
- Alma Zack – actress

== See also ==
- Transport in Israel

== Bibliography ==
Wigton, Don C., ed. (1963). "El Al Israel Airlines". From Jenny to Jet: Pictorial Histories of the World's Great Airlines. Los Angeles: Floyd Clymer. pp. 65–67. LCCN 63020881.

- Sherman A. To the skies-The El Al story. Bantam Books. New York. 1972
- Sherman A. The El Al story. Vallentine, Mitchell & Co. Ltd. London, 1973
- Sherman A. El Al-Challenging in the skies. Modan. Tel Aviv. 1981
- Goldman M.G. El Al-Star in the sky. World Transport Press. 1990
- Goldman M.G. El Al-Israel's flying star. Airways International Inc. Sandpoint (ID). 2008
