= IASA =

IASA may refer to:

- Improving America's Schools Act of 1994
- Institución Atlética Sud América, a football club from Montevideo in Uruguay
- International Association of Sound and Audiovisual Archives
- International Aviation Safety Assessment Program, of the US FAA
- Irish Amateur Swimming Association
- Israel Arts and Science Academy, Jerusalem
