= El Al Flight 426 =

Passenger flight hijacked in 1968

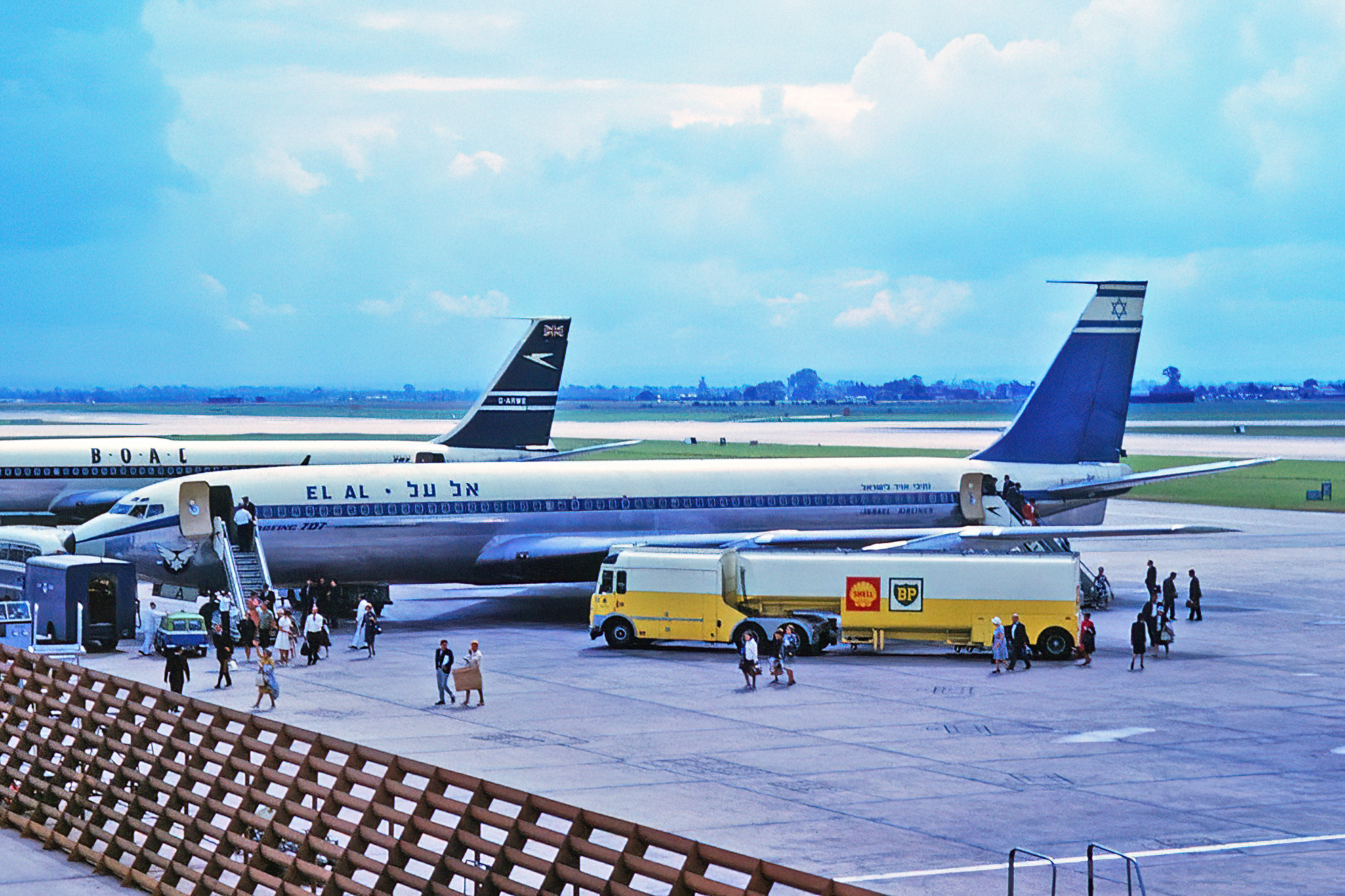
- 4X-ATA, the aircraft involved in the hijacking

Hijacking
- Date: 23 July 1968
- Summary: Hijacking

Aircraft
- Aircraft type: Boeing 707–458
- Operator: El Al
- IATA flight No.: LY426
- ICAO flight No.: ELY426
- Call sign: ELAL 426
- Registration: 4X-ATA
- Flight origin: London Heathrow Airport
- Stopover: Rome Leonardo da Vinci-Fiumicino Airport
- Destination: Lod Airport (renamed Ben Gurion International Airport)
- Occupants: 48
- Passengers: 38 (Including 3 hijackers)
- Crew: 10
- Fatalities: 0
- Survivors: 48 (Including 3 hijackers)

El Al Flight 426 was an El Al Boeing 707 passenger flight hijacked on 23 July 1968 by three members of the Popular Front for the Liberation of Palestine (PFLP), setting off a wave of hijackings by the PFLP.

== Overview ==
El Al Flight 426, on a Boeing 707-458, was scheduled to fly from Leonardo da Vinci-Fiumicino Airport in Rome to Lod Airport, now known as Ben Gurion International Airport, in Tel Aviv.

After the aircraft departed Rome, the pilots requested coffee from the cabin crew. As the coffee was being brought up to the pilots, two hijackers associated with the Popular Front for the Liberation of Palestine (PFLP) forced their way through the door to the flight deck. One of them clubbed the flight engineer with the butt of his pistol and ordered the plane to fly to Algiers. The remaining hijacker threatened the passengers with a pistol and an unpinned hand grenade.

When the plane landed at Dar El Beida, Algerian authorities grounded the plane. The following day they sent all non-Israeli passengers to France on Air Algérie Caravelle jets. Ten women and children were released over the weekend. The remaining 12 Israeli passengers, and the crew of 10 were held as hostages for the remainder of the hijacking.

The hijackers were equipped with Iranian and Indian passports. The hijackers were carefully chosen by the PFLP because of their occupations (a pilot, an army officer, and a karate teacher).

The Israeli and Algerian governments negotiated the return of the hostages and plane through diplomatic channels. Five weeks later, everyone was released in exchange for 16 convicted Arab prisoners. According to the BBC, lasting 40 days, it was the longest hijacking of a commercial flight.

== Impact ==
Scholars of political science and terrorism studies have characterized the hijacking as a new era of terrorism as the first aviation attack motivated by political aims. According to David C. Rapoport, Professor Emeritus of Political Science at University of California, Los Angeles (UCLA), the modern wave of left-wing terrorism began with the hijacking of the El Al Flight 426 in the context of the political unrest of 1968.

Israel's airport security measures were instituted in 1968 after the hijacking. Between 1968 and 1979, Palestinian militant organizations made 11 attempts to hijack Israeli airplanes, all of them failing.

Pilot Oded Abarbanell later wrote his account of the hijacking.

== See also ==
- List of aircraft hijackings
- Airport security
- Lufthansa Flight 181
- Operation Entebbe
