= Eli Rozenberg =

Israeli American entrepreneur (born 1993)

- Born: 1993 (age 32–33); Monsey, New York, US
- Occupation: Head of Kanfei Nesharim
- Years active: 2020-present
- Known for: Controlling shareholder of Israeli airline El Al

Eli Rozenberg (born 1993) is an Israeli American entrepreneur, who is the controlling shareholder of Israeli airline company El Al with a 42.85% stake in the company.

== Early life ==
Eli Rozenberg was born in 1993 in Monsey, New York. His father is Kenny Rozenberg, the founder of the US Centers Health Care nursing home chain. Growing up in a Modern Orthodox household, he attended the Marsha Stern Talmudical Academy for high school.

== Career ==
In 2020 Rozenberg's company, Kanfei Nesharim, bought a 42.85% stake in El Al after the company needed to raise capital because of their increasing debt. Israeli law requires that the owner of El Al be an Israeli, and while Rozenberg is Israeli (in addition to his American citizenship), this caused some concern amongst the board of the company, because they were afraid that this would be a front for his father to control the airline, due to him giving his son a $100 million loan to purchase the airline.

Rozenberg has clarified that he will be calling the shots and that his father will not be involved in any decisions. Additionally, Rozenberg will not be allowed to receive any more loans from his father nor sell any of his shares to his father. Another caveat is that anyone Rozenberg wants to make CEO or add to the board must have at least 5 years of experience in the aviation industry.
