= International Aviation Safety Assessment Program =

Federal Aviation Administration program

The International Aviation Safety Assessment Program (IASA Program) is a program established by the U.S. Federal Aviation Administration (FAA) in 1992. The program is designed to evaluate the ability of a country's civil aviation authority or other regulatory body to adhere to international aviation safety standards and recommended practices for personnel licensing, aircraft operations and aircraft airworthiness.

Regulatory authorities in any sovereign country are obliged under the Chicago Convention to exercise regulatory oversight over air carriers within the state. Such international standards and recommended practices are laid down by the United Nations' technical agency for aviation, the International Civil Aviation Organization (ICAO).

== History of the IASA Program ==
In the aftermath of the January 25, 1990, crash of Avianca flight 52 on Long Island, New York, questions emerged about how the FAA conducted safety oversight of foreign air carriers flying into the United States. In response to a five-part Newsday series on the poor safety record of some foreign airlines that appeared in December 1990, the FAA established the IASA program in 1992.

== IASA Category Ratings ==
Following an IASA audit, a country is assigned one of two ratings:

- Category 1 (Meets ICAO standards): The FAA has assessed the country's civil aviation authority and determined that it licenses aviation personnel and oversees air carrier operations and airworthiness in accordance with ICAO aviation safety standards; or
- Category 2 (Does not meet ICAO standards): The FAA has assessed the country's civil aviation authority and determined that it does not provide safety oversight of its air carrier operators in accordance with the minimum safety oversight standards established by ICAO.

Carriers from Category 2 countries are allowed to continue operating to the United States as before the assessment, but are not allowed to expand their service to the US or codeshare with US carriers. Additionally, such carriers may be subject to heightened ramp inspections.

== Current ratings ==
IASA Program Results as of 18 April 2025
Country	Rating
Argentina	1
Aruba	1
Australia	1
Austria	1
Azerbaijan	1
Bahamas	1
Bahrain	1
Bangladesh	2
Belgium	1
Bermuda	1
Bolivia	1
Brazil	1
Bulgaria	1
Canada	1
Cabo Verde	1
Cayman Islands	1
Chile	1
China	1
Colombia	1
Costa Rica	1
Croatia	1
Czech Republic	1
Denmark incl. the Faroe Islands	1
Dominican Republic	1
Ecuador	1
Egypt	1
El Salvador	1
Ethiopia	1
Fiji	1
Finland	1
France incl. Guadeloupe, French Polynesia	1
Germany	1
Greece	1
Hong Kong	1
Iceland	1
India	1
Ireland	1
Israel	1
Italy	1
Japan	1
Jordan	1
Kenya	1
Kuwait	1
Latvia	1
Lithuania	1
Luxembourg	1
Malaysia	1
Malta	1
Mexico	1
Morocco	1
Netherlands incl. Bonaire, Saba, St. Eustatius	1
New Zealand	1
Norway	1
Organization of Eastern Caribbean States; Eastern Caribbean Civil Aviation Authority members: Antigua and Barbuda, Dominica, Grenada, St. Lucia, St. Vincent and The Grenadines, St. Kitts and Nevis	2
Panama	1
Peru	1
Philippines	1
Poland	1
Portugal	1
Qatar	1
South Korea	1
Romania	1
Russia	2
Rwanda	1
Samoa	1
San Marino	1
Saudi Arabia	1
Serbia	1
Singapore	1
South Africa	1
Spain	1
Suriname	1
Sweden	1
Switzerland	1
Taiwan	1
Thailand	1
Trinidad and Tobago	1
Turkey	1
Ukraine	1
United Arab Emirates	1
the United Kingdom incl. Anguilla, British Virgin Islands, Montserrat, Turks and Caicos	1
Uzbekistan	1
Venezuela	2
Vietnam	1
