= List of airlines of Lebanon =

This is a list of currently operating and former airlines in Lebanon.

== Scheduled airlines ==
Airline	Image	IATA	ICAO	Callsign	Commenced operations	Notes
Middle East Airlines		ME	MEA	CEDAR JET	1945	

== Defunct airlines ==
This is a list of defunct airlines of Lebanon.

Airline	Image	IATA	ICAO	Callsign	Commenced operations	Ceased operations	Notes
Air-Liban					1951	1965	Taken over by Middle East Airlines in 1963 and fully merged in 1965.
Berytos Airlines			BYR		2003	2008	
Blue Sky Aviation			GIW		2006	2009	
Caledonian Airlines							Associated with Caledonian Airlines, Inc in Pennsylvania.
Cirrus Middle East			JTI		2005	2007	Rebranded as ImperialJet
EasyFly					2010	2010	Rebranded as Emerald Jets
Flying Carpet Airlines		7Y	FCR	FLYING CARPET	2001	2009	Rebranded as Med Airways
Globe Jet			GJA		2004	2007	
ImperialJet			JTI;IMJ		2007	2009	
Lebanese International Airways		LQ	LIA		1966	1970	31% interest acquired in 1968 against payment for CV-990As. Taken over by Middle East Airlines Air Liban following the 1968 Israeli raid on Lebanon which destroyed most of the fleet.
MEA		ME		Middle East AL	1945	1963	Renamed Middle East Airlines
Med Airways		7Y	MED	FLYING CARPET	2009	2015	
MenaJet		IM	MNJ	MENAJET	2002	2010	
TMA Cargo		N2	TMA	TANGO LIMA	1953	2014	
Wings of Lebanon		W7	WLB	WINGS LEBANON	2006	2020	IOSA certified in January 2019. Suspended operations on 27/3/20 due to COVID-19; re-started on 11/6/20. Suspended again operations on 26/8/20.

== See also ==
- List of airlines
- List of defunct airlines of Asia
- List of airports in Lebanon
