= Fighter Weapons School RSAF =

Fighter Weapons School RSAF (Weapons & Tactics School)
- Active: Unknown-present
- Country: Saudi Arabia
- Branch: Royal Saudi Air Force
- Type: Training unit
- Base: King Abdulaziz Air Base
- Aircraft: Panavia Tornado IDS; McDonnell Douglas F-15SA Strike Eagle

Fighter Weapons School is a training unit of the Royal Saudi Air Force that operates the Panavia Tornado IDS and the McDonnell Douglas F-15SA Strike Eagle at King Abdulaziz Air Base, Dhahran, Eastern Province, in Saudi Arabia within RSAF 11 Wing.
