= Abdullah Al-Joud =

Saudi Arabian long-distance runner

Personal information
- Full name: Abdullah Abdulaziz Al-Joud
- Nationality: Saudi Arabian
- Born: 7 July 1975 (age 50) Al-Thuqbah, Eastern Province, Saudi Arabia

Sport
- Sport: Track and field
- Event: 5000 metres

Achievements and titles
- Personal best(s): 3000 m: 7:49.04 (2010); 5000 m: 13:11.61 (2012); Half Marathon: 1:02:58 (2014)

Abdullah Abdulaziz Al-Joud (Arabic: عبد الله الجود; born July 7, 1975, in Al-Thuqbah) is a Saudi Arabian long-distance runner. At the 2012 Summer Olympics, he competed in the Men's 5000 metres, finishing 39th overall in Round 1, failing to qualify for the final. He finished 48th overall at the world half marathon championships in 2014 with a national record of 1:02.58. He was the first Saudi athlete to compete in the world half marathon championships. Abdullah was coached to a competitive level (2004-2015) by UK and Irish coaches Ian Wilson and Teresa Wilson.
