= 7Y =

7Y or 7-Y may refer to:

- 7 years
- 7Y, the IATA airline code for the Latvian company Med Airways
- Ford 7Y, a Ford model built in the United Kingdom between 1938 and 1939
- 7Y, the pseudo ISO (country) Code 7Y has to be specified for items like European Financial Stability Facility (EFSF) in a separate designated country column (pseudo ISO code 7Y, country code 925).

== See also ==
- Y7 (disambiguation)
