= United Nations Security Council Resolution 262 =

UN Security Council Resolution 262
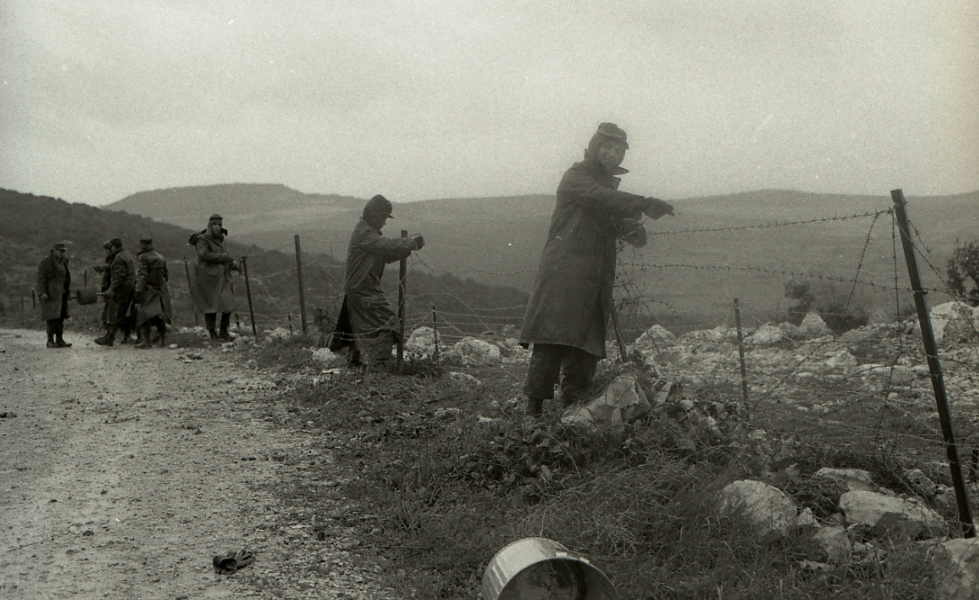
- Lebanese border
- Date: December 31 1968
- Meeting no.: 1462
- Code: S/RES/262 (Document)
- Subject: The situation in the Middle East
- Voting summary: 15 voted for; None voted against; None abstained
- Result: Adopted

Security Council composition
- Permanent members: China; France; Soviet Union; United Kingdom; United States
- Non-permanent members: Algeria; Brazil; Canada; Denmark; Ethiopia; Hungary; India; Pakistan; Paraguay; Senegal

United Nations Security Council Resolution 262 was adopted unanimously on December 31, 1968. After hearing statements from Israel and Lebanon, the Council condemned Israel for its premeditated military action in violation of its obligation under the Charter and the cease-fire resolutions. It issued a solemn warning to Israel that, if there were a repeat incident, the Council would have to consider further steps to enforce its decisions and considered that Lebanon has suffered and responsibility rests with Israel.

== See also ==
- 1968 Israeli raid on Lebanon
- Arab–Israeli conflict
- List of United Nations Security Council Resolutions 201 to 300 (1965–1971)
