= King Abdulaziz Air Base =

Royal Saudi Air Force base in Dhahran, Saudi Arabia

King Abdulaziz Air Base
- قاعدة الملك عبدالعزيز الجوية
- Dhahran, Eastern Province in Saudi Arabia
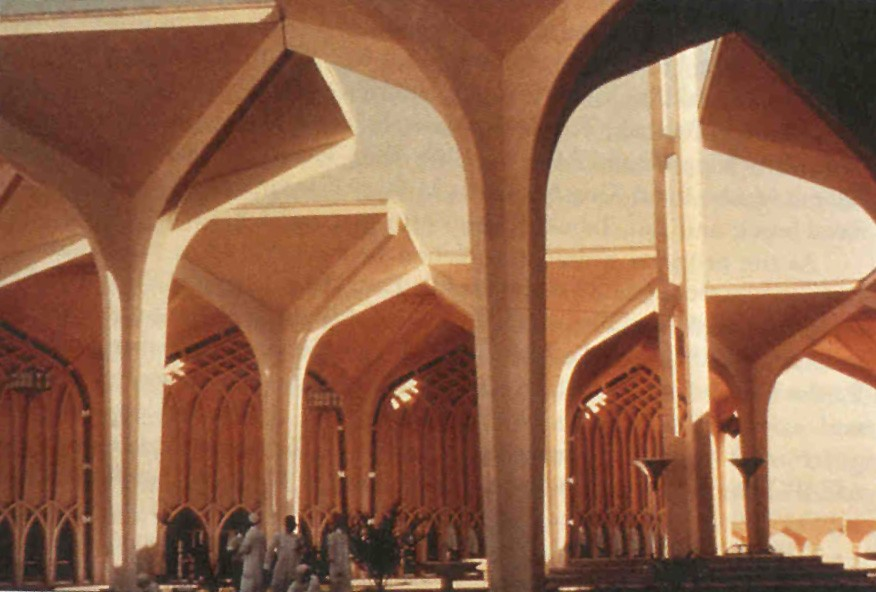

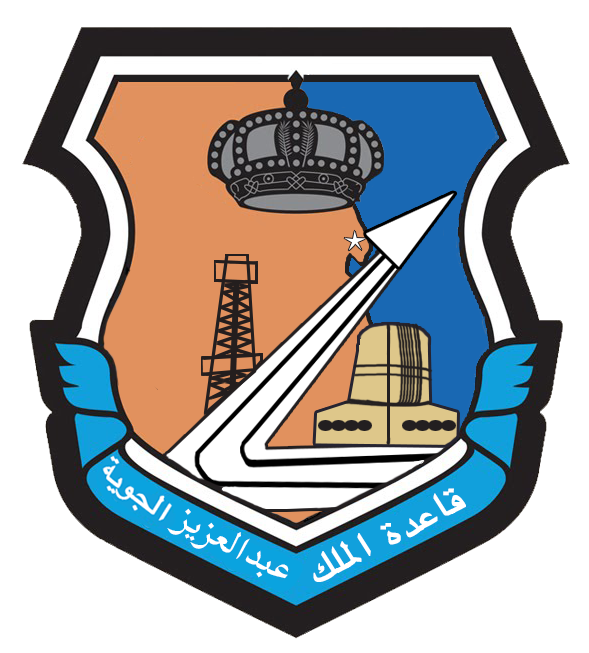
- Logo of King Abdulaziz Air Base

Site information
- Type: Air Force base
- Owner: Ministry of Defense
- Controlled by: Royal Saudi Air Force
- Open to the public: No
- Condition: Active

Location
- Location of King Abdulaziz Air Base OEDR (Persian Gulf)
- Coordinates: 26°15′45.2″N 50°09′11.0″E

Site history
- Built: 1961
- In use: 1961-1999; 1991-present

Garrison information
- Current commander: AVM Prince Turki bin Bandar bin Abdulaziz Al Saud
- Occupants: No. 13 Squadron; No. 92 Squadron; No. 44 Squadron; No. 7 Squadron; No. 35 Squadron; No. 75 Squadron; No. 83 Squadron

Airfield information
- Identifiers: IATA: DHA, ICAO: OEDR
- Elevation: 746 ft (227 m) AMSL
Runways
Direction	Length and surface
16R/34L	3,660 metres (12,008 ft) asphalt
16L/34R	3,600 metres (11,811 ft) asphalt
06/24	2,150 metres (7,054 ft) concrete

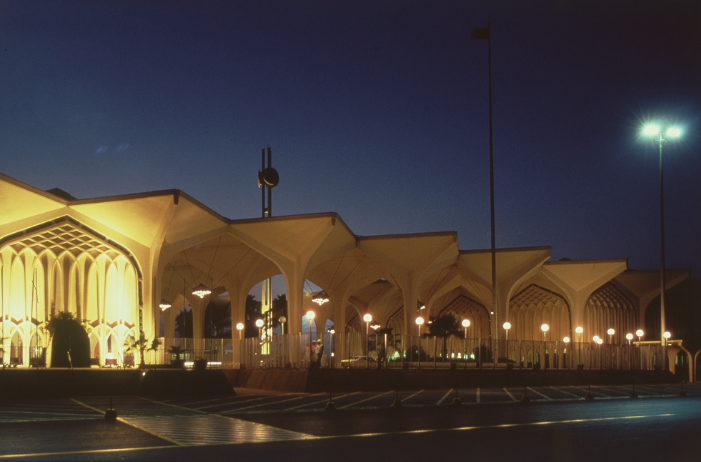

King Abdulaziz Air Base (Arabic: قاعدة الملك عبدالعزيز الجوية) (IATA: DHA, ICAO: OEDR), also known as Dhahran Air Base and formerly Dhahran International Airport, Dhahran Airport and Dhahran Airfield, is a Royal Saudi Air Force base located in Dhahran in the Eastern Province, Saudi Arabia. Located west of Thuqbah and 7 km (4 mi) southeast of the Saudi Aramco Dhahran Camp, the airbase was the first Saudi Arabian airport to be constructed, in 1961, and is under the command of Air vice-marshal Prince Turki bin Bandar bin Abdulaziz Al Saud.

The airbase was initially built and operated by the United States Air Force from 1945 until 1962 and was known as the Dhahran Airfield. After use by the USAF, it was converted for commercial use and was known as the Dhahran International Airport, and was shared with the King Abdulaziz Air Base of the Royal Saudi Air Force. The military relationship that exists today between the United States and Saudi Arabia was highly influenced by the origin and development of this airfield.

During its commercial use phase, from 1962 to 1999, it was one of Saudi Arabia's busiest passenger airports and was commemorated on the 2nd issue 5-riyal banknotes and the 3rd issue 1-riyal banknotes. After the completion and inauguration of the King Fahd International Airport further north, the airport lost its commercial status and once again reverted to military use only, albeit by the Royal Saudi Air Force, which still uses it today.

== History ==
During World War II, the Persian Gulf and Arabian Peninsula were important staging and shipping routes for the U.S. to provide both lend-lease assistance to the Soviet Union, as well as supply the allied forces fighting the Imperial Japanese forces in Asia.

Owing to Saudi Arabia's importance, primarily its location, in 1943 the US extended lend-lease status to Saudi Arabia, one of only three Arab countries to receive this aid. In 1944, the U.S. War Department (renamed in 1949 the United States Department of Defense) proposed building an airbase in or near Dhahran, Saudi Arabia.

In 1945, the U.S. and Saudi Arabia signed the Dhahran Air Field Agreement. This agreement permitted the U.S. to build a small air field near the Arabian American Oil Company (ARAMCO) town. The use of the term "air field", as opposed to "air base" was a direct result of U.S. sensitivity of Saudi Arabia's concerns regarding imperialism. Further, full ownership of the airfield was scheduled to revert to Saudi Arabia at the conclusion of the war, after an agreed-upon three-year period during which the U.S. would have the rights to operate the field.

Despite the end of World War II in the European theater, in 1945, President Harry S. Truman signed the Agreement, which owing to the lack of any military justification, and again a reflection of Saudi Arabia's concerns regarding imperialism and the symbolism of foreign bases on their soil, was promptly rejected by the King. The War Department, likewise, dropped their support of the project. However, the U.S. State Department, recognizing the economic benefits of this location, and the diplomatic benefits afforded by the agreement, continued to pursue development of the Dhahran Air Field. After Congress approved substantial economic development assistance, the U.S. State Department and the Saudi Government agreed, in August 1945, to develop the air field. The War Department was forced to foot the cost of the construction.

In 1948, when the originally agreed-upon three-year post-war period of U.S. operations came to a close, the agreement was renegotiated. While the airfield had not been completed until 1946, too late to be of any benefit for World War II logistics (its original justification) it did provide benefits in the late 1940s, specifically in the context of the increasing tension between the U.S. and the Soviet Union. In 1949 Dhahran airfield was the only airfield in the area which could support the United States Air Force (USAF)’s B-29s. Thus, the airfield took on increasing importance in the U.S.’s eyes as one location in the U.S. strategy of the containment of communism. For Saudi Arabia, the base provided an element of security from the U.S. forces posted there, among Saudi Arabia's growing concerns regarding their neighbors, particularly Yemen, and the Hashemites of Iraq and Transjordan. The 1948 agreement reverted ownership of the air base to Saudi Arabia, and on-going year-to-year leases, for which the U.S. would pay rent.

On 18 June 1951, the two governments signed an agreement renewing and extending USAF usage rights at the airfield.

In a further renewal agreement dated 2 April 1957, the U.S. pledged to provide construction support to help the Saudis improve their commercial air facilities at the Dhahran Civil Air Terminal and to assist, advise, and train the Saudi Army, Navy, and Air Force. To accomplish the tasks of assistance and training, the United States redesignated the Military Assistance and Advisory Group, in Saudi Arabia since 1949, as the United States Military Training Mission (USMTM). The USMTM staff, with headquarters at the Dhahran terminal, consisted of three sections representing the American armed services. Each section worked with the corresponding Saudi military service.

=== Civilian ===
In 1949, Middle East Airlines became one of the first airlines to fly to the airport. Through the 1950s, the Dhahran airfield began to emerge as a commercial transportation hub, as the nearby Dammam oil fields increased the overall economic viability of the area. Additionally, Trans World Airlines began using Dhahran as a hub for increasing transport to and from Asia and Europe. The Dhahran airfield and the emerging support facilities became Dhahran International Airport in 1961, shortly before the United States relinquished control in 1962.

Minoru Yamasaki designed the Dhahran International Airport terminal in 1959, and when the engineering institution presented the design to King Saud, he admired it very much, as mentioned in the book of the history of the Corps of Engineers Bricks, Sand, and Marble (bricks, sand and marble). The project contract was awarded, at a cost of 22.5 million Saudi riyals, to the Oman Farnsworth Wright Foundation in May 1959, which entrusted the construction work to the Saudi Projects Company, which began construction work in August 1959 and ended in September 1961, and parts of precast concrete were used in the construction process.

In the 1960s, the airport had two runways: Runway 16/34 (now Runway 16L/34R), which was the main runway with a length of 10,006 feet and width of 148 feet, and Runway 06/24, which was used in sandstorms with a length of 6,020 feet and a width of 150 feet. 16/34 had crushed concrete ends. Both runways still exist, Runway 16L/34R now being 11,811 feet long, though they are not used that much anymore.

By 1978, the airport was served by 24 airlines. On 21 November 1979, due to increasing passenger demand, a new international terminal was built. It was designed and equipped to handle more than 2 million passengers a year. It was the first phase in a comprehensive scheme to expand and upgrade airport facilities.

"Our passenger traffic is growing at a rate of 35 percent a year," said Airport director Sami Maqbul. In 1979 alone, 1 and three-quarter million international passengers and one and a half million domestic passengers were expected to use the airport. Air cargo was to reach 39 million kilograms. The number of flights was going to approximate 75,000. To accommodate the growth in traffic, work began two years prior not only to expand terminal facilities, but also to upgrade flight-control equipment and landing facilities.

Work had also begun on lengthening, strengthening, and widening the airport's two main runways to accommodate the larger jumbo jets.

In February 1979, Pan Am commenced a route to New York City using Boeing 747SPs. The passengers included Americans who worked for Aramco and Saudis studying at universities in the United States. The service ceased in February 1986; Pan Am had sold its 747SPs and did not possess another aircraft that could operate the flights nonstop.

Dhahran served a significant role in the 1994 evacuation of U.S. citizens and personnel from Yemen when that country slid into civil war. During Operation Desert Focus in 1996, after the bombing of the Khobar Towers, the airport was used to relocate over 6,000 U.S. citizens and personnel within the Kingdom of Saudi Arabia. The Dhahran airfield continued to serve as the Eastern Province's commercial air hub until the completion, in 1999, of the King Fahd International Airport near Dammam, when all scheduled flights were shifted out of Dhahran International Airport. The terminal built in 1961 was kept when the airport became an airbase, and can still be seen on Google Earth as of 2025.

=== Military ===
King Abdul-Aziz Air Base has been a major RSAF airbase since the USAF left in 1962, providing air defence, tactical and strategic support for the Eastern Province and nearby regions, as well as providing aviation related technical training to RSAF personnel.

Between 1963 and 1999 the base was called Dhahran Air Base.

Between 17 September 1963 and 20 November 1963 the United States Air Force's 524th Tactical Fighter Squadron was deployed here with North American F-100 Super Sabres.

==== The Gulf War ====
A detachment of Royal Air Force Panavia Tornado GR.1's from No. 31 Squadron RAF were based here during January 1991.

==== 1990s ====
During October 1994 the USAF 75th Fighter Squadron (Republic A-10 Thunderbolt II aircraft) was moved to Dhahran Air Base, prior to forward deployment to Ahmad al-Jaber Air Base, Kuwait.

In 1999, Dhahran Air Base was renamed King Abdulaziz Air Base.

==== 2026 ====
Pakistan has deployed a significant military contingent to Saudi Arabia as of April 2026. This deployment includes approximately 13,000 ground troops and a fleet of 10 to 18 fighter jets from the Pakistan Air Force (PAF).

== Terminals and structure ==
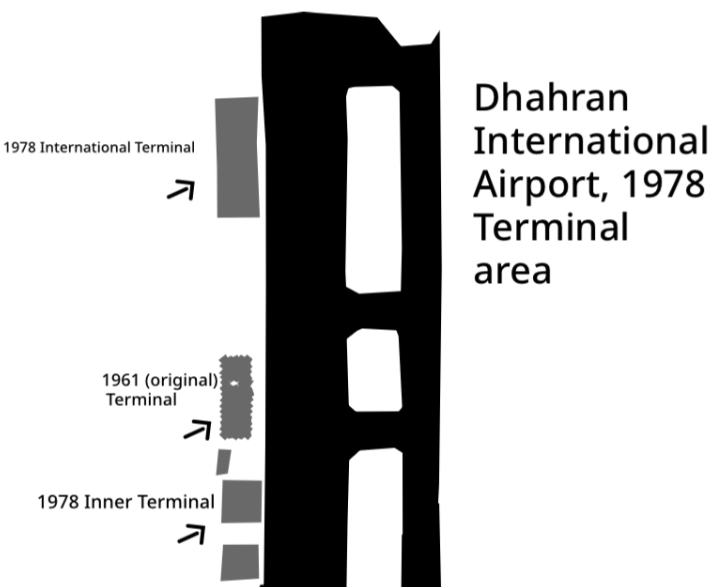
The terminal, or north-east area of the then Dhahran International Airport

The original airport terminal building is one of the architectural works of Minoru Yamasaki and was completed in 1961 with an area of only 70,000 square feet. The architecture is a blending of traditional Islamic forms with modern technology. For example, the flight control tower has the appearance of a minaret. Images of the terminal have been used on Saudi banknotes and is viewed as having influenced the design of a number of important buildings throughout the Middle East. The terminal was split into two sections, domestic and international. The international hall was much larger than the domestic hall. In between the two halls was road that was used for dropping off into the terminal and a tall tower, with a circle on it showing the winged Saudi emblem. The airport constructed two new terminals in 1978. Dhahran Airport was capable of handling 9 Boeing 747s, 6 Tristars, and 6 smaller aircraft by 1999. The International Terminal Building had an area of 16900m2 (242m x 64m). The Internal Terminal Building had an area of 4800m2 (80m x 60m). The Royal Hall had an area of 752.74m2. One of the VIP lounges had an area of 202.01 m2, the other having 165.91 m2. The airport tower was 100.5 m above sea level and was used in 1978, while the older tower was about 30 m high and was used in 1963. The observation tower was located east of the airport with an area of 64,000 m2 and more than 40% of this area had been built as shipping warehouses. The airport had parking for more than 2,000 cars.

The 1978 or 1979 international terminal had a combined post office, telegraph, and telephone area, a well-equipped lounge, check in counters, and a car rental agency.

== Historical statistics ==
Dhahran International Airport was the third busiest airport in Saudi Arabia.

Year	Passengers	Cargo (tonnes)	Aircraft movements	Transport movements
1976	1,393,712	19,966	73,854	21,510
1977	1,862,000	27,753	87,960	30,028

== Current use ==
Dhahran International Airport has been transformed into a military airbase. It has been renamed King Abdulaziz Air Base and serves the purposes of the Royal Saudi Air Force and Pakistan Air Force. There are also a couple of VIP airlines that operate out of DHA: Aviation-Link operates one A319 and B777-200, and NEXUS Flight Operations operates one A319.

- RSAF 3 Wing:
  - No. 13 Squadron RSAF with the McDonnell Douglas F-15C Eagle and the F-15D
  - No. 44 Squadron RSAF with the Bell 412EP & AB412EP
- RSAF 11 Wing:
  - No. 35 Squadron RSAF with the British Aerospace Jetstream 31
  - No. 75 Squadron RSAF with the Panavia Tornado IDS
  - No. 83 Squadron RSAF with the Tornado IDS
  - Fighter Weapons School with the Tornado IDS and the McDonnell Douglas F-15SA Strike Eagle

The base hosts the annual Exercise Spears of Victory which trains personnel in air-ground, air superiority and strike missions.

As of April 2026, the Pakistan Air Force has deployed a contingent of fighter jets and support aircraft at the airbase.

== Gallery ==
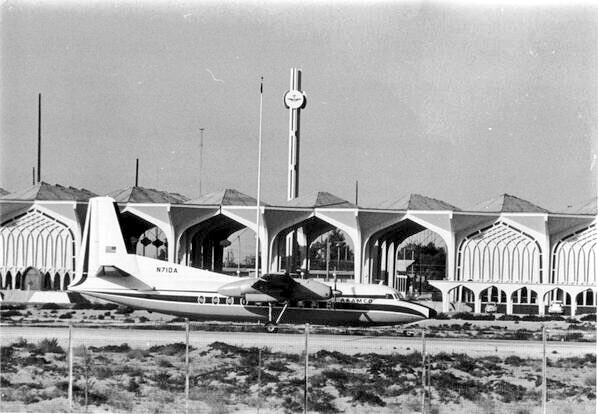
An Aramco aircraft in front of the terminal

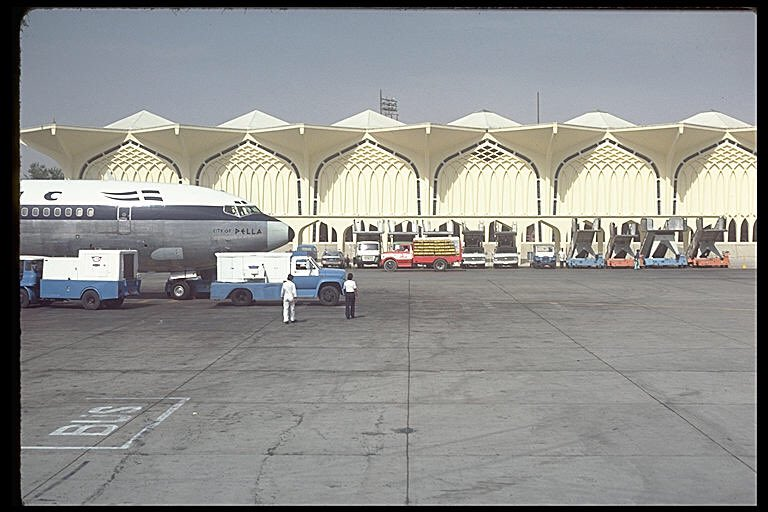
An aircraft parked in front of the terminal

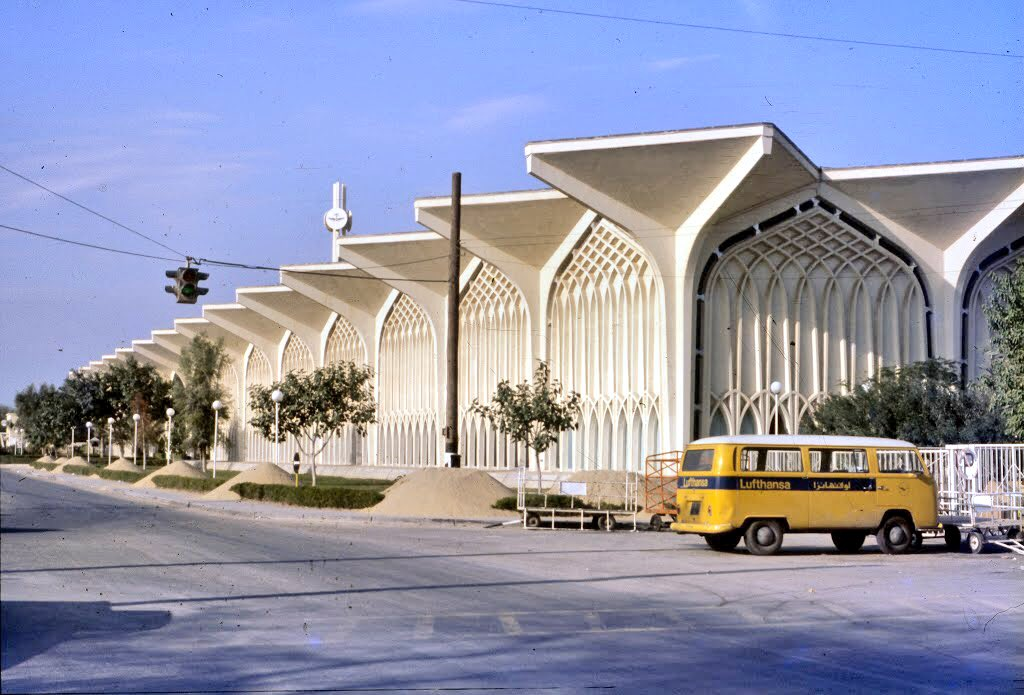
A view of the terminal from the airport road

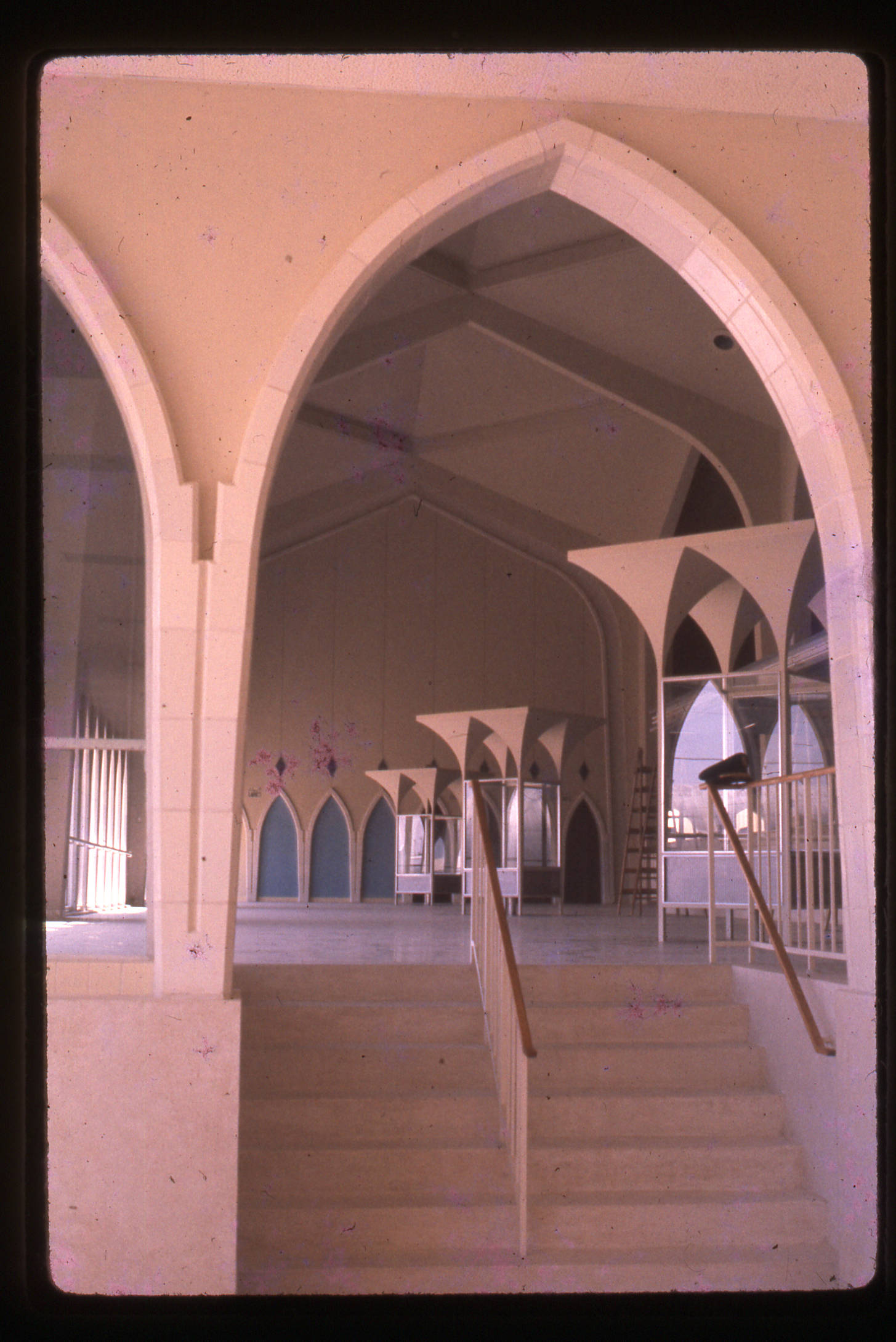
Interior of the terminal

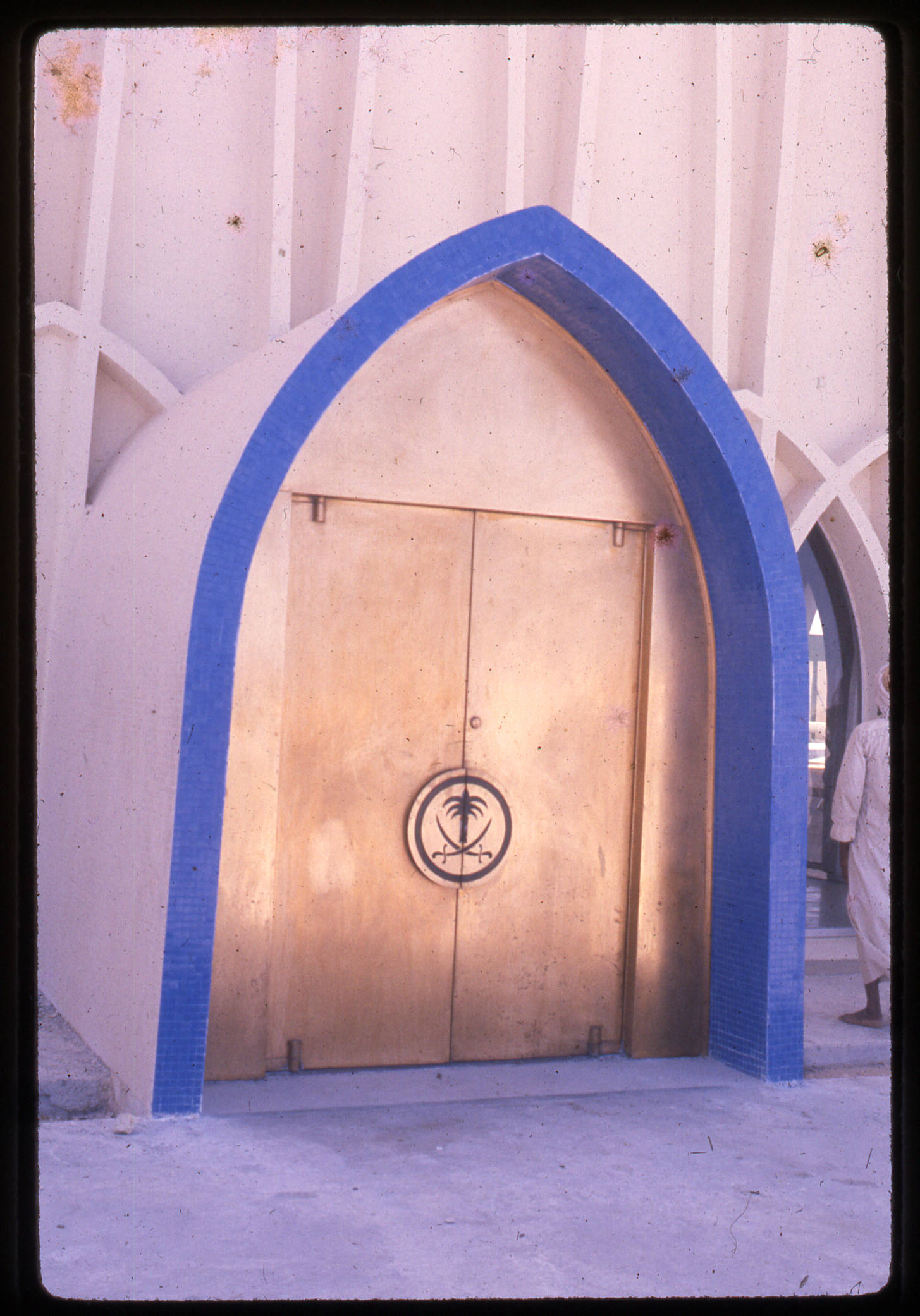
Door of the terminal

== Accidents and incidents ==
- On 19 October 1950, a Douglas DC-3 crashed on takeoff from the airbase, killing one person on board and damaging the aircraft beyond repair.
- On 30 December 1956, a United States Air Force Military Air Transport Service Lockheed C-121 Constellation en route from Tripoli crashed on approach to the airfield, killing 12 of 38 on board. The cause was determined to be a combination of the inoperativity of Ground Controlled Approach (GCA) and poor visibility due to fog. The aircraft was damaged beyond repair.
- On 17 April 1964 Middle East Airlines Flight 444, a Sud Aviation SE-210 Caravelle III carrying 42 passengers and seven crew, crashed 7 km offshore in the Half Moon Bay, approaching Dhahran International Airport from the south. The cause of the crash remains undetermined. All people on board lost their lives in the crash.
- On 8 July 1968, a Saudia Convair CV-340 carrying 11 people en route from Bahrain International Airport crashed 5 km (3 mi) south of the airport while attempting approach for the third time due to poor visibility caused by a sandstorm.
- On 17 March 1985, a Saudia Boeing 737-200 carrying 76 passengers and 21 crew from Jeddah to Riyadh was hijacked by a lone man armed with a grenade. After commandeering the aircraft up to Riyadh, the hijacker demanded to be flown to another destination, after which he was told that the aircraft would need to refuel in Dhahran. After letting everyone on the plane except the pilots disembark, the man was asked to surrender to security forces, which he refused to do. Subsequently, the aircraft was stormed; the man threw the grenade, and was shot and killed.

== See also ==
- List of airports in Saudi Arabia
- List of things named after Saudi kings
- Saudi Aramco Residential Camp in Dhahran
- Military Air Transport Service
- List of military installations in Saudi Arabia
