= No. 35 Squadron RSAF =

- Active: Unknown-present
- Country: Saudi Arabia
- Branch: Royal Saudi Air Force
- Type: Squadron
- Part of: RSAF 11 Wing
- Base: King Abdulaziz Air Base, Dhahran
- Aircraft: British Aerospace Jetstream 31

No. 35 Squadron RSAF is a squadron of the Royal Saudi Air Force that operates the British Aerospace Jetstream 31 at King Abdulaziz Air Base, Dhahran, Eastern Province, in Saudi Arabia within RSAF 11 Wing.
