= Y7 =

Y7 may refer to:

- Xian Y-7, a Chinese-built version of the Antonov An-24 aircraft
- LNER Class Y7, a British class of steam locomotives designed for shunting
- A television rating unsuitable for children aged under seven, in the U.S. TV Parental Guidelines (TV-Y7)
- Silverjet, IATA code Y7

== See also ==
- 7Y (disambiguation)
