= Middle East Airlines Flight 444 =

1964 aviation accident

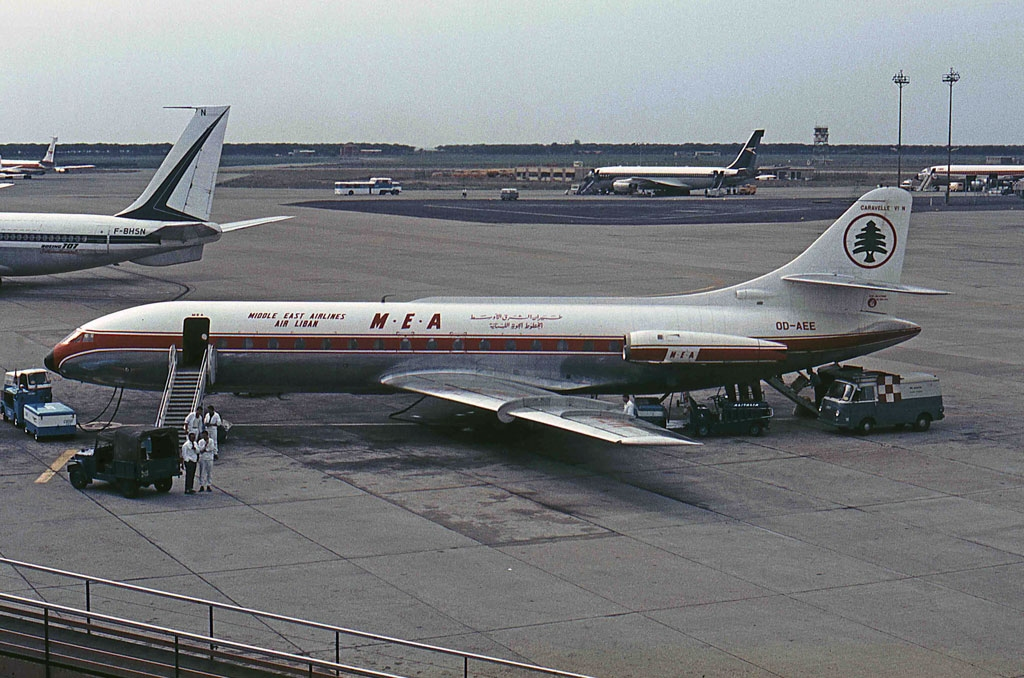
- A Middle East Airlines Sud Aviation Caravelle VIN, the accident aircraft was a III variant

Accident
- Date: 17 April 1964
- Summary: Crashed during approach
- Site: Persian Gulf, Saudi Arabia; 26.099°N 50.227°E

Aircraft
- Aircraft type: Sud Aviation Caravelle III
- Operator: Middle East Airlines
- Registration: OD-AEM
- Flight origin: Beirut International Airport, Lebanon
- Destination: Dhahran International Airport, Saudi Arabia
- Occupants: 49
- Passengers: 42
- Crew: 7
- Fatalities: 49
- Survivors: 0

Middle East Airlines Flight 444 was a scheduled passenger flight between Beirut International Airport and Dhahran International Airport. On 17 April 1964, the flight, operated by a Sud Aviation Caravelle III crashed into the Persian Gulf about 19 km (12 mi) south–southeast of Dhahran International Airport. All 42 passengers and 7 crew members died in the crash. The cause of the crash was never determined.

== Aircraft and crew ==
The accident aircraft was a Lebanese-registered Sud Aviation Caravelle III, the only fleet in the airline, and bore the registration OD–AEM. It was certified airworthy until 29 January 1965, and a maintenance certificate was issued on 5 April. On the date of the crash, the aircraft had flown from Beirut to Ankara and back to its origin city after which some technical problems were fixed. The flight captain was a 33-year-old who had logged 9,193 hours in the air, of which, 235 hours on the Sud Aviation Caravelle. He had 10 hours and 35 minutes on OD–AEM. The co-pilot, aged 36, had flown for 7,691 hours and spent 70 hours on the Sud Aviation Caravelle; 29 hours was on the ill-fated aircraft.

== Flight ==
Flight 444 departed Beirut International Airport at 1709 UTC and proceeded with its flight plan to a cruising altitude of 30,000 ft (9,100 m). Two hours later, Bahrain air control approved its decent to 5,000 ft (1,500 m) over the Dhahran navigation beacon. At 19:06, Flight 444 requested the latest wind and visibility updates from Dhahran Tower. The tower reported north–northeasternly winds of 10 kn (19 km/h; 12 mph), gusting to 16 kn (30 km/h; 18 mph), with visibility of 7.4 km (4.6 mi), although due to a sandstom, was limited to 100.6 m (330 ft). At 19:09, the crew informed air control it was descending from 30,000 ft (9,100 m), and by 19:26, estimated they would reach the navigation beacon in two minutes.

At 19:28, Flight 444 reported that it was descending to 5,000 ft (1,500 m). It was cleared for an ADF approach and ordered to report again at 4,000 ft (1,200 m) and 2,000 ft (610 m). A minute later, the flight confirmed it had passed 4,000 ft (1,200 m). At 19:30, the flight reported its altitude at 2,500 ft (760 m) and turned towards the runway. The crew was cleared to land and directed to report once they reached the minimum altitude and saw the runway. A brief loud noise was heard over the radio by the control tower at 19:32 and communication with the flight ceased. It was later discovered that the aircraft crashed into the gulf while making a turn at 19:32. The crash site was located 7.4 km (4.6 mi) offshore and 18.5 km (11.5 mi) south of the airport. It impacted the water at a slight nose-down angle, banked to the right, and at speeds consistent with those during landing.

== Recovery ==
American, British and Saudi Arabian aircraft participated in aerial search and rescue while workers at the Arabian American Oil Co. helped survey the ground. The company also supplied two planes and 51 trucks to assist. There were 23 Americans on board who may have been employees. Additionally, there were French, Jordanian, Palestinian, Syrian, Lebanese, Saudi and Bahrainian nationals on board. The following morning, a United States Air Force and two airliners spotted the submerged wreckage, with the aircraft partially intact. Despite the fuselage intact, none of the occupants survived the crash. About 95 percent of the aircraft was recovered within a 76.2 m (250 ft) radius of the main wreckage. The water depth at the crash site was about 5.5 m (18 ft). The forward and rear fuselage separated from the main body, but was held by electrical wiring and control cables. Most of the victims were stuck to their seats when they were found.

== Investigation ==
An investigation conducted by the General Authority of Civil Aviation could not determine the cause of the crash. Both pilots were deemed capable of flying and the aircraft had no technical issues. Despite the poor weather condition, it did not meet the threshold that prevented the pilot from aborting the approach. However, a localised high velocity vertical gust or windshear occurred in the area which could potentially have caused the aircraft to descend more rapidly than usual. The pilots had either completed or were about to complete the non-directional beacon approach when the aircraft crashed.
