= No. 13 Squadron RSAF =

- Active: Unknown-present
- Country: Saudi Arabia
- Branch: Royal Saudi Air Force
- Type: Squadron
- Part of: RSAF 3 Wing
- Base: King Abdulaziz Air Base, Dhahran
- Aircraft: McDonnell Douglas F-15C Eagle; McDonnell Douglas F-15D Eagle

No. 13 Squadron RSAF is a squadron of the Royal Saudi Air Force that operates the McDonnell Douglas F-15C Eagle and the F-15D at King Abdulaziz Air Base, Dhahran, Eastern Province in Saudi Arabia within RSAF 3 Wing.

The squadron attended Exercise Spears of Victory 23 during February 2023 at King Abdulaziz Air Base.
