= 1963 Ankara mid-air collision =

Aviation disaster

Middle East Airlines Flight 265 Turkish Air Force C-47
Accident
- Date: 1 February 1963
- Summary: Mid-air collision following pilot error
- Site: Ankara, Turkey
- Total fatalities: 104
- Total survivors: 0 (on airplanes)

First aircraft
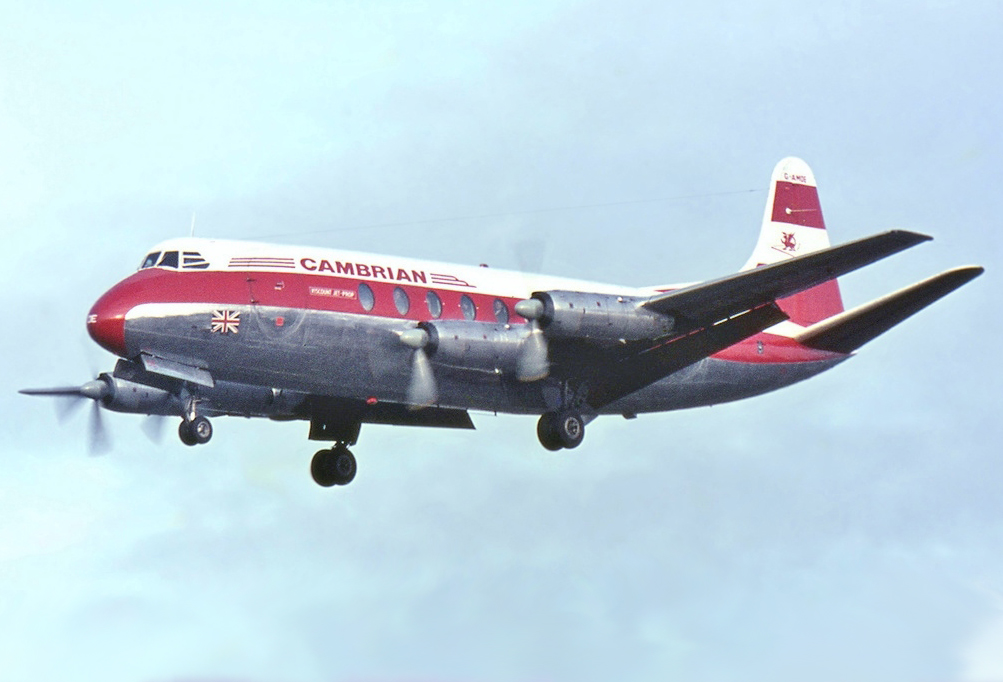
- A Vickers Viscount similar to the aircraft involved the collision
- Type: Vickers 754D Viscount
- Operator: Middle East Airlines
- IATA flight No.: ME265
- ICAO flight No.: MEA265
- Call sign: CEDAR JET 265
- Registration: OD-ADE
- Flight origin: Beirut–Rafic Hariri International Airport
- Stopover: Nicosia International Airport
- Destination: Esenboğa International Airport
- Passengers: 11
- Crew: 3
- Fatalities: 14
- Survivors: 0

Second aircraft
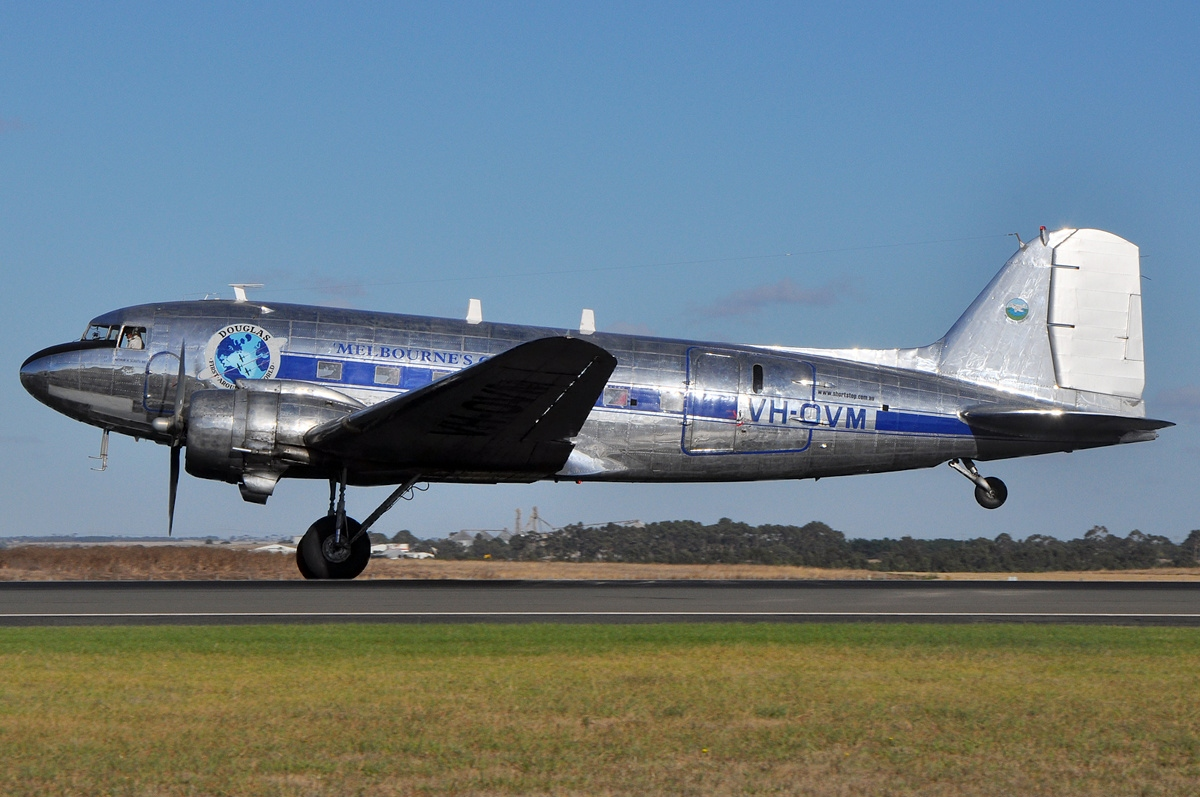
- A Douglas C-47 Skytrain, the type involved in the accident
- Type: Douglas C-47 Skytrain
- Operator: Turkish Air Force
- Registration: CBK28
- Flight origin: Etimesgut Air Base
- Destination: Etimesgut Air Base
- Crew: 3
- Fatalities: 3
- Survivors: 0

Ground casualties
- Ground fatalities: 87

A mid-air collision occurred on Friday, 1 February 1963, over Ankara, Turkey, when Middle East Airlines Flight 265, a Vickers 754D Viscount completing a flight from Cyprus, came in for landing and collided in the air with a Turkish Air Force Douglas C-47A. After the collision both planes fell directly onto the city below them. All 17 people on board both aircraft died, along with 87 people on the ground.

== Aircraft involved ==
=== Vickers Viscount ===
Middle East Airlines Flight 265 was a passenger flight en route to Ankara from Cyprus, carrying eleven passengers and three crew. The aircraft involved was a Vickers 754D Viscount, registered OD-ADE and owned by Middle East Airlines. The aircraft involved was initially registered G-APCE, ordered by the British Overseas Airways Corporation. It was initially planned to be transferred to one of the subsidiary airlines of BOAC, Lebanese Middle East Airlines (MEA), but in April 1957 it was decided to be sent to another, Cyprus Airways, where it was to serve the London–Cyprus route. The final assembly of the airliner did not start until 11 June, and in September it was finally finished, painted in the livery of Cyprus Airways and given the name "Buffavento". However, by that time the flight from Cyprus to London was already served by British European Airways, so Cyprus Airways found it unnecessary; hence, on 31 October 1957, the plane was re-registered, giving it the new registration OD-ADE and on 24 November, it finally made his first flight. On 12 December, OD-ADE was transferred to the initial customer, MEA. At the time of the accident, the aircraft had 13,187 flight hours and 5,515 pressurization cycles. The crew on board the fatal flight consisted of two pilots and one flight attendant:

- The captain, 29, had a pilot's license that was valid until 30 May 1963. In August 1962, he was certified to serve as a captain on the Vickers Viscount; having a total of 2,925 flight hours on the Viscount.
- The first officer, 38, had a pilot's license that was valid until 17 May 1963. In June 1960, he was certified to serve as a captain on the Vickers Viscount; having a total of 4,200 flight hours on the Viscount.

=== Turkish Air Force C-47 ===
The other aircraft involved in the accident was a Douglas C-47A Skytrain registered as CBK-28, belonging to the Turkish Air Force. The aircraft was built in 1944 and at the time of the accident it had 2,340 flight hours. The crew consisted of two pilots, an instructor and a trainee, as well as a radio operator. The pilot in command and instructor was 33 years old, had been a pilot since May 1955 and had a total of 1,452 hours flying time on the C-47. The pilot in training was 22 years old and had a pilot's license since July 1962; he had 36 hours flying time on the C-47. On the day of the accident, CBK-28 was carrying out a training flight, which departed from Etimesgut Air Base. The trainee was sitting in the left seat and wearing blue glasses. An orange plexiglass panel was placed in front of him on the left side of the windshield to prevent seeing outside as part of instrument training. The supervising instructor was on the right.

== Accident ==
According to meteorological data, at 15:00 in the sky over Ankara clouds were present with a lower boundary of 3,000 feet (910 m), visibility was 10-20 kilometers. The flights collided over Ankara at 7,000 feet in good weather.

The C-47 departed Etimesgut at 11:22 GMT; the instrument training flight flew a route southeast of the Gölbaşı radio beacon for an hour and a half, after which the pilots headed back to Etimesgut, following visual flight rules. The flight was intended to last 1 hour and 30 minutes.

Flight 265 radioed Esenboğa at 13:04 GMT to inform air traffic control it would descend from flight level 185 to 105 and would pass Gölbaşı at 13:07. Flight 265 was given permission to descend to 6500 feet at 13:05. Air traffic control ordered Flight 265 to report when they began descent for landing on runway 03. The altimeter setting was 1015.5 mb. Flight 265 reported descending to 6,500 ft and would radio when reaching the Ankara beacon; it was descending from flight level 125 intended to radio when reaching flight level 105. At 13:07 GMT the aircraft reported altitude at flight level 100, and asked it they needed to enter a holding pattern; they had not checked in with Ankara air traffic control but would soon. The flight was 8,000 ft over the Ankara beacon at 13:09 and continued descent to flight level 65. Air traffic control expected to hear from the plane again but never did; the controller made multiple attempts to contact the plane starting at 13:13 but never heard from the plane again.

The Viscount, flying at a heading of 283°, collided into the C-47 flying on a heading of 243°, both at 7,000 feet. It was noted that the Viscount attempted to avoid crashing by pulling up but failed. After the collision, both aircraft fell onto a residential neighborhood, killing 87 people there.

== Causes ==
Investigation showed the aircraft collided at a 40° angle. Eyewitnesses to the collision reported that there were clouds where the planes collided. The Turkish Department of Civil Aviation of the Ministry of Communications laid blame on the Viscount pilot for: incorrectly estimating the distance between Gölbaşı and Ankara; failing to comply with international standards for radio communications; and failing to follow the flight plan by flying under VFR instead of planned IFR conditions.

== Bibliography ==
- Middle East Airlines Co., Viscount 754, OD-ADE, and Turkish Air Force, C-47, CBK 28, were involved in a mid-air collision over Ankara, Turkey, on 1 February 1963 (excerpts from the Department of Civil Aviation of the Ministry of Communications, Turkey, of 30 April 1963). ICAO Digest No. 15. Volume I (PDF) (ICAO Circular 78-AN / 66), Montreal: International Civil Aviation Organization, 1966, pp. 43–50, archived from the original (PDF) on 27 March 2017. Alternate link at baaa-acro.com.
