= Middle East Airlines =

Airline of Lebanon

Middle East Airlines – Air Liban S.A.L. طيران الشرق الأوسط – الخطوط الجوية اللبنانية

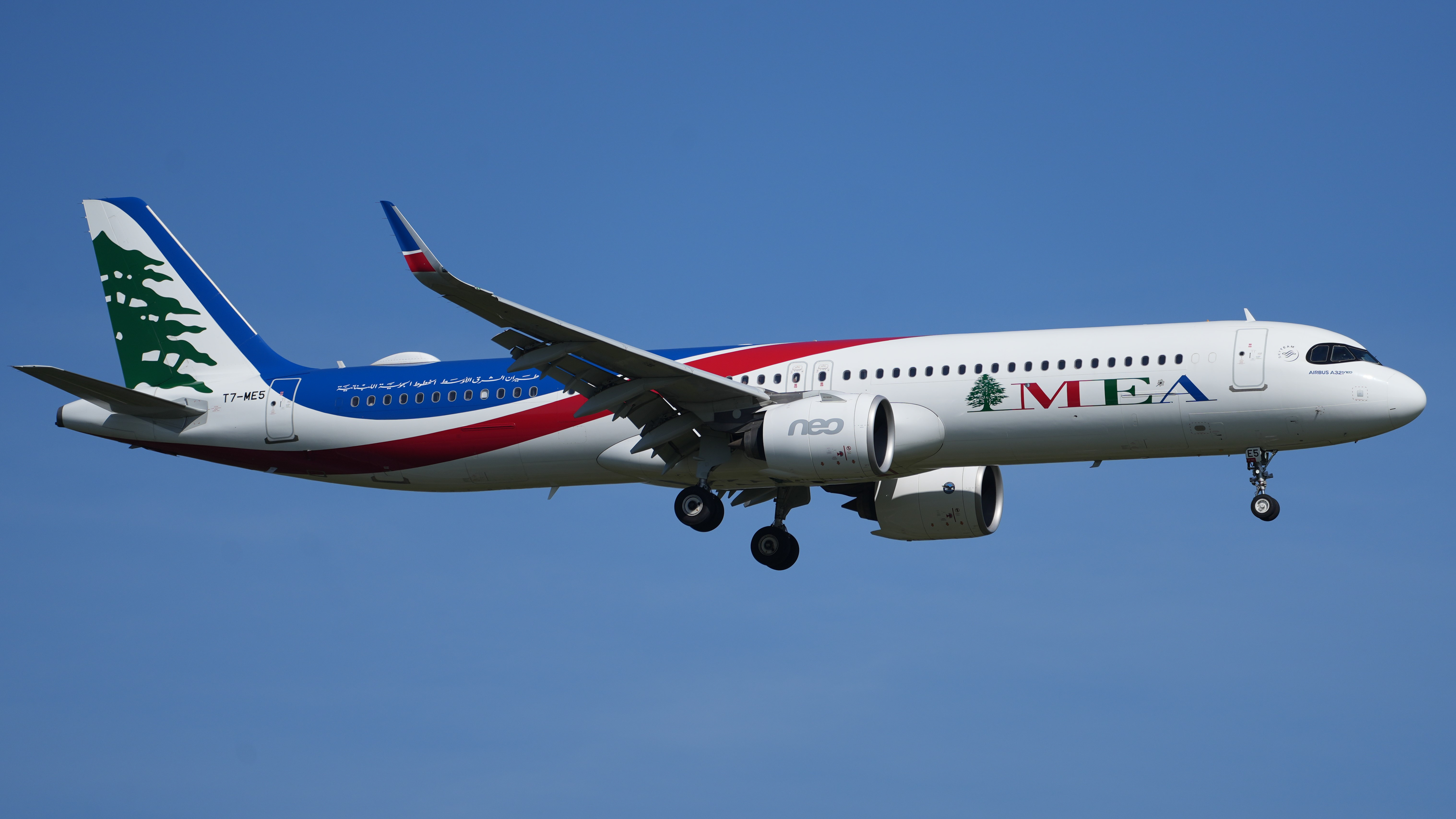
- Airbus A321neo approaching Frankfurt Airport
IATA	ICAO	Call sign
ME	MEA	CEDAR JET
- Founded: 31 May 1945; 81 years ago
- Commenced operations: 1 January 1946; 80 years ago
- AOC #: MEA-A001
- Hubs: Beirut–Rafic Hariri International Airport
- Frequent-flyer program: Cedar Miles
- Alliance: SkyTeam
- Subsidiaries: Cedar Executive; Lebanese Beirut Airport Catering Company (LBACC) (77.5%); Middle East Airlines Ground Handling (MEAG); Middle East Airports Services (MEAS); Mideast Aircraft Services Company (MASCO)
- Fleet size: 24 (22 commercial airliners + 2 private jets)
- Destinations: 33
- Parent company: Banque du Liban
- Headquarters: Beirut, Lebanon
- Key people: Mohammad El Hout (chairman & director general)
- Profit: ▲US$ 88,800,000 (2023)
- Employees: 5000+ (MEA, MEAG, MEAS, LBACC, MASCO) (2023)
- Website: www.mea.com.lb

Middle East Airlines – Air Liban S.A.L., (Note: Arabic: طيران الشرق الأوسط – الخطوط الجوية اللبنانية, romanized: Ṭayyarān aš-Šarq al-Awsaṭ – al-Xuṭūṭ al-jawiyyah al-Lubnāniyyah) more commonly known as Middle East Airlines (MEA), (Note: Arabic: طيران الشرق الأوسط, romanized: Ṭayyarān aš-Šarq al-Awsaṭ) is the flag carrier of Lebanon, with its head office in Beirut, near Beirut–Rafic Hariri International Airport. It operates scheduled international flights to Asia, Europe, the Middle East, and Africa from its base at Rafic Hariri International Airport.

Middle East Airlines (MEA) is a member of the SkyTeam airline alliance. MEA expressed its interest in becoming a SkyTeam associate member in early 2006 at a press conference in New York. On 28 February 2011, the airline signed the partnership agreement with SkyTeam at a ceremony in Beirut, and officially joined the alliance on 28 June 2012, becoming its 17th member and the second member airline in the Middle East.

== History ==
Middle East Airlines - Air Liban was founded on 31 May 1945 by Saeb Salam and Fawzi El-Hoss with operational and technical support from BOAC. Operations started on 1 January 1946 using three de Havilland DH.89A Dragon Rapides on flights between Beirut and Nicosia, followed by flights to Iraq, Egypt, and Syria. Two Douglas DC-3s were acquired in mid 1946. Pan American World Airways acquired a stake and management contract in September 1949. Pan Am was replaced when BOAC acquired 49% of MEA's shares in 1955, by which time their fleet was listed as five Douglas DC-3s, plus two SNCASE SE.161 Languedocs. A Vickers Viscount was introduced in October 1955 while an Avro York cargo aircraft was leased in June 1957. On 15 December 1960 the first of four de Havilland Comet 4Cs arrived. After the association with BOAC ended on 16 August 1961, MEA was merged with Air Liban on 7 June 1963, which gave Air France a 30% holding (since relinquished). The full title was then Middle East Airlines – Air Liban. In 1963, MEA also took over Lebanese International Airways.

The current name was adopted in November 1965 when the airline was merged with Air Liban. Although operations were interrupted by the 1967 Arab–Israeli war, and by the Israeli raid on Beirut Airport in 1968, in which the airline lost three Comet 4C's, two Caravelles, a Boeing 707, the Vickers VC10, and the Vickers Viscount, MEA restarted by acquiring a Convair 990A from American Airlines, which entered service on 24 June 1969.

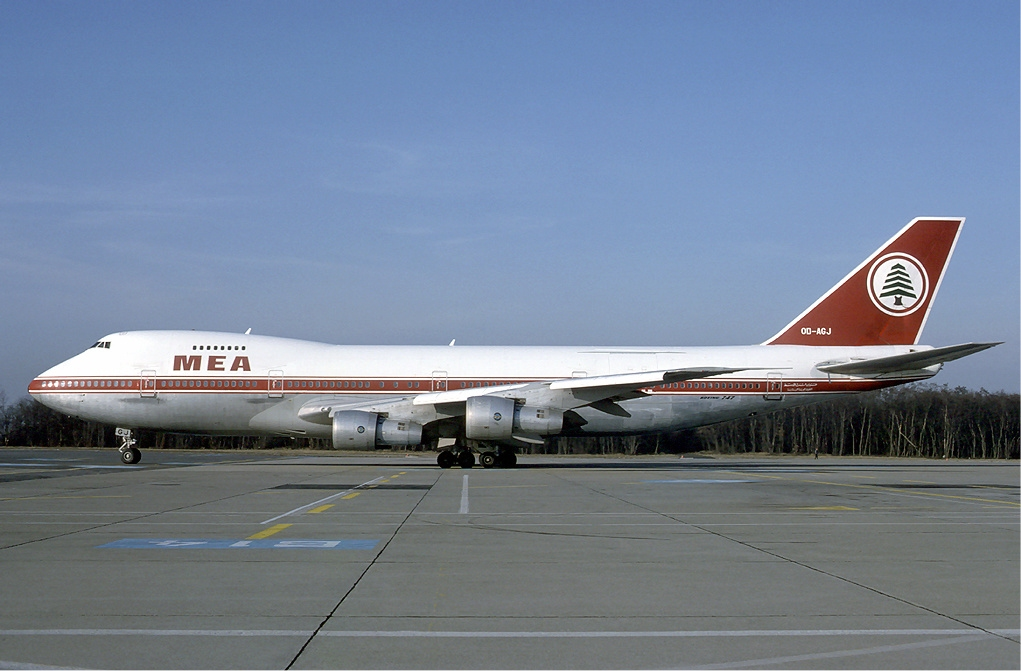
A Boeing 747-200 in 1984

A Boeing 747-200B entered service in June 1975 on the Beirut–London route, and later on the Beirut–Paris–New York route from April 1983 until mid 1985. MEA had to adjust its operations due to the Lebanese Civil War between 1975 and 1991 but continued services despite multiple closures of the base at Beirut International Airport. Airbus A310-300s were acquired in 1993 and 1994, followed by an A321-200 in 1997 and the A330-200 (which replaced the A310s) in 2003. The airline has introduced self-check-in kiosks at Beirut International Airport as of 2010.

In November 2011, MEA's pilots union staged a 48-hour strike after a captain undergoing cancer treatment was dismissed shortly after going on sick leave.

On 28 June 2012, Middle East Airlines joined the SkyTeam alliance to become its 17th member and the second in the Middle East following Saudia. 5,000 staff are employed across the airline group. The central bank of Lebanon, Banque du Liban, owns a majority share of 99.50%.

On 11 November 2025, during its 80th anniversary conference, MEA's chairman, Mohamad El Hout, revealed the airline's plans to launch a new low-cost subsidiary, "Fly Beirut", to be managed by MEA itself. According to El Hout, the airline will commence operation in 2027 with a fleet of 6 aeroplanes and will be based out of Rene Mouawad Airport in North Lebanon.

In June 2026, Lebanon's aviation regulator opened a safety audit of the airline after pilot groups alleged crews has been asked to fly close to airstrikes and that pilots had been penalised for reporting safety incidents.

== Destinations ==
Middle East Airlines flies to 32 destinations, spanning across the Middle East, Europe, and Africa.

List of Middle East Airlines destinations
Country	City	Airport	Notes
Armenia	Yerevan	Zvartnots International Airport	
Australia	Sydney	Sydney Airport	Terminated
Belgium	Brussels	Brussels Airport	
Canada	Montreal	Montréal–Pierre Elliott Trudeau International Airport	Terminated
Canada	Toronto	Toronto Pearson International Airport	Terminated
Canada	Vancouver	Vancouver International Airport	Terminated
Cyprus	Larnaca	Larnaca International Airport	
Denmark	Copenhagen	Copenhagen Airport	Seasonal
Egypt	Cairo	Cairo International Airport	
France	Nice	Nice Côte d'Azur Airport	Seasonal
France	Paris	Charles de Gaulle Airport	
Germany	Berlin	Berlin Brandenburg Airport	
Germany	Düsseldorf	Düsseldorf Airport	
Germany	Frankfurt	Frankfurt Airport	
Ghana	Accra	Accra International Airport	
Greece	Athens	Athens International Airport	
Greece	Mykonos	Mykonos Airport	Seasonal
India	Delhi	Indira Gandhi International Airport	Terminated
India	Mumbai	Chhatrapati Shivaji Maharaj International Airport	Terminated
Iraq	Baghdad	Baghdad International Airport	
Iraq	Basra	Basra International Airport	Terminated
Iraq	Najaf	Al Najaf International Airport	
Iraq	Erbil	Erbil International Airport	
Ireland	Dublin	Dublin Airport	Terminated
Italy	Milan	Milan Malpensa Airport	
Italy	Rome	Rome Fiumicino Airport	
Ivory Coast	Abidjan	Félix-Houphouët-Boigny International Airport	
Jordan	Amman	Queen Alia International Airport	
Kuwait	Kuwait City	Kuwait International Airport	
Lebanon	Beirut	Beirut–Rafic Hariri International Airport	Hub
Netherlands	Amsterdam	Amsterdam Airport Schiphol	
Nigeria	Lagos	Murtala Muhammed International Airport	
Qatar	Doha	Hamad International Airport	
Russia	Moscow	Sheremetyevo International Airport	Terminated
Saudi Arabia	Dammam	King Fahd International Airport	
Saudi Arabia	Jeddah	King Abdulaziz International Airport	
Saudi Arabia	Medina	Prince Mohammad bin Abdulaziz International Airport	Seasonal
Saudi Arabia	Riyadh	King Khalid International Airport	
South Africa	Cape Town	Cape Town International Airport	Terminated
South Africa	Johannesburg	O. R. Tambo International Airport	Terminated
Spain	Barcelona	Josep Tarradellas Barcelona–El Prat Airport	Seasonal
Spain	Madrid	Madrid–Barajas Airport	
Switzerland	Geneva	Geneva Airport	
Turkey	Istanbul	Istanbul Airport	
United Arab Emirates	Abu Dhabi	Zayed International Airport	
United Arab Emirates	Dubai	Dubai International Airport	
United Kingdom	London	Heathrow Airport	
United Kingdom	Manchester	Manchester Airport	Terminated
United States	Chicago	O'Hare International Airport	Terminated
United States	Detroit	Detroit Metropolitan Airport	Terminated
United States	Los Angeles	Los Angeles International Airport	Terminated
United States	New York City	John F. Kennedy International Airport	Terminated

== Frequent-flyer program ==
In 2011, Middle East Airlines - Air Liban changed its frequent-flyer program to a 4-tier program - Blue Cedar, Silver Cedar, Golden Cedar, and President's Club, respectively, in preparation for joining the SkyTeam airline alliance. Silver Cedar, Golden Cedar, and President's Club members gain numerous benefits such as access to the Cedar Lounge at Beirut-Rafic Hariri International Airport, as well as outstation lounges at all MEA destinations. Golden Cedar and President's Club offer additional benefits, including guaranteed economy seat reservation.

Cedar Miles can be earned and redeemed on all MEA flights and on all flights operated by Air France, KLM, and Qatar Airways, as well as codeshare partners on certain routes. Cedar Miles can also be earned during stays at all Rotana Hotels and all Hertz car rentals worldwide.

== Subsidiaries ==
MEA owns the following subsidiaries, which are operated independently:

- Cedar Executive

Founded in January 2016, Cedar Executive is a private jet service based at Beirut Rafic Hariri International Airport which operates business flights across Europe and the Middle East, using two Embraer Legacy 500s. Clients have access to a private lounge and chauffeur service to the flight.

- Middle East Airlines Ground Handling (MEAG)

Founded in 1999, MEAG is the main ground handling agent at Beirut International Airport, handling nearly 80% of all traffic. MEAG also operates a fixed-base operator called Cedar Jet Center at the General Aviation Terminal.

- Middle East Airports Services (MEAS)

Founded in 1998, MEAS is responsible for the operation and maintenance of Beirut International Airport. Services range from cleaning of the terminals to de-rubberising the runways.

- Mideast Aircraft Services Company (MASCO)

Founded in 1955, MASCO is the only fully-fledged aircraft maintenance, repair, and overhaul provider at Beirut International Airport. MASCO is a part 145 EASA-approved MRO with full airframe check capabilities on the Airbus A300, A310, A320, and A330 family aircraft. MASCO is also certified to carry out aircraft painting.

- Fly Beirut

MEA has announced the establishment of a new low cost airline, to be called Fly Beirut. It is planned to launch sometime in 2027, with a focus on Middle Eastern and European destinations (currently under study).

In addition, MEA owns 77.5% of the Lebanese Beirut Airport Catering Company (LBACC), the only catering provider at Beirut International Airport.

=== Codeshare agreements ===
MEA has codeshare agreements with the following airlines:

- Air Canada
- Air Europa
- Air France
- Etihad Airways
- Gulf Air
- ITA Airways
- Kuwait Airways
- Qatar Airways
- Saudia
- Sky Express
- TAROM
- Turkish Airlines
- Virgin Atlantic

MEA also participates in SNCF's (French National Railways) tgvair program.

== Fleet ==
=== Current fleet ===
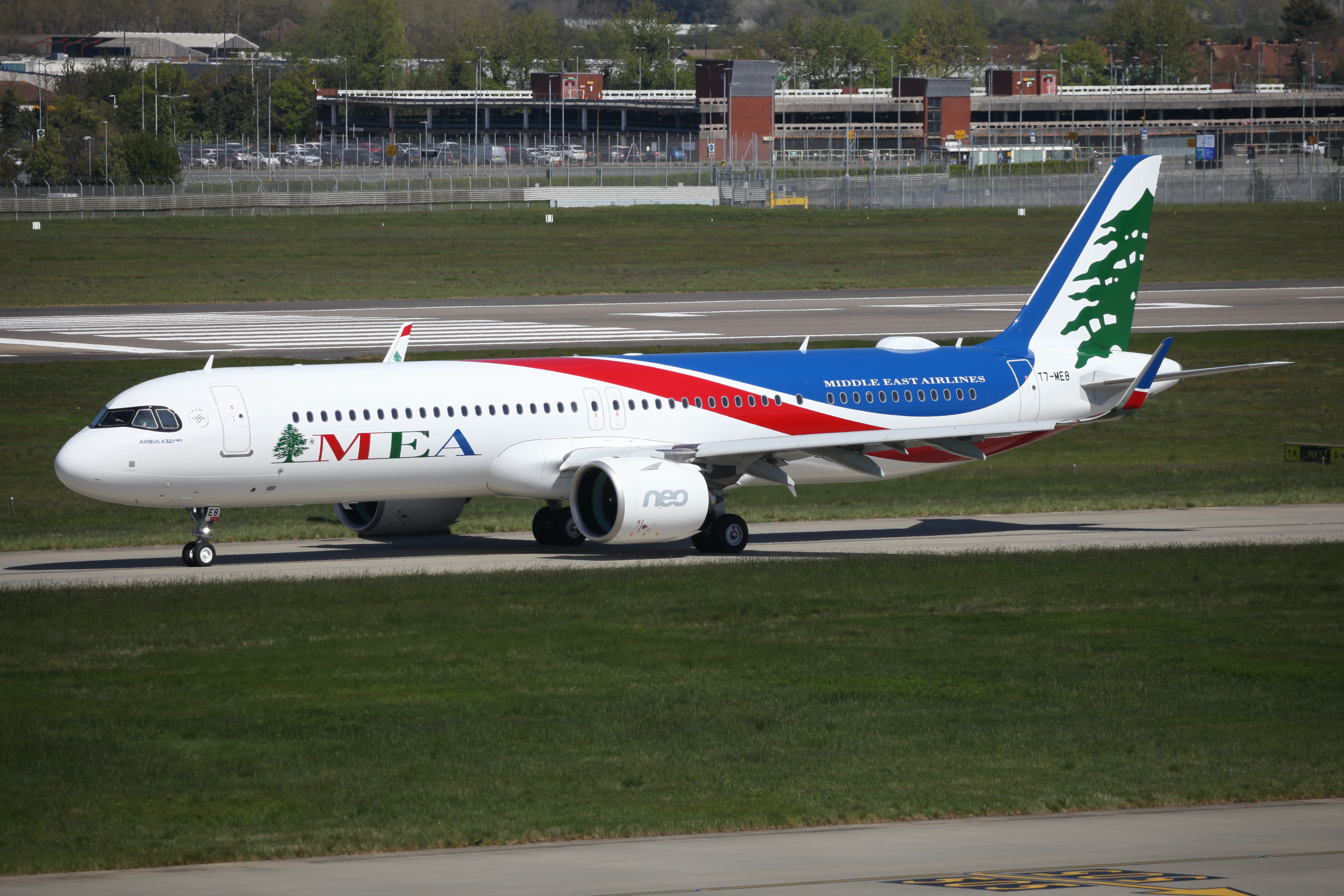
An Airbus A321neo in the current livery

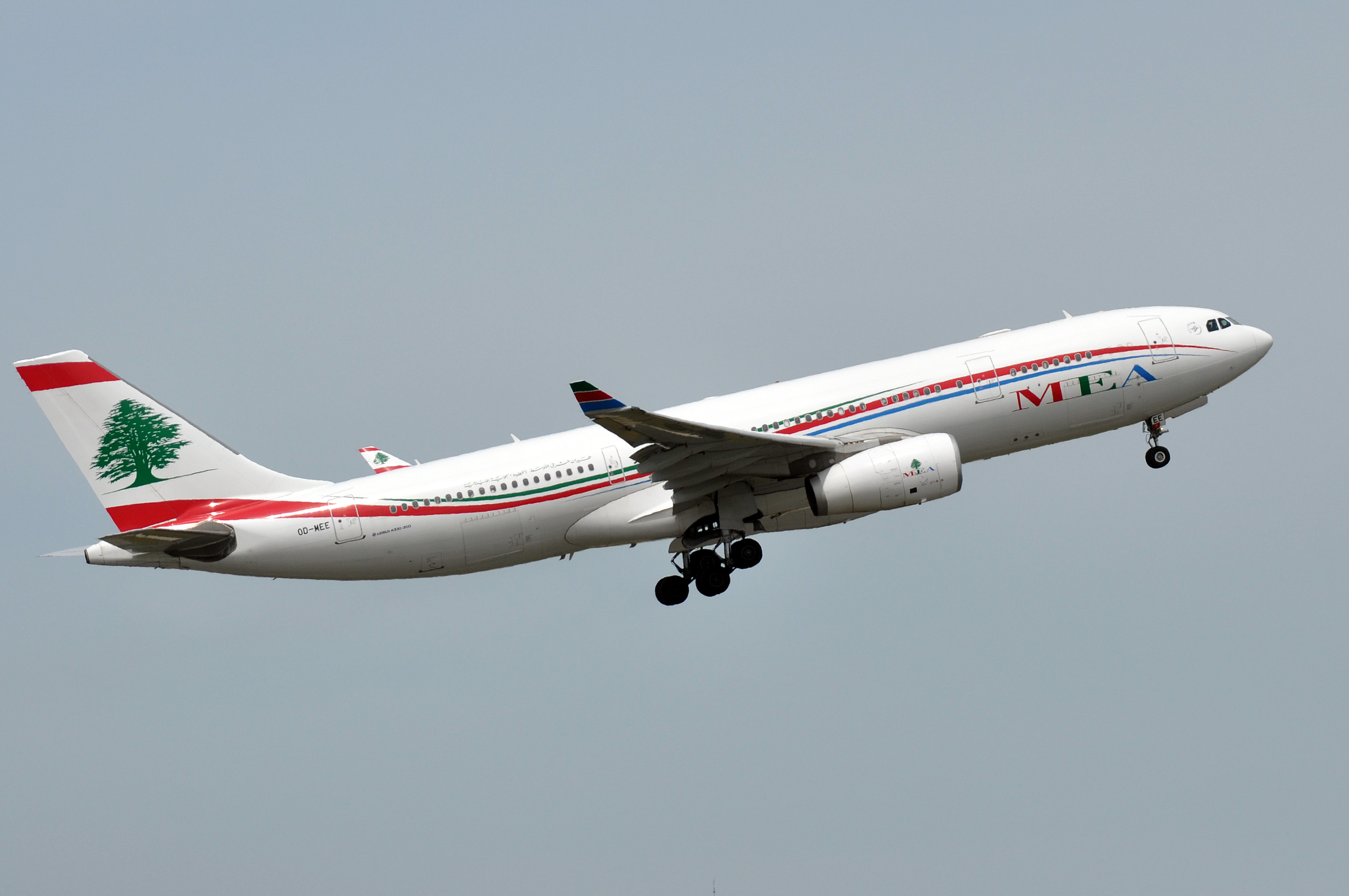
An Airbus A330-200

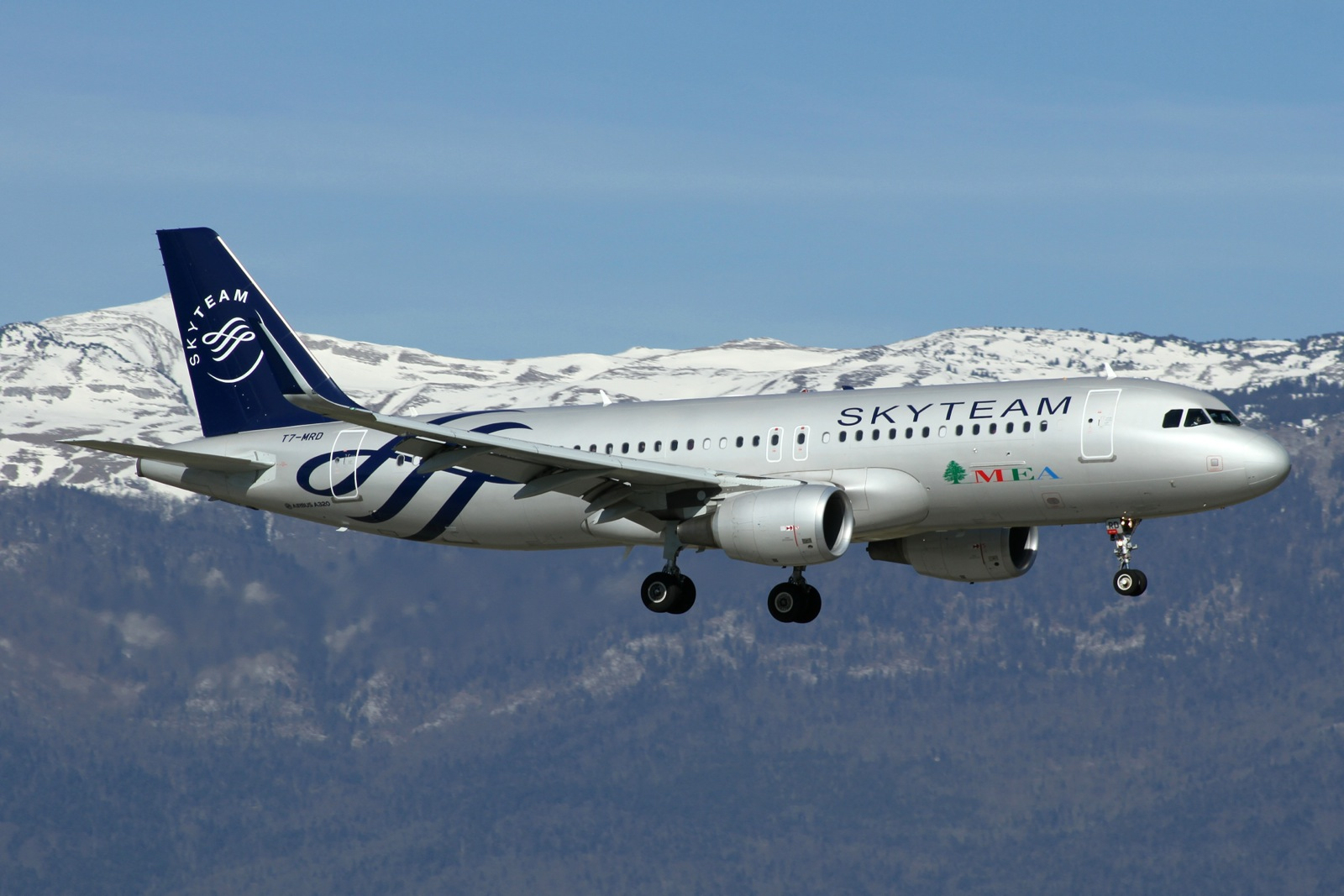
An Airbus A320-200 in the SkyTeam livery

As of July 2026, Middle East Airlines operates the following aircraft:

Middle East Airlines - Air Liban fleet
Aircraft	In service	Orders	Passengers			Notes
Aircraft	In service	Orders	J	Y	Total	Notes
Airbus A320-200	8	—	24	102	126	
Airbus A321neo	10	1	28	132	160	
Airbus A321XLR	1	3	22	138	160	Deliveries from November 2026.
Airbus A330-200	4	—	44	200	244	
Airbus A330-900	—	4	42	238	280	
Cedar Executive Fleet
Embraer Legacy 500	2	—	12	—	12	
Total	25	8				

=== Fleet development ===
Middle East Airlines - Air Liban firmed up its order for ten Airbus A320neo family aircraft (five A320neo and five A321neo) in January 2013. The order for the A320neo was later converted to five more A321neo aircraft. The first A321neo was delivered on 10 July 2020; the third, delivered 9 October 2020, was the 10,000th A320 family aircraft produced. Two more A321neo aircraft are expected to join the airline's fleet in 2024, summing up the whole A321neo fleet size to 11.

On 12 December 2018, the then-Prime Minister of Lebanon, Saad Hariri, signed an order with engine manufacturer Rolls-Royce Holdings for four Airbus A330-900s. During the 2019 Paris Air Show, the airline became the then launch customer for the A321XLR: four XLRs were ordered, intended for use on routes to Africa and Asia. MEA's first upcoming A330-900 has been spotted at Airbus' Toulouse Blagnac Airport in January 2026. It is estimated that the first unit will be delivered by June 2026.

Cedar Executive, MEA's business jet subsidiary, took delivery of its first Embraer Legacy 500 on 5 January 2016.

=== Former fleet ===
As of August 2025, Middle East Airlines operated 7 Airbus A320, 10 Airbus A321neo and 4 Airbus A330-200.

A Flight International list published in April 1982 showed the airline as operating 3 Boeing 747-200B, 5 Boeing 707-320C, and 16 Boeing 720B.

== Accidents and incidents ==
- On 24 July 1950, an Air Liban Douglas DC-3 registered as LR-AAN was shot at by an Israeli Spitfire; the DC-3 landed safely at Beirut Airport, but 3 passengers (of 28 on board) were killed in the attack.
- On 6 January 1952, an Air Liban SNCASE Languedoc registered as OD-ABU crashed on take-off from Beirut Airport, and was consequently destroyed by fire. All nine passengers and crew on board survived. The aircraft was operating a scheduled international passenger flight from Beirut to Kuwait Airport, Kuwait.
- On 29 September 1958, Middle East Airlines Avro York registered as OD-ADB disappeared over the Mediterranean Sea with five on board.
- On 1 February 1963, Flight 265, a Vickers Viscount 754D registered as OD-ADE, was involved in a mid-air collision with Turkish Air Force C-47 CBK28. Both aircraft crashed in Ankara, killing all 14 on board the Viscount, all 3 on board the C-47 and a further 87 people on the ground.
- On 17 April 1964, Flight 444 operated by Sud Caravelle III registered as OD-AEM struck the sea near Dhahran, Saudi Arabia, killing all 49 on board; the cause of the accident was not determined.
- On 21 April 1964, a Middle East Airlines Vickers Viscount 754D registered as OD-ACX was damaged beyond economic repair at El Arish, Egypt after the taxiway it was taxiing on collapsed.
- On 28 December 1968, seven (Note: Vickers Viscount OD-ACT; Sud Caravelles OD-AEE and OD-AEF; de Havilland Comets OD-ADQ, OD-ADR and OD-ADS; Boeing 707 OD-AFC; and a Ghana Airways Vickers VC10 (9G-ABP) operating for MEA) MEA aircraft were destroyed in a raid by Israeli commandos at Beirut International Airport. This attack was in retaliation for a terrorist attack on an El Al Boeing aircraft in Athens which killed an Israeli mechanic. The attack drew a sharp rebuke from the US, who stated that nothing suggested that the Lebanese authorities had anything to do with the El Al attack.
- On 1 January 1976, Flight 438, operated by Boeing 720B registered as OD-AFT, broke up in mid-air after the explosion of a bomb allegedly placed in the forward cargo compartment. All 81 people on board were killed, some of whom were fleeing the ongoing Lebanese Civil War. The aircraft crashed near Al Qaysumah, Saudi Arabia.

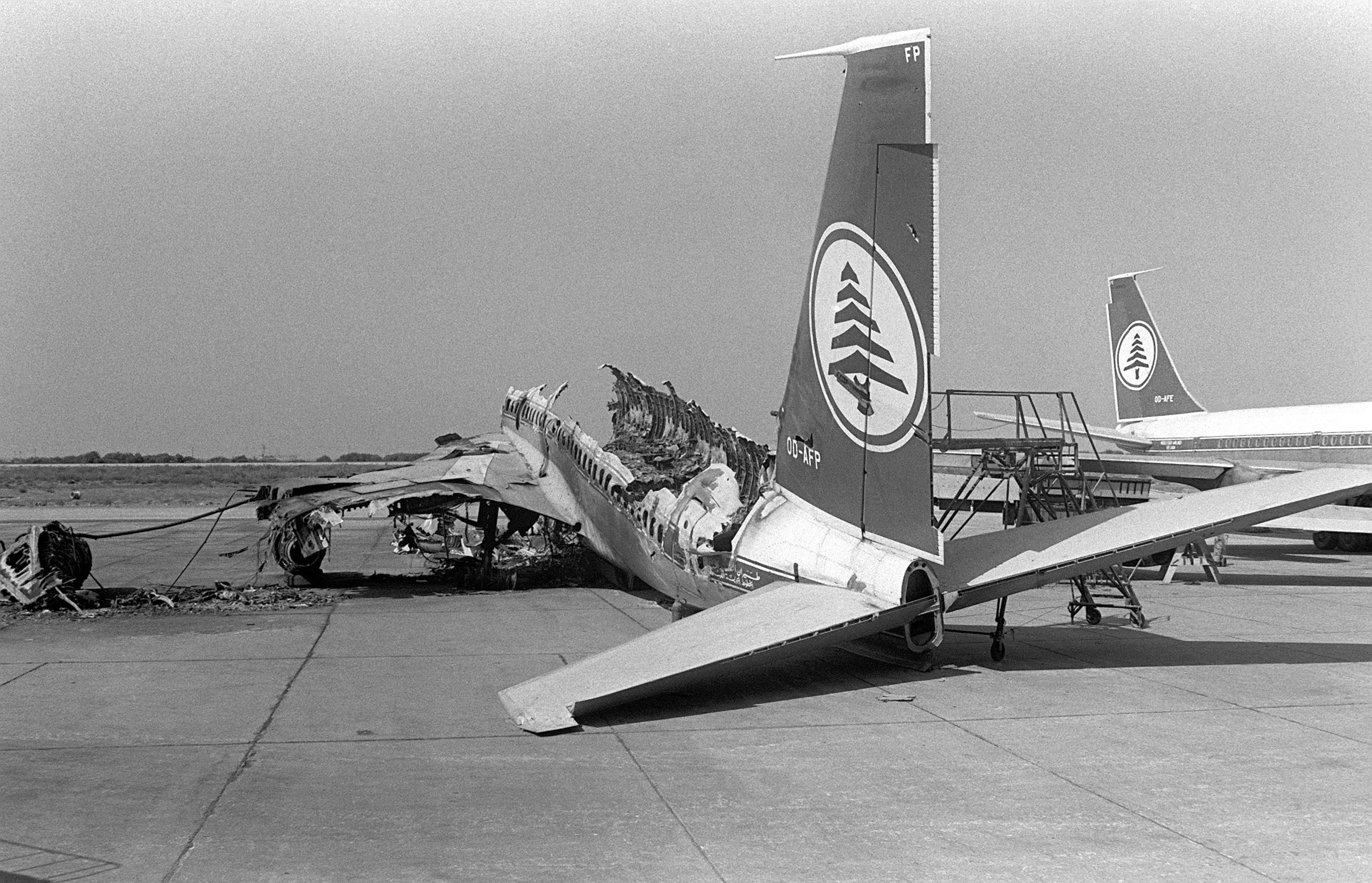
A Boeing 707 destroyed by the Israeli army in 1982

- On 12 June 1982, in response to the attempted assassination by the Abu Nidal Group of the Israeli ambassador to Britain, the Israeli army attacked the airport in Beirut, destroying Middle East Airlines Boeing 720-023B OD-AFP. Four days later, four more aircraft (three 720s and one 707) were destroyed in a second attack. On 1 August 1982, a 14-hour non-stop bombing raid on Beirut destroyed Boeing 720-047B OD-AGG.
- On 21 August 1985, two MEA Boeing 720s (OD-AFL and OD-AGQ) were destroyed by shelling at Beirut International Airport.
- On 8 January 1987, a Boeing 707-323C registered as OD-AHB was destroyed by shelling after landing at Beirut International Airport.
- On 16 November 2001, an Airbus A321-200 registered as F-OHMP was operating as Flight 304 from Beirut International Airport to Cairo International Airport when it sustained damage during a tail strike accident upon landing at Cairo. This airframe would be destroyed by a bomb nearly 14 years later midflight as Metrojet Flight 9268.

== See also ==
- Lebanese identity card
- List of airports in Lebanon
- Lebanese passport
- SkyTeam
- Transport in Lebanon
- Visa policy of Lebanon
- Visa requirements for Lebanese citizens
