= Lebanese International Airways =

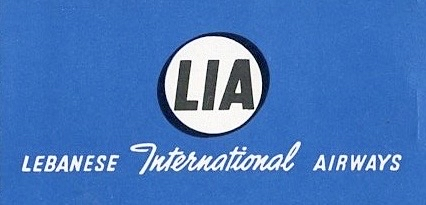
Logo of this airline in 1964.

Lebanese International Airways was a Lebanese airline based in Beirut. Formed with help from Pan Am, it began scheduled flights in January 1956, and by 1958 had expanded its network through agreements with Sabena of Belgium. By the mid-1960s, LIA's destinations included Tehran, Kuwait City, Baghdad, Bahrain, Paris, and Milan. Operations ceased in January 1969, after most of its fleet was destroyed by an Israeli military raid on Beirut International Airport. The airline was taken over by Middle East Airlines Air Liban.

== Fleet ==
Aircraft operated by LIA included

- Convair 990
- Curtiss C-46 Commando
- Douglas DC-3/C-47
- Douglas DC-4
- Douglas DC-6
- Douglas DC-7
