= 1968 Israeli raid on Beirut Airport =

Israeli Special Forces raid at Beirut Airport

Operation Gift
- Part of the Palestinian insurgency in South Lebanon
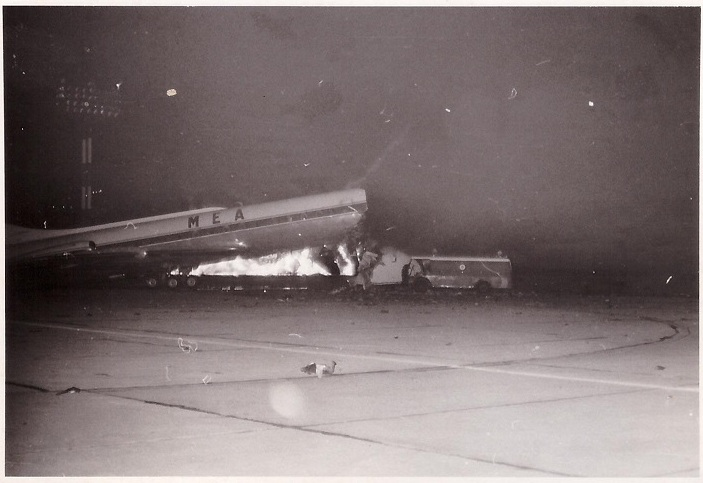
- Burning MEA Caravelle
- Planned by: Israel Defense Forces
- Objective: Destroy Middle East Airlines passenger planes on Beirut International Airport
- Date: December 28, 1968; 57 years ago
- Executed by: Sayeret Matkal
- Outcome: Israeli success

Operation Gift (Hebrew: מבצע תשורה, mivtza t'shura) was an Israeli Special Forces operation at the Beirut International Airport on the evening of 28 December 1968, in retaliation for the attack on the Israeli Airliner El Al Flight 253 two days earlier and the hijacking of El Al Flight 426 five months earlier, both by the Lebanon and Syria-based Popular Front for the Liberation of Palestine (PFLP).

The commandos from the Israeli Defence Forces elite Sayeret Matkal destroyed 12 passenger airplanes (Note: references differ; less reliable reports quote a total of 13 aircraft) belonging to Middle East Airlines (MEA) and Lebanese International Airways (LIA) and two cargo planes belonging to Trans Mediterranean Airways (TMA). There were no casualties reported in the raid.

== Operation ==
At 20:37 on 28 December 1968, eight Israeli Air Force Super Frelon helicopters and eight Bell helicopters took off from Ramat David Airbase for Lebanon. Six of the Super Frelon helicopters carried the attack force, which consisted of 64 Sayeret Matkal commandos, with the other two acting in reserve. Seven of the Bell helicopters were assigned an active role in the mission, with one remaining in reserve. Of the seven, five were to act in support of evacuating the commandos, one was to serve as command center of the operation, and another was to provide support in patrol and transmission.

The helicopters rendezvoused 12 kilometers off the Lebanese coast before moving towards Beirut. A force of 36 commandos was held on standby for quick deployment at Ramat David Airbase in case a rescue mission would have to be carried out. Two A-4 Skyhawk attack aircraft and two Vautour fighter-bombers also orbited to provide air support against any Lebanese military intervention if needed. Two Nord Noratlas transport aircraft were also deployed to orbit so they could assist with the evacuation afterwards, while another two were deployed for dropping flares, transmission, and maritime rescue. A Boeing 707 was positioned over northern Israel to provide radio relay. A refueling point was established at Betzet Aerodrome for any helicopters in need of it. Anticipating the possibility that the airport could not be secured for an evacuation, an alternative exit by sea was planned. The Israeli Navy deployed four missile boats and two torpedo boats off the Lebanese coast. One of the torpedo boats had to return to base due to engine trouble, while the rest of the force took positions about 25 kilometers off the Lebanese coast. Shayetet 13 naval commandos in 13 rubber dinghies moved to within 1,500 meters of the shore to stand by and prepared to establish an alternative evacuation point if needed.

As the commandos landed at Beirut International Airport, they split into three groups - Uzi Force, Digli Force, and Negbi Force (each named after their respective commanders). Meanwhile, one of the Bell helicopters, which was carrying Brigadier General Rafael Eitan, the overall commander of the mission, landed near the terminal to serve as the operation's command center. Another Bell helicopter, flown by Eliezer Cohen, dropped 20 smoke flares and 95 smoke grenades in front of the buildings to obscure the commandos from the view of the terminal and control tower, then dropped nails on the roads leading to the airport, which halted six approaching cars. Vehicles in the airport trying to escape and emergency vehicles rushing to the scene subsequently created a traffic jam which served as an effective block. Cohen then turned to orbit to provide support and observation to detect any potential Lebanese military reinforcements. At one point, he spotted an apparent military truck trying to evade the jam and enter the airport and fired warning shots at it, causing it to come to a halt.

Uzi Force, consisting of 22 soldiers, landed on the north edge of the western runway and found numerous parked airliners. They wired three aircraft parked close to each other with explosives and detonated them, destroying them collectively. After that, they secured the area and destroyed the other aircraft individually, wiring explosives to the nose wheels and main gear of the other aircraft and detonating them. While carrying out their task, the commandos fired warning shots at a vehicle and airport workers which approached them. They did not enter the military area of the airport, where several planes were being serviced, so as to avoid a confrontation with the Lebanese military. After completing their task, the commandos proceeded towards the evacuation point, the location where the two main runways intersected, which was codenamed "London".

Digli Force, with 20 soldiers, landed to the south and moved northward, establishing a perimeter and isolating the emergency services building. They spotted four airliners. Three of them were positively identified as Lebanese, wired with explosives, and destroyed. While destroying the aircraft, they came under sporadic small-arms fire from the terminal building, likely pistol fire from airport security guards who were firing through the smokescreen. They responded with warning shots with heavy weapons, after which the firing ceased. They then proceeded towards the evacuation point.

Negbi Force, which consisted of 22 soldiers, moved towards the airport's east ramp and found numerous airliners. Four airliners which were confirmed to be Arab, three parked on the runway and one in a hangar, were wired with explosives and destroyed. The commandos then moved towards the evacuation point. On the way there, they spotted the airport's fuel depot and requested but were denied permission to destroy it.

After half an hour, all of the commandos had assembled at the evacuation point and were picked up by the helicopters. After a headcount, the commandos and the command element took off and returned to Israel. After the naval force standing by off the Lebanese coast received a report that the commandos had been successfully evacuated, it withdrew and returned to Haifa naval base.

According to a legend told among Israeli special forces soldiers, during the closing stages of the raid, Rafael Eitan entered the terminal building after the small arms fire had ceased. Observing it in a state of disorder and with no security guards present, he walked to a coffee shop, ordered a coffee, drank it quickly, and paid for it in Israeli currency before leaving.

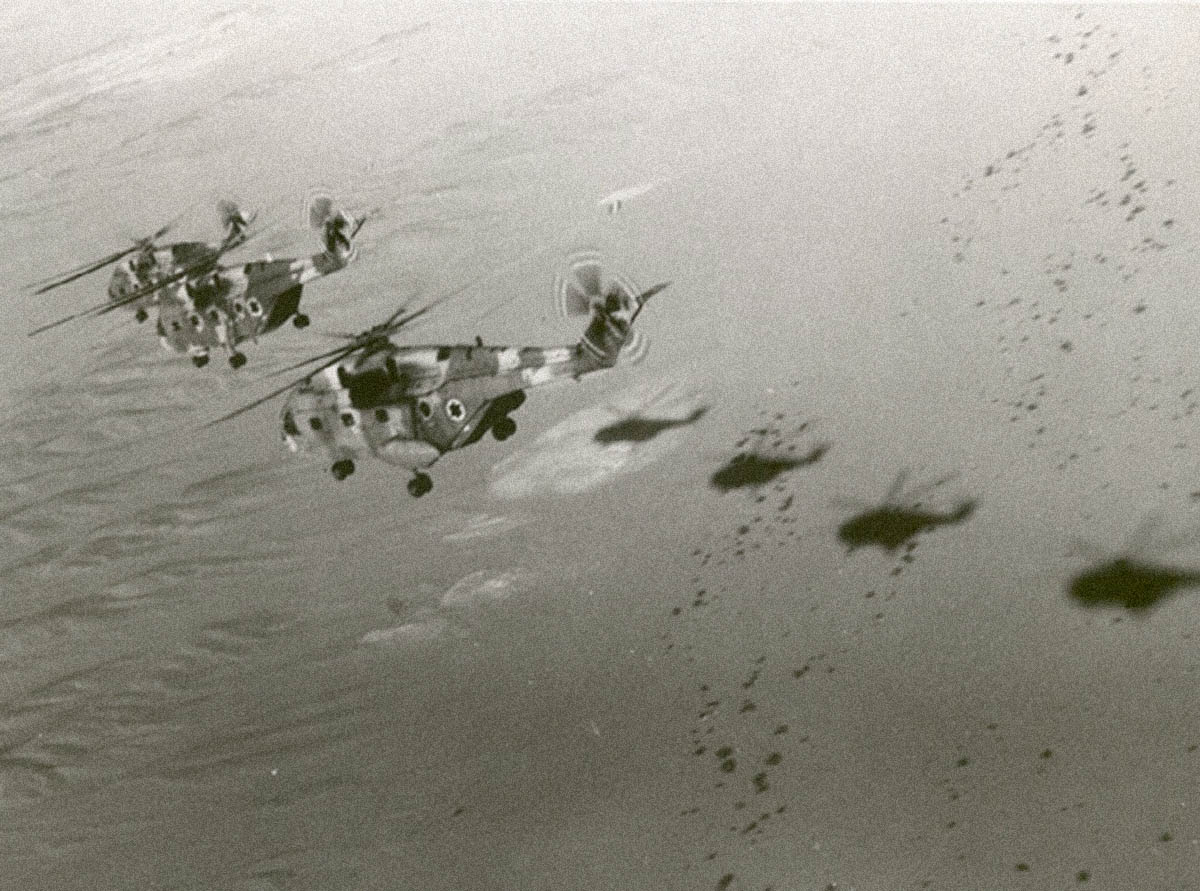
Super Frelon transport helicopters, like the ones used in Operation Gift

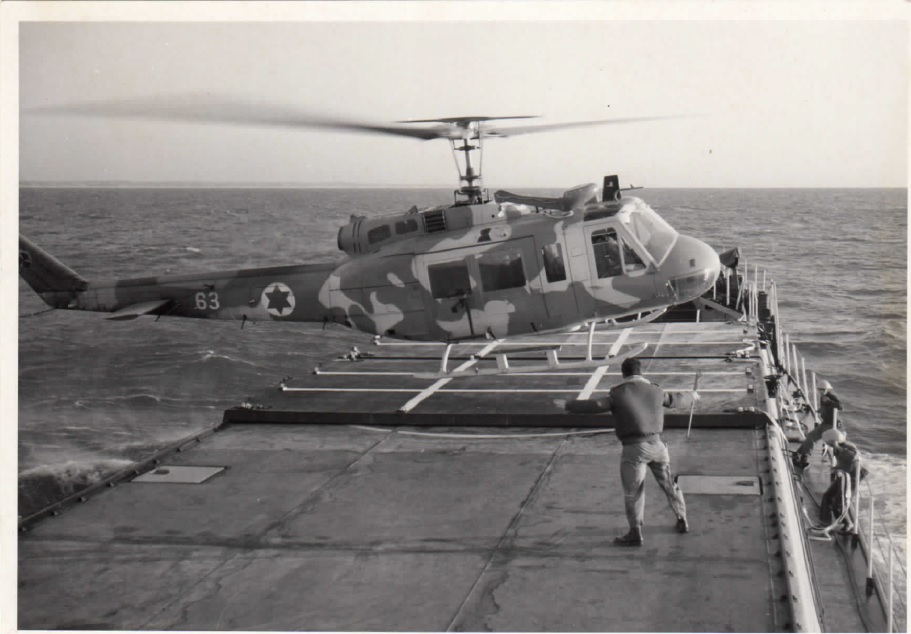
A Bell 205 multipurpose helicopter of the IAF, used in Operation Gift

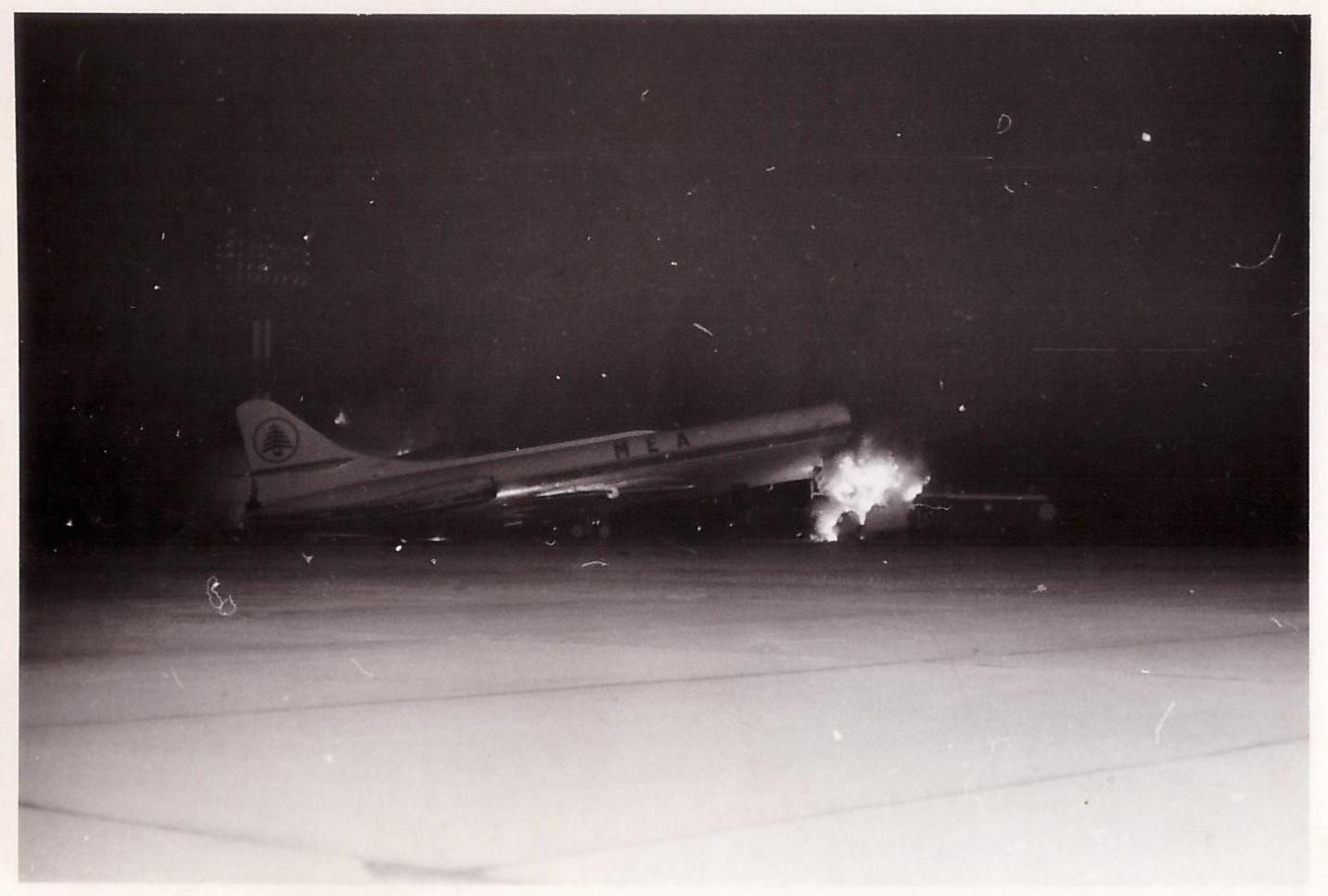
A destroyed Sud Aviation Caravelle after the raid

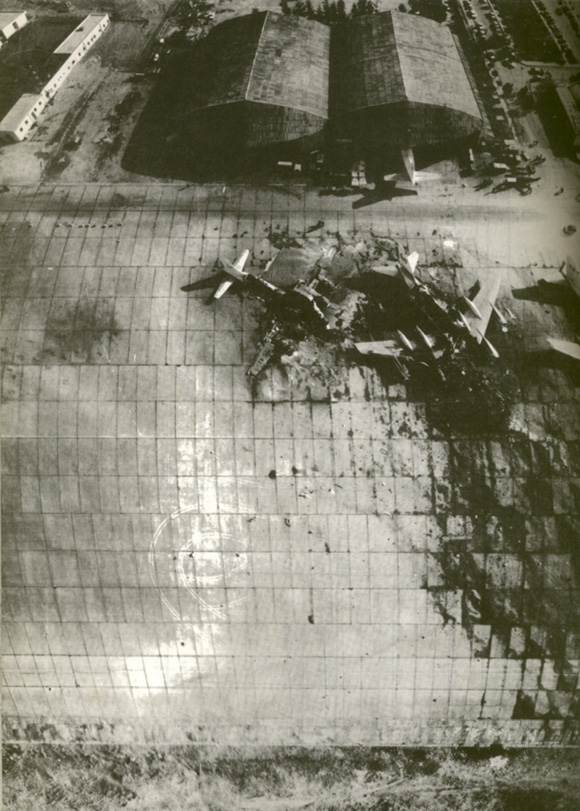
Destroyed civil aircraft at Beirut Airport

== Expenses ==
Of the 14 aircraft destroyed, 8 (1 Vickers VC-10 (on lease from Ghana Airways), 1 Boeing 707-320C, 2 Caravelle VIN, 3 Comet 4C and 1 Vickers Viscount) belonged to MEA, which was 30% owned by Air France, 5% by Lebanese individuals and 65% by the Intra Investment Company. Intra was an inter-governmental corporation constituted by the Kuwaiti, Qatari, Lebanese and American governments. The US was represented by the Commodity Credit Corporation, which was owed money by Intra Bank, the predecessor of Intra Company, for wheat sales.

Lebanese International Airways owned 4 of the destroyed aircraft (2 Douglas DC-7 and 2 Convair 990 Coronado) which were 58% American owned.

Trans-Mediterranean Airways lost 2 planes (1 Douglas DC-4 and 1 Douglas DC-6) owned by private Lebanese individuals.

The total value of the planes was estimated to be $43.8 million, of which British insurers initially agreed to pay $18 million, excluding all policies that did not cover acts of war.

== Criticism ==
The attack drew widespread international condemnation. The United Nations Security Council adopted Resolution 262 on 31 December 1968, which condemned Israel for the "premeditated military action in violation of its obligations under the Charter and the cease-fire resolutions", issued a "solemn warning to Israel that if such acts were to be repeated, the Council would have to consider further steps to give effect to its decisions", and stated that Lebanon was entitled to appropriate redress. The resolution was adopted unanimously.

The raid resulted in a sharp rebuke from the United States, which stated that nothing suggested that the Lebanese authorities had anything to do with the El Al Flight 253 attack.

France, which had a historic association with Lebanon, reacted sharply to the attack. President Charles de Gaulle considered it a personal affront and diplomatic provocation. The French government recalled its ambassador to Israel and subsequently imposed an arms embargo, with the Israeli use of French-built helicopters in the raid cited as a factor.

== See also ==
- Operation Entebbe
- Operation Opera
- Operation Outside the Box
- Operation Wooden Leg
