= Med Airways =

Lebanese airline

IATA	ICAO	Call sign
7Y	MED	FLYING CARPET
- Founded: 2000 (As Flying Carpet)
- Ceased operations: 2015
- Hubs: Beirut Rafic Hariri International Airport
- Fleet size: 1
- Destinations: 7
- Headquarters: Beirut, Lebanon
- Key people: Mazen Bsat (CEO)
- Website: http://www.medairways.com/

Med Airways was a small Lebanese charter airline. It ceased all operations in 2015.

== History and profile ==
It was named as Flying Carpet until 2009. Its fleet consisted of one Swearingen SA-227 Metro 19-seat turboprop airplane, one Piper PA-28, one Piper PA-32 and one Piper PA-34. In 2006 it received two Boeing 737-200 formerly owned by Southwest Airlines and Delta Air Lines and later received a Bombardier CRJ-200ER formerly owned by Independence Air. In 2009 the name was changed to Med Airways.

== Destinations ==
- Iraq
  - Baghdad - Baghdad International Airport
  - Basra - Basra International Airport
  - Erbil - Erbil International Airport
  - Sulaymaniyah - Sulaimaniyah International Airport
- Lebanon
  - Beirut - Beirut Rafic Hariri International Airport Base
- Sudan
  - Khartoum - Khartoum International Airport
- Sweden
  - Stockholm - Arlanda Airport

== Fleet ==
=== Current fleet ===
The Med Airways fleet consists of the following aircraft (as of August 2017):

- 1 Bombardier CRJ200ER

=== Former fleet ===
The airline fleet consisted of the following aircraft (as of December 2012):

- 2 Boeing 737-200
- 1 Bombardier CRJ-200ER
- 1 Swearingen SA-227 Metro
- 1 Piaggio P.180 Avanti
- 1 Piper PA-34 Seneca
- 1 Piper PA-32
- 1 Piper PA-28
