= Al-Thuqbah =

Neighborhood in Khobar, Eastern Province, Saudi Arabia

Al-Thuqbah (Arabic: الثقبة, pronounced ath-Thugba) is one of the historic and most renowned neighborhoods in the city of Al-Khobar in the Eastern Province in Saudi Arabia, with a population of 248,888 as of 2022. It was originally constructed by ARAMCO in the early fifties. Due to its location and broad width, Al-Thuqbah is known to be the main entrance to Al-Khobar through Al-Dharan Street, which approaches from Half Moon Beach, connects Al-Khobar to Bahrain, Dammam, and Dhahran, and contains most centers and shopping malls. It is followed by Industrial Thuqbah and Al-Bayoniah District (named after the tradesman Ibn Bayoni).

== Name Origin ==
The neighborhood was named after a source of water that originated from a small hole previously known as “Al-Thuqb”, which literally translates to “the hole”. People residing near “Al-Thuqb” started linking their address to it. “Al-Thuqb” grew to be the eminent neighborhood now known as Al-Thuqbah.

== Government Departments in Al-Thuqbah ==
- Al-Thuqbah Police Department
- Al-Khobar Traffic Management Center
- Al-Khobar General Prison Administration
- Education Administration for males in Al-Khobar
- The commission for promotion of virtue and prevention of vice branch
- Mabarat Al Ehsan Al Khayriyah Charity Center in Al-Khobar
- The Saudi Mail Administration in Al-Khobar
- Al-Khobar Municipality
- Saudi Telecom Administration in Al-Khobar

== Hospitals and Health Centers ==
- Ibn Alnafees Health Center (governmental)
- Ibn Hayan Health Center (governmental)
- Al-Bayoniah Health Center (governmental)
- Mohammed Aldossary Hospital
- Alyousif Hospital
- Aljazeerah Medical Compound
- Silver Crescent Health Center
- Al-Khobar National Health Center
- Shopping malls and centers
- Venecia mall
- Dossary Towers
- Al Hosson Commercial Center
- Ibn Jumaa Trading Center
- Souq Al Kuwait

== Main Roads ==
- King Abdullah bin Abdullaziz Road
- King Khalid bin Abdullaziz Road
- King Fahad bin Abdullaziz Road
- Makkah Road
- Riyadh Road
- Fourth Street
- Tenth Street
- Fifteenth Street
- Twentieth Street
- Twenty Fifth Street
- Thirtieth Street
- Al-Khobar Road

== Sources ==
- 2004 Saudi Census Figures for the Eastern Province
