= List of Republic of China Navy ships =

The Republic of China Navy is the maritime branch of the Republic of China Armed Forces. The ROC Navy's primary mission is to defend ROC territories and the sea lanes that surround Taiwan against a blockade, attack, or possible invasion by the People's Liberation Army Navy of the People's Republic of China. Operations include maritime patrols in the Taiwan Strait and surrounding waters, as well as counter-strike and counter-invasion operations during wartime. The Republic of China Marine Corps functions as a branch of the Navy.

The ship prefix for ROCN combatants is ROCS (Republic of China Ship); an older usage is CNS (Chinese Navy Ship).

ROCN also avoids giving ships hull numbers that add up to or end at "4", as the Chinese pronunciation of the number 4 is close to the pronunciation of "death". This numbering scheme is more apparent on more newly acquired ships.

Note: The ROCN generally uses hull classification symbols similar to the U.S. system with some changes. The proper classification is provided when known.

== Submarine fleet ==
Class	In service	Picture	Type	Origin	Builder	Ship	No.	Comm.	Displacement	Notes
Current fleet (4)
Hai Shih-class (former Tench-class)	2		Attack Submarine (diesel-electric)	United States	Portsmouth Naval Shipyard	ROCS Hai Shih (USS Cutlass)	SS-791 (–)	12 Apr 1973 (17 Mar 1945)	1,550 tonnes (surfaced); 2,463 tonnes (submerged)	
Hai Shih-class (former Tench-class)	2		Attack Submarine (diesel-electric)	United States	Cramp Shipbuilding Company	ROCS Hai Bao (USS Tusk)	SS-792 (–)	18 Oct 1973 (11 Apr 1946)	1,595 tonnes (surfaced); 2,453 tonnes (submerged)	
Hai Lung-class	2		Attack Submarine (diesel-electric)	Netherlands	Wilton-Fijenoord	ROCS Hai Lung	SS-793	9 Oct 1987	2,376 tonnes (surfaced); 2,660 tonnes (submerged)	Known as Zwaardvis-class in the Netherlands Navy.
Hai Lung-class	2		Attack Submarine (diesel-electric)	Netherlands	Wilton-Fijenoord	ROCS Hai Hu	SS-794	9 Apr 1988	2,376 tonnes (surfaced); 2,660 tonnes (submerged)	Known as Zwaardvis-class in the Netherlands Navy.

== Surface combat fleet ==
Class	In service	Picture	Type	Origin	Builder	Ship	No.	Comm.	Displacement	Notes
Destroyers (4)
Kee Lung-class (former Kidd class)	4		Guided-missile destroyers	United States	Ingalls Shipbuilding	ROCS Kee Lung (USS Kidd)	DDG-1801 (DDG-993)	30 May 2003 (27 Mar 1981)	9,783 tonnes	Decommissioned by the U.S. Navy and transferred to Taiwan in the early 2000s.
Kee Lung-class (former Kidd class)	4		Guided-missile destroyers	United States	Ingalls Shipbuilding	ROCS Su Ao (USS Callaghan)	DDG-1802 (DDG-994)	30 May 2003 (29 Aug 1981)	9,783 tonnes	Decommissioned by the U.S. Navy and transferred to Taiwan in the early 2000s.
Kee Lung-class (former Kidd class)	4		Guided-missile destroyers	United States	Ingalls Shipbuilding	ROCS Tso Ying (USS Scott)	DDG-1803 (DDG-995)	30 May 2003 (24 Oct 1981)	9,783 tonnes	Decommissioned by the U.S. Navy and transferred to Taiwan in the early 2000s.
Kee Lung-class (former Kidd class)	4		Guided-missile destroyers	United States	Ingalls Shipbuilding	ROCS Ma Kong (USS Chandler)	DDG-1805 (DDG-996)	30 May 2003 (13 Mar 1982)	9,783 tonnes	Decommissioned by the U.S. Navy and transferred to Taiwan in the early 2000s.
Frigates (21)
Chi Yang-class (former Knox class)	5		ASW frigates	United States	Avondale Shipyard	ROCS Fong Yang (USS Brewton)	FFG-933 (FF-1086)	29 Sep 1999 (8 Jul 1972)	3,877 tonnes	Some of the ships of this class have been decommissioned by Taiwan already.
Chi Yang-class (former Knox class)	5		ASW frigates	United States	Avondale Shipyard	ROCS Fen Yang (USS Kirk)	FFG-934 (FF-1087)	29 Sep 1999 (9 Sep 1972)	3,877 tonnes	Some of the ships of this class have been decommissioned by Taiwan already.
Chi Yang-class (former Knox class)	5		ASW frigates	United States	Avondale Shipyard	ROCS Hwai Yang (USS Barbey)	FFG-937 (FF-1088)	29 Sep 1999 (11 Nov 1972)	3,877 tonnes	Some of the ships of this class have been decommissioned by Taiwan already.
Chi Yang-class (former Knox class)	5		ASW frigates	United States	Avondale Shipyard	ROCS Ning Yang (USS Aylwin)	FFG-938 (FF-1081)	29 Apr 1998 (18 Sep 1971)	3,877 tonnes	Some of the ships of this class have been decommissioned by Taiwan already.
Chi Yang-class (former Knox class)	5		ASW frigates	United States	Avondale Shipyard	ROCS Yi Yang (USS Valdez)	FFG-939 (FF-1096)	18 Oct 1999 (27 Jul 1974)	3,877 tonnes	Some of the ships of this class have been decommissioned by Taiwan already.
Oliver Hazard Perry class	2		Guided-missile frigates	United States	Bath Iron Works	ROCS Ming Chuan (USS Taylor)	PFG-1112 (FFG-50)	8 Nov 2018 (5 Nov 1983)	4,300 tonnes	Second-hand US frigates sold to Taiwan.
Oliver Hazard Perry class	2		Guided-missile frigates	United States	Todd Pacific Shipyards	ROCS Feng Jia (USS Gary)	PFG-1115 (FFG-51)	8 Nov 2018 (17 Nov 1984)	4,300 tonnes	Second-hand US frigates sold to Taiwan.
Cheng Kung-class (derived from Oliver Hazard Perry class)	8		Guided-missile frigates	United States; Republic of China (licence-built)	CSBC Corporation, Taiwan (licence-built)	ROCS Cheng Kung	PFG-1101	7 May 1993	4,300 tonnes	Design based on the Oliver Hazard Perry-class frigates, made under licence in Taiwan.
Cheng Kung-class (derived from Oliver Hazard Perry class)	8		Guided-missile frigates	United States; Republic of China (licence-built)	CSBC Corporation, Taiwan (licence-built)	ROCS Cheng Ho	PFG-1103	28 Mar 1994	4,300 tonnes	Design based on the Oliver Hazard Perry-class frigates, made under licence in Taiwan.
Cheng Kung-class (derived from Oliver Hazard Perry class)	8		Guided-missile frigates	United States; Republic of China (licence-built)	CSBC Corporation, Taiwan (licence-built)	ROCS Chi Kuang	PFG-1105	4 Mar 1995	4,300 tonnes	Design based on the Oliver Hazard Perry-class frigates, made under licence in Taiwan.
Cheng Kung-class (derived from Oliver Hazard Perry class)	8		Guided-missile frigates	United States; Republic of China (licence-built)	CSBC Corporation, Taiwan (licence-built)	ROCS Yueh Fei	PFG-1106	7 Feb 1996	4,300 tonnes	Design based on the Oliver Hazard Perry-class frigates, made under licence in Taiwan.
Cheng Kung-class (derived from Oliver Hazard Perry class)	8		Guided-missile frigates	United States; Republic of China (licence-built)	CSBC Corporation, Taiwan (licence-built)	ROCS Tzu I	PFG-1107	9 Jan 1997	4,300 tonnes	Design based on the Oliver Hazard Perry-class frigates, made under licence in Taiwan.
Cheng Kung-class (derived from Oliver Hazard Perry class)	8		Guided-missile frigates	United States; Republic of China (licence-built)	CSBC Corporation, Taiwan (licence-built)	ROCS Pan Chao	PFG-1108	16 Dec 1997	4,300 tonnes	Design based on the Oliver Hazard Perry-class frigates, made under licence in Taiwan.
Cheng Kung-class (derived from Oliver Hazard Perry class)	8		Guided-missile frigates	United States; Republic of China (licence-built)	CSBC Corporation, Taiwan (licence-built)	ROCS Chang Chien	PFG-1109	1 Dec 1998	4,300 tonnes	Design based on the Oliver Hazard Perry-class frigates, made under licence in Taiwan.
Cheng Kung-class (derived from Oliver Hazard Perry class)	8		Guided-missile frigates	United States; Republic of China (licence-built)	CSBC Corporation, Taiwan (licence-built)	ROCS Tian Dan	PFG-1110	11 Mar 2004	4,300 tonnes	Design based on the Oliver Hazard Perry-class frigates, made under licence in Taiwan.
Kang Ding-class (La Fayette class)	6		Frigate	France	DNCS	ROCS Kang Ding	PFG-1202	24 May 1996	3,800 tonnes	
Kang Ding-class (La Fayette class)	6		Frigate	France	DNCS	ROCS Si Ning	PFG-1203	5 Oct 1996	3,800 tonnes	
Kang Ding-class (La Fayette class)	6		Frigate	France	DNCS	ROCS Kun Ming	PFG-1205	26 Feb 1997	3,800 tonnes	
Kang Ding-class (La Fayette class)	6		Frigate	France	DNCS	ROCS Di Hua	PFG-1206	14 Aug 1997	3,800 tonnes	
Kang Ding-class (La Fayette class)	6		Frigate	France	DNCS	ROCS Wu Chang	PFG-1207	16 Dec 1997	3,800 tonnes	
Kang Ding-class (La Fayette class)	6		Frigate	France	DNCS	ROCS Chen De	PFG-1208	19 Mar 1998	3,800 tonnes	
Corvettes (9)
Ching Chiang-class	1		Corvette	Republic of China	CSBC Corporation, Taiwan	ROCS Jin Chiang	PGG-610	15 Feb 2000	730 tonnes	
Tuo Chiang-class (flight 0)	1		Corvette	Republic of China	Lung Teh Shipbuilding Co.	ROCS Tuo Chiang	PGG-618	23 Dec 2014	502 tonnes	
Tuo Chiang-class (flight 1)	6		Corvette	Republic of China	Lung Teh Shipbuilding Co.	ROCS Ta Chiang	PGG-619	27 Jul 2021	685 tonnes	
Tuo Chiang-class (flight 1)	6		Corvette	Republic of China	Lung Teh Shipbuilding Co.	ROCS Fu Chiang	PGG-620	28 Jun 2023	685 tonnes	
Tuo Chiang-class (flight 1)	6		Corvette	Republic of China	Lung Teh Shipbuilding Co.	ROCS Hsu Chiang	PGG-621	6 Feb 2024	685 tonnes	
Tuo Chiang-class (flight 1)	6		Corvette	Republic of China	Lung Teh Shipbuilding Co.	ROCS Wu Chiang	PGG-622	1 Mar 2024	685 tonnes	
Tuo Chiang-class (flight 1)	6		Corvette	Republic of China	Lung Teh Shipbuilding Co.	ROCS An Chiang	PGG-625	26 Mar 2024	685 tonnes	
Tuo Chiang-class (flight 1)	6		Corvette	Republic of China	Lung Teh Shipbuilding Co.	ROCS Wan Chiang	PGG-626	26 Mar 2024	685 tonnes	
Tuo Chiang-class (flight 2)	1		Corvette	Republic of China	Lung Teh Shipbuilding Co.	ROCS Tan Chiang	PGG-627	26 Jul 2026	685 tonnes	Ships delivered in 2026, but not commissioned yet.
Missile boats (30)
Kung Hua VI-class	30		Missile boat	Republic of China	CSBC Corporation, Taiwan	–	FACG-61-66	2003 to Oct 2011	171 tonnes	
Kung Hua VI-class	30		Missile boat	Republic of China	CSBC Corporation, Taiwan	–	FACG-68-75	2003 to Oct 2011	171 tonnes	
Kung Hua VI-class	30		Missile boat	Republic of China	CSBC Corporation, Taiwan	–	FACG-77-84	2003 to Oct 2011	171 tonnes	
Kung Hua VI-class	30		Missile boat	Republic of China	CSBC Corporation, Taiwan	–	FACG-86-93	2003 to Oct 2011	171 tonnes	
Mine warfare boats (10)
Min Jiang-class	4		Coastal minelayer	Republic of China	Lung Teh Shipbuilding Co.	–	FMLB-1	2020	347 tonnes	
Min Jiang-class	4		Coastal minelayer	Republic of China	Lung Teh Shipbuilding Co.	–	FMLB-2	Sep 2021	347 tonnes	
Min Jiang-class	4		Coastal minelayer	Republic of China	Lung Teh Shipbuilding Co.	–	FMLB-3	Dec 2021	347 tonnes	
Min Jiang-class	4		Coastal minelayer	Republic of China	Lung Teh Shipbuilding Co.	–	FMLB-4	Dec 2021	347 tonnes	
Yung Jin-class (forme Osprey class)	2		Minehunter	United States	Intermarine USA	ROCS Yung Jin (USS Oriole)	MHC-1310 (MHC-55)	10 Aug 2012 (16 Sep 1995)	796 tonnes	
Yung Jin-class (forme Osprey class)	2		Minehunter	United States	Intermarine USA	ROCS Yung An (USS Falcon)	MHC-1311 (MHC-59)	10 Aug 2012 (8 Feb 1997)	796 tonnes	
Yung Feng-class	4		Costal minehunter	Germany	Abeking & Rasmussen	ROCS Yung Feng	MHC-1301	1991	508 tonnes	
Yung Feng-class	4		Costal minehunter	Germany	Abeking & Rasmussen	ROCS Yung Chia	MHC-1302	1991	508 tonnes	
Yung Feng-class	4		Costal minehunter	Germany	Abeking & Rasmussen	ROCS Yung Nien	MHC-1303	1991	508 tonnes	
Yung Feng-class	4		Costal minehunter	Germany	Abeking & Rasmussen	ROCS Yung Shun	MHC-1305	1991	508 tonnes	
Amphibious warfare ships (8)
Yushan-class	1		Landing platform dock	Republic of China	CSBC Corporation, Taiwan	ROCS Yu Shan	LPD-1401	19 Jun 2023	10,600 tonnes	
Hsu Hai-class (forme Anchorage class)	1		Dock landing ship	United States	Fore River Shipyard	ROCS Hsu Hai (USS Pensacola)	LSD-193 (LSD-38)	Jul 2000 (27 Mar 1971)	14,225 tonnes	
Chung He-class (forme Newport class)	2		Tank landing ship	United States	Philadelphia Naval Shipyard	ROCS Chung Ho (USS Manitowoc)	LST-232 (LST-1180)	29 Sep 2000 (24 Jan 1970)	4,870 tonnes (empty); 8,475 tonnes (full)	
Chung He-class (forme Newport class)	2		Tank landing ship	United States	Philadelphia Naval Shipyard	ROCS Chung Ping (USS Sumter)	LST-233 (LST-1181)	8 May 1997 (20 Jun 1970)	4,870 tonnes (empty); 8,475 tonnes (full)	
Chung Hai-class (forme LST-542-class)	4		Tank landing ship	United States	Jeffersonville Boat & Machine Co	ROCS Chung Chien	LST-205 (LST-716)	18 Aug 1944 (7 Feb 1948)	1,650 tonnes (empty); 4,145 tonnes (full)	
Chung Hai-class (forme LST-542-class)	4		Tank landing ship	United States	American Bridge Company	ROCS Chung Chie	LST-218 (LST-279)	30 Jun 1955 (25 Oct 1943)	1,650 tonnes (empty); 4,145 tonnes (full)	
Chung Hai-class (forme LST-542-class)	4		Tank landing ship	United States	Chicago Bridge and Iron Co.	ROCS Chung Ming (USS Sweetwater County)	LST-227 (LST-1152)	21 Oct 1958 (30 Jun 1945)	1,650 tonnes (empty); 4,145 tonnes (full)	
Chung Hai-class (forme LST-542-class)	4		Tank landing ship	United States	Jeffersonville Boat & Machine Co	ROCS Chung Yeh	LST-231 (LST-717)	12 Jun 1946 (23 Aug 1944)	1,650 tonnes (empty); 4,145 tonnes (full)	

== Auxiliary fleet ==
Class	In service	Picture	Type	Origin	Builder	Ship	No.	Comm.	Displacement	Notes
Support ships (2)
Wu Yi-class	1		Fast combat support ship	Republic of China	CSBC Corporation	ROCS Wu Yi	AOE-530	23 Jun 1990	17,000 tonnes	
Pan Shi-class	1		Fast combat support ship	Republic of China	CSBC Corporation	ROCS Pan Shi	AOE-532	31 Mar 2015	20,000 tonnes	
Rescue ships (1)
Da-Wu-class	1 (+ 5 on order)		Rescue and salvage ship	Republic of China	CSBC Corporation	ROCS Da Wu	ARS-571	31 Oct 2025	3,250 tonnes	
Survey ships (1)
Da-Quan-class	1		Research vessel (survey ship)	Italy	Fincantieri	ROCS Ta Kuan	AGS-1601	1995	3,180 tonnes	
Landing craft utility (13)
Ho Zhi-class (forme 501-class)	1		Landing craft utility	Republic of China	Navy Left Battalion Logistics Support Command; Navy Magong Logistics Support Command	-	SB-2	1950	100 tonnes (empty); 143 tonnes (full)	transport and supply use in Navy ports
Ho Zhi-class (forme 1610-class)	12		Landing craft utility	Republic of China	Navy Left Battalion Logistics Support Command; Navy Magong Logistics Support Command	ROCS He Cheng	LCU-497	1979	400 tonnes	
Ho Zhi-class (forme 1610-class)	12		Landing craft utility	Republic of China	Navy Left Battalion Logistics Support Command; Navy Magong Logistics Support Command	ROCS He Gong Ⅱ	LCU-498	1979	400 tonnes	
Ho Zhi-class (forme 1610-class)	12		Landing craft utility	Republic of China	Navy Left Battalion Logistics Support Command; Navy Magong Logistics Support Command	ROCS He Cyun Ⅱ	LCU-481	1979	400 tonnes	
Ho Zhi-class (forme 1610-class)	12		Landing craft utility	Republic of China	Navy Left Battalion Logistics Support Command; Navy Magong Logistics Support Command	ROCS He Chuna Ⅱ	LCU-489	1979	400 tonnes	
Ho Zhi-class (forme 1610-class)	12		Landing craft utility	Republic of China	Navy Left Battalion Logistics Support Command; Navy Magong Logistics Support Command	ROCS He Chao Ⅱ	LCU-406	1979	400 tonnes	
Ho Zhi-class (forme 1610-class)	12		Landing craft utility	Republic of China	Navy Left Battalion Logistics Support Command; Navy Magong Logistics Support Command	ROCS He Yong Ⅲ	LCU-495	2011	400 tonnes	
Ho Zhi-class (forme 1610-class)	12		Landing craft utility	Republic of China	Navy Left Battalion Logistics Support Command; Navy Magong Logistics Support Command	ROCS He Mao Ⅱ	LCU-492	2011	400 tonnes	
Ho Zhi-class (forme 1610-class)	12		Landing craft utility	Republic of China	Navy Left Battalion Logistics Support Command; Navy Magong Logistics Support Command	ROCS He Shou Ⅱ	LCU-493	2011	400 tonnes	
Ho Zhi-class (forme 1610-class)	12		Landing craft utility	Republic of China	Navy Left Battalion Logistics Support Command; Navy Magong Logistics Support Command	ROCS He Yao Ⅱ	LCU-403	2011	400 tonnes	
Ho Zhi-class (forme 1610-class)	12		Landing craft utility	Republic of China	Navy Left Battalion Logistics Support Command; Navy Magong Logistics Support Command	ROCS He Zhen Ⅱ	LCU-486	2011	400 tonnes	
Ho Zhi-class (forme 1610-class)	12		Landing craft utility	Republic of China	Navy Left Battalion Logistics Support Command; Navy Magong Logistics Support Command	ROCS He Zhong Ⅱ	LCU-484	2011	400 tonnes	

== Future fleet ==
Class	On order	Picture	Type	Origin	Builder	Ship	No.	Comm.	Displacement	Notes
light frigate-class	2 (Under construction)		light frigate	Republic of China	Jong Shyn Shipbuilding Company			2027 (planned)	~ 3.000 tonnes	
light frigate-class	2 (Under construction)		light frigate	Republic of China	Jong Shyn Shipbuilding Company			2027 (planned)	~ 3.000 tonnes	

== Submarine fleet ==
Class	On order	Picture	Type	Origin	Builder	Ship	No.	Comm.	Displacement	Notes
Hai Kun-class	1 (under sea trial)		Attack Submarine (diesel-electric)	Republic of China	CSBC Corporation, Taiwan	ROCS Hai Kun	SS-711	2026 (planned)	~ 2.500 tonnes	
Hai Kun-class (smaller / improved Hai Kun-class)	2 (contract signed)	–	Attack Submarine (Lithium-ion battery-diesel-electric)	Republic of China	CSBC Corporation, Taiwan	–	–	–	–	Ordered in 2025. Total of 8 vessels planned.
Hai Kun-class (smaller / improved Hai Kun-class)	2 (contract signed)	–	Attack Submarine (Lithium-ion battery-diesel-electric)	Republic of China	CSBC Corporation, Taiwan	–	–	–	–	Ordered in 2025. Total of 8 vessels planned.

== Decommissioned ships ==
=== Long Chiang-class patrol boats ===
US designed; based on PSMM MK.5

- ROCS Long Chiang (PG-601) – built by Tacoma Boatbuilding Company
- ROCS Sui Chiang (PG-602) – built by China Shipbuilding Corporation

=== Hai Ou-class missile boat (Dvora-class) ===
- FABG-1~59 (no 4, 13, 22, 31, 40); all were decommissioned by 2013; two were gifted to Paraguay in 1994 and 4 were gifted to Gambia in 2009; replaced by Kung Hua VI project missile boats

=== PCL-class offshore patrol craft ===
- 9 locally designed and built. 143 tons fully load. All decommissioned in 2011.

=== SX-404-class submarine ===
Decommissioned in 1973.

- ROCS Hai Jiao (海蛟)
- ROCS Hai Lung (海龍)

=== Ex United States Navy ships ===
Chi Yang-class frigate (Knox-class)

- ROCS Chi Yang FFG-932 (ex USN FF-1073) retired 2015
- ROCS Hai Yang FFG-936 (ex USN FF-1083) retired 2015
- ROCS Lan Yang FFG-935 (ex USN FF-1078) retired 2025

Chao Yang-class destroyer (Gearing-class) World War II era DDs later upgraded to DDGs in three batches, Wu Chin I, II and III. All ships in this class were retired by 2005.

Wu Chin I Batch: (Retired in 1980s-1990s)

- ROCS Dang Yang DD-11 (ex USN DD-764)
- ROCS Fu Yang DD-7 (ex USN DD-838)

Wu Chin II Batch: (Retired in late 1990s)

- ROCS Tse Yang DDG-930 (ex USN DD-873)
- ROCS Han Yang DDG-915 (ex USN DD-833)
- ROCS Kai Yang DDG-924 (ex USN DD-786)
- ROCS Lai Yang DDG-920 (ex USN DD-790)
- ROCS Sheui Yang DDG-926 (ex USN DD-852)

Wu Chin III Batch: (Retired in 2003–2004)

- ROCS Chien Yang DDG-912 (ex USN DD-787)
- ROCS Liao Yang DDG-921 (ex USN DD-832)
- ROCS Shen Yang DDG-923 (ex USN DD-839)
- ROCS Te Yang DDG-925 (ex USN DD-837)
- ROCS Yun Yang DDG-927 (ex USN DD-718)
- ROCS Chen Yang DDG-928 (ex USN DD-821)
- ROCS Shao Yang DDG-929 (ex USN DD-788)

Benson-class destroyers

- ROCS Luo Yang DD-14 (ex USN DD-421)
- ROCS Han Yang DD-15 (ex USN DD-427)

Gleaves-class destroyers

- ROCS Nan Yang DD-16 (ex USN DD-431)
- ROCS Xian Yang DD-15 (ex USN DD-456)

Fletcher-class destroyers

- ROCS An Yang DD-918 (ex USN DD-521)
- ROCS Qing Yang DD-909 (ex USN DD-528)
- ROCS Gui Yang DD-908 (ex USN DD-540)
- ROCS Kun Yang DD-919 (ex USN DD-541)

Allen M. Sumner-class destroyers

- ROCS Hui Yang DD-906 (ex USN DD-696)
- ROCS Yue Yang DD-905 (ex USN DD-700)
- ROCS Bo Yang DD-910 (ex USN DD-731)
- ROCS Xiang Yang DD-901 (ex USN DD-745)
- ROCS Luo Yang DD-914 (ex USN DD-746)
- ROCS Heng Yang DDG-902 (formerly DD-2, ex USN DD-747)
- ROCS Nan Yang DDG-917 (formerly DD-17, ex USN DD-760)
- ROCS Hua Yang DD-903 (ex USN DD-857)

Ashland-class dock landing ship

- ROCN Zhong Zheng LSD-191 (Dong Hai, ex USN LSD-8)

Casa Grande-class dock landing ships

- ROCN Zhong Zheng LSD-191 (ex USN LSD-19)
- ROCN Zhen Hai LSD-192 (ex USN LSD-22)

Evarts-class destroyer escorts

- ROCS Tai Kang F-21 (ex USN DE-6)
- ROCS Tai Ping F-22 (ex USN DE-47)

Cannon-class destroyer escorts

- ROCN Tai He F-23 (ex USN DE-102)
- ROCN Tai Cang F-24 (ex USN DE-103)
- ROCN Tai Hu F-25 (ex USN DE-104)
- ROCN Tai Zhao F-26 (ex USN DE-112)

Rudderow-class destroyer escort

- ROCN Tai Yuan F-827 (ex USN DE-579)

Yangtze Patrol gunboats

- ROCN Tai Yuan (ex USN PR-3)
- ROCN Mei Yuan (ex USN PR-4)

PCE-842-class patrol craft

- ROCN Shan Hai PF-41 (ex-Yong Tai, ex USS PCE-867)
- ROCN Wei Yuan PF-42 (ex-Yong Xing, ex USS PCE-869)

Admirable-class minesweepers

- ROCN Zhen Nan (ex-Yong Sheng) PF-43 (ex USN AM-257)
- ROCN Yu Men (ex-Yong Shun) PF-44 (ex USN AM-258)
- ROCN Yang Ming (ex-Yong Ding) PF-45 (ex USN AM-259)
- ROCN Yong Ning PF-46 (ex USN AM-260)
- ROCN Yong Jia PF-47 (ex USN AM-246)
- ROCN Yong Xiu PF-48 (ex USN AM-274)
- ROCN Zi Ling (ex-Yong Shou) PF-49 (ex USN AM-276)
- ROCN Yong Feng PF-50 (ex USN AM-279)
- ROCN Lin Huai (ex-Yong Chang) PF-51 (ex USN AM-287)
- ROCN Yong Chun PF-52 (ex USN AM-363)
- ROCN Yong He PF-53 (ex USN AM-217)
- ROCN Yong Kang PF-54 (ex USN AM-225)
- ROCN Yong Ming (ex USN AM-273)
- ex USN AM-266
- ex USN AM-286

Crosley-class high speed transports

- ROCN Tian Shan 315 (ex USN APD-134)
- ROCN Yu Shan PF-33 (ex USN APD-91)
- ROCN Hua Shan PF-33 (ex USN APD-129)
- ROCN Fu Shan PF-35 (ex USN APD-98)
- ROCN Shou Shan PF-37 (ex USN APD-120)
- ROCN Tai Shan PF-38 (ex USN APD-92)
- ROCN Heng Shan PF-39 (ex USN APD-121)

Charles Lawrence-class high speed transports

- ROCN Wen Shan PF-34 (ex USN APD-42)
- ROCN Lu Shan (ex USN APD-78)
- ROCN Gang Shan PF-42 (ex USN APD-43)
- ROCN PF-43 (ex USN APD-48)
- ROCN PF-44 (ex USN APD-76)

Auk-class minesweepers

- ROCN Jian Men PCE-45 (ex USN AM-387)
- ROCN Wu Sheng PCE-66 (ex USN AM-378)
- ROCN Ju Yong PCE-67 (ex USN AM-389)
- ROCN Ping Jing PCE-70 (ex USN AM-118)

PC-461-class submarine chasers

- ROCN Qing Jiang PC-116 (ex USN PC-1168)
- ROCN Xi Jiang PC-120 (ex USN PC-1149)
- ROCN Bei Jiang PC-122 (ex USN Hanford PC-1142)
- ROCN Wu Song (ex USN PC-490)
- ROCN Dong Ping (ex USN PC-1088)
- ROCN Song Ping (ex USN PC-1090)
- ROCN Gan Tang (ex USN PC-1091)
- ROCN Qian Tang (ex USN PC-1549)
- ROCN Tuo Jiang PC-104 (ex USN PC-1247)
- ROCN Pei Jiang PC-105 (ex USN PC-492)
- ROCN Xiang Jiang PC-108 (ex USN PC-786)
- ROCN Zi Jiang PC-109 (ex USN PC-1078)
- ROCN Yuan Jiang PC-110 (ex USN PC-1182)
- ROCN Li Jiang PC-111 (ex USN PC-1208)
- ROCN Gong Jiang PC-113 (ex USN PC-1233)
- ROCN Bo Jiang PC-114 (ex USN PC-1254)
- ROCN Chang Jiang PC-115 (ex USN PC-1262)
- ROCN Qing Jiang PC-116 (ex USN PC-1168)
- ROCN Zhu Jiang PC-117 (ex USN PC-1567)
- ROCN Zhang Jiang PC-118 (ex USN PC-1232)
- ROCN Dong Jiang PC-119 (ex USS Placerville PC-1087)
- ROCN Liu Jiang PC-123 (ex USS Escandido PC-1179)
- ROCN Gan Jiang PC-124 (ex USS Vandalia PC-1175)
- ROCN Tuo Jiang PC-125 (ex USS Milledgeville PC-1263)

PGM-9-class gunboat

- ROCN Yin Jiang (ex Bao Ying) PC-101 (ex USN PGM-20)
- ROCN Lin Jiang (ex Dong Ting) PC-102 (ex USN PGM-13)
- ROCN Ou Jiang (ex Hong Ze) PC-103 (ex USN PGM-26)

Infantry landing craft

- ROCN Lian Bi (ex USN LCI-516)
- ROCN Lian Guang (ex USN LCI-517)
- ROCN Lian Rong (ex USN LCI-632)
- ROCN Lian Zhen (ex USN LCI-514)
- ROCN Lian Zhu LCI-261 (ex USN LCI-233)
- ROCN Lian Li LCI-262 (ex USN LCI-417)
- ROCN Lian Shen LCI-263 (ex USN LCI-418)
- ROCN Lian Hua LCI-264 (ex USN LCI-630)
- ROCN Lian Zhen LCI-265 (ex USN LCI-631)
- ROCN Lian Jie LCI-266 (ex USN LCI)
- ROCN Lian Qiang LCI-266 (ex USN LCI-1017)
- ROCN Lian Zhi LCI-271 (ex USN LSSL-81)
- ROCN Lian Ren LCI-272 (ex USN LSSL-56)
- ROCN Lian Yong LCI-273 (ex USN LSSL-95)

Medium Landing ships

- ROCN Mei Shen (ex USN LSM-433)
- ROCN Mei Zhen LSM-341 (ex USN LSM-155)
- ROCN Mei Le LSM-342 (ex USN LSM-157)
- ROCN Mei Yi LSM-343 (ex USN LSM-285)
- ROCN Mei Peng LSM-344 (ex USN LSM-431)
- ROCN Mei Heng LSM-345 (ex USN LSM-456)
- ROCN Mei Hong LSM-346 (ex USN LSM-442)
- ROCN Mei Song LSM-347 (ex USN LSM-457)
- ROCN Mei He (ex Yong Ming) LSM-348 (ex USN LSM-13)
- ROCN Mei Jian LSM-349 (ex USN LSM-76)
- ROCN Mei Hua LSM-350 (ex USN LSM-456)
- ROCN Mei Cheng LSM-351 (ex USN LSM-422)
- ROCN Mei Gong LSM-352 (ex USN LSM-478)
- ROCN Mei Ping LSM-353 (ex USN LSM-471)
- ROCN Mei Wei LSM-354 (ex USN LSM-472)
- ROCN Mei Han LSM-355 (ex USN LSM-474)
- ROCN Mei Lo LSM-356 (ex USN LSM-362)

Tank landing ships

- ROCN Zhong Ye (ex USN LST-717)
- ROCN Zhong Hai LST-201 (ex USN LST-755)
- ROCN Zhong Quan LST-202 (ex USN LST-640)
- ROCN Zhong Ding (ex Zhong Xin) LST-203 (ex USN LST-537)
- ROCN Zhong Xing LST-204 (ex USN LST-557)
- ROCN Zhong Ji LST-206 (ex USN LST-1017)
- ROCN Zhong Cheng LST-207 (ex USN LST-1075)
- ROCN Zhong Xun LST-208 (ex USN LST-732)
- ROCN Zhong Lian LST-209 (ex USN LST-1050)
- ROCN Zhong Rong LST-210 (ex USN LST-574)
- ROCN Zhong Gong LST-213 (ex USN LST-945)
- ROCN Zhong Guang LST-216 (ex USN LST-503)
- ROCN Zhong Zhao LST-217 (ex USN LST-400 Bradley County)
- ROCN Zhong Xi (ex Gao Xiong) LST-219 (ex USN LST-735)
- ROCN Zhong Quan (Heng Shan) LST-221 (ex USN LST-1030)
- ROCN Zhong Sheng LST-222 (ex-211, ex USN LST-1033)
- ROCN Zhong Fu LST-223 (ex USN LST-840 Iron County)
- ROCN Zhong Cheng LST-224 (ex USN LST-859 Lafayette County)
- ROCN Zhong Qiang LST-225 (ex USN LST-306)
- ROCN Zhong Zhi LST-226 (ex USN LST-1091 Sagadahoc County)
- ROCN Zhong Su LST-228 (ex USN LST-520)
- ROCN Zhong Wang LST-229 (ex USN LST-535)
- ROCN Zhong Pang LST-230 (ex USN LST-578)

Amphibious Command ship

- ROCN Kao Hsiung LCC-1 (ex USN LST-735 Dukes County)

Repair ships

- ROCN Hsing An (ex USN ARL-41 Achilles)

=== Ex Royal Navy Ships ===
Arethusa-class cruiser

- ROCN Chong Qing (ex RN Aurora)

Flower-class corvette

- ROCN Fu Bo (ex RN K-79 Petunia)

Harbour Defence Motor Launches

- ROCN Fang 1 (ex RN ML-1033)
- ROCN Fang 2 (ex RN ML-1047)
- ROCN Fang 3 (ex RN ML-1058)
- ROCN Fang 4 (ex RN ML-1059)
- ROCN Fang 5 (ex RN ML-1068)
- ROCN Fang 6 (ex RN ML-1390)
- ROCN Fang 7 (ex RN ML-1405)
- ROCN Fang 8 (ex RN ML-1406)

Castle-class corvettes

- ROCN Gao An (ex RN Pembroke Castle)
- ROCN De An (ex RN Nunney Castle)

=== Ex Royal Italian Navy Ships ===
Azio-class minelayer

- ROCN Xian Ning (ex Regia Marina Lepanto)

=== Ex Imperial Japanese Navy Ships ===
- ROCN An Dong (ex IJN Ataka)
- ROCN Hao Xue (Yong Ji, ex IJN Toba)

Akizuki-class destroyer

- ROCN Fen Yang (ex IJN Yoizuki)

Atami-class gunboats

- ROCN Yong Ping (ex IJN Atami)
- ROCN Yong An (ex IJN Futami)

Etorofu-class escort ships

- ROCN Lin An (ex IJN Tsushima)
- ROCN Gu An (ex IJN )

Fushimi-class gunboats

- ROCN Jiang Feng (ex IJN Fushimi)
- ROCN Chiang Hsi (ex IJN Sumida)

Hashidate-class gunboat

- ROCN Chang Zhi (ex IJN Uji)

Hiburi-class escort ship

- ROCN Hui An (ex IJN Shisaka)

Kagerō-class destroyer

- ROCN Dan Yang DD-12 (ex IJN Yukikaze)

Matsu-class destroyers

- ROCN Heng Yang (ex IJN Kaede)
- ROCN Hui Yang (ex IJN Sugi)
- ROCN Xin Yang DD-15 (PF-82, ex IJN Hatsuume)
- ROCN Hua Yang (ex IJN Tsuta)

Mikura-class escort ship

- ROCN Zheng An (Xue Feng, ex IJN Yashiro)

Minekaze-class destroyer

- ROCN Shen Yang (ex IJN Namikaze)

No.4-class submarine chaser

- ROCN Min Jiang (Fu Ling) PC-107 (ex Hai Hong, SC-402, ex IJN # 9)

No.13-class submarine chaser

- ROCN Qu Jiang (Yang Long) PC-106 (ex Hai Hong, SC-401, ex IJN # 49)

Seta-class gunboat

- ROCN Chang De (ex IJN Seta)

Sokuten-class minelayer

- ROCN Yong Jing PF-75 (ex IJN Saishū)

Sokuten-class auxiliary minelayer

- ROCN Jie 29 (ex IJN Kuroshima)

Type C escort ship

- ROCN Rui An (Ying Kou, ex IJN # 67)
- ROCN Huang An (ex IJN # 81)
- ROCN Ji An (ex IJN # 85)
- ROCN Chao An (ex IJN # 107)
- ROCN Chang An (ex IJN # 205)
- ROCN Jie 8 (ex IJN # 215)

Type D escort ship

- ROCN Jie 6 (ex IJN # 14)
- ROCN Cheng An PF-72 (ex IJN # 40)
- ROCN Tai An PF-71 (ex IJN # 104)
- ROCN Jie 12 (ex IJN # 118)
- ROCN Tong An (ex IJN # 192)
- ROCN Wei Hai (ex IJN # 194)
- ROCN Jie 14 (ex IJN # 198)

== Weapons ==
=== Active ===
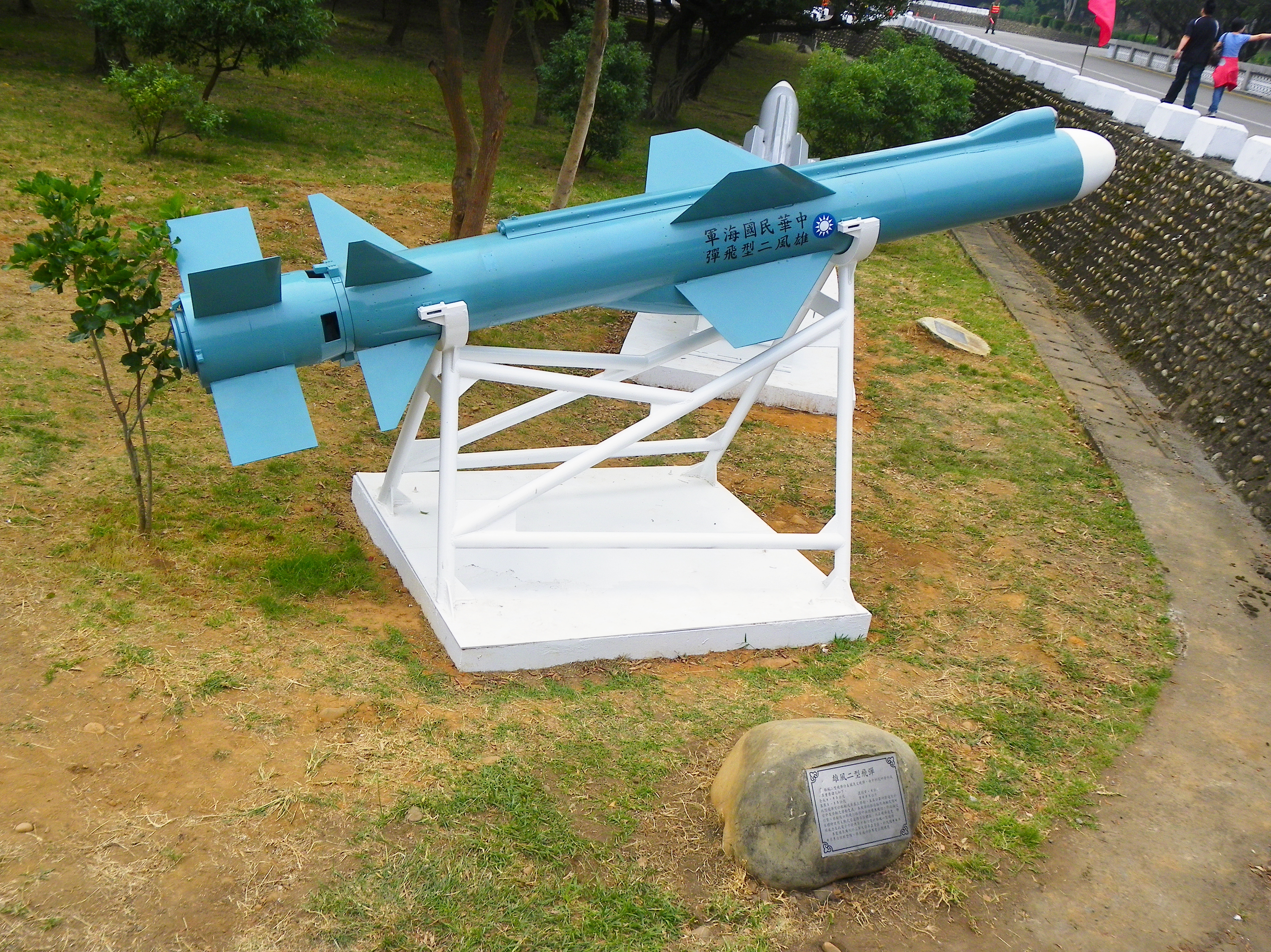
Hsiung Feng II Anti-Ship Missile

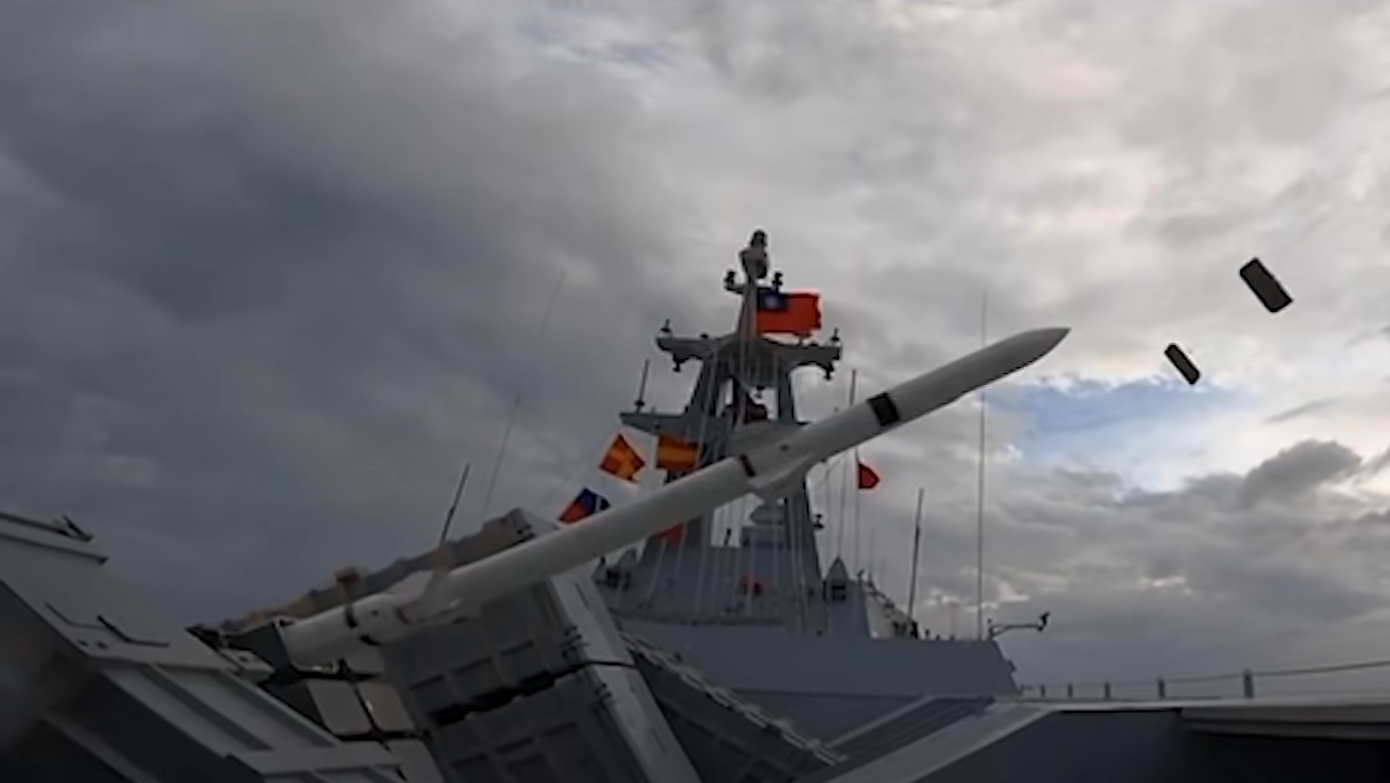
TC-2N missile fired from ROCS Ta Chiang

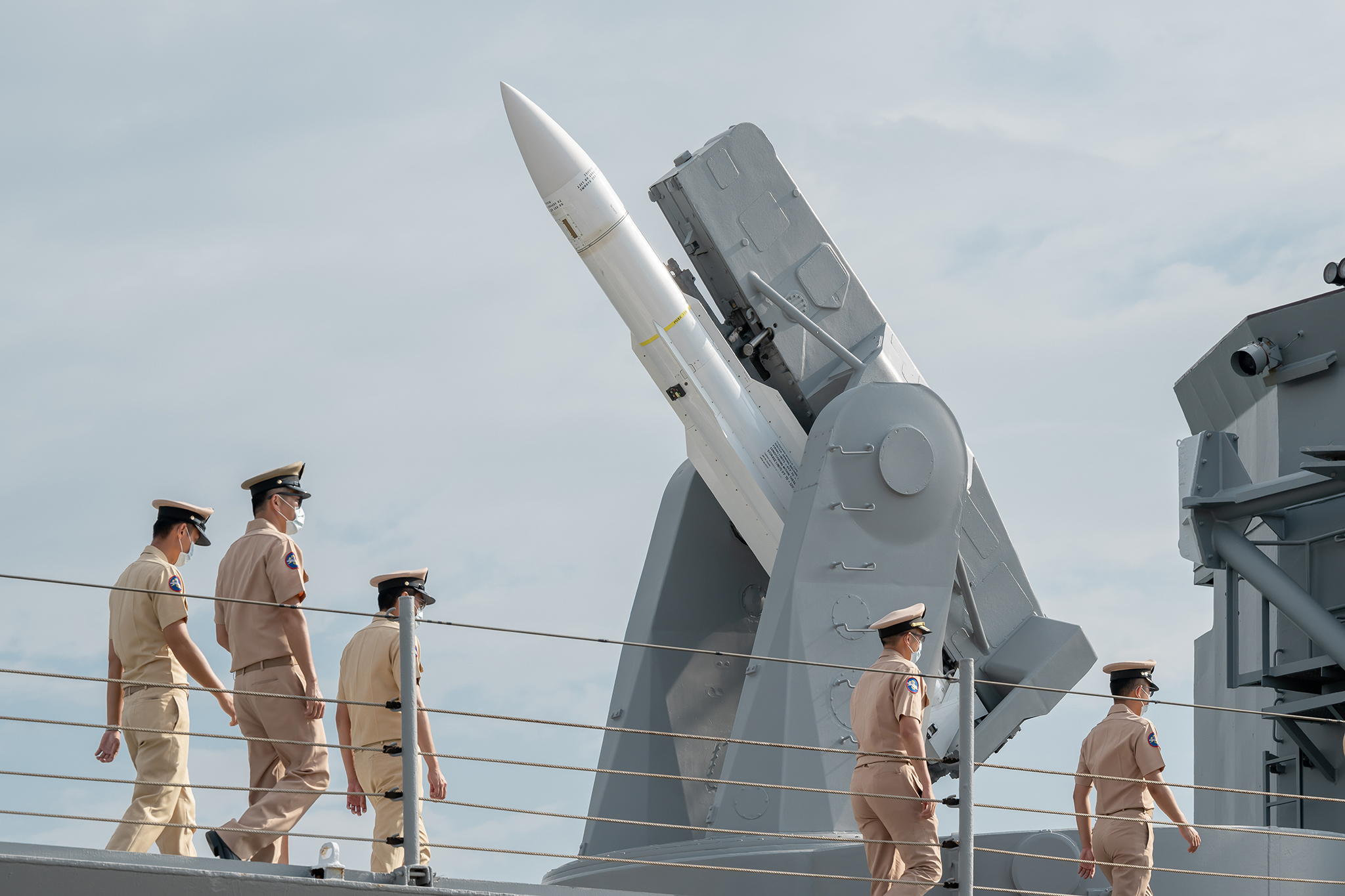
RIM-66 Standard on a Mark 13 missile launcher

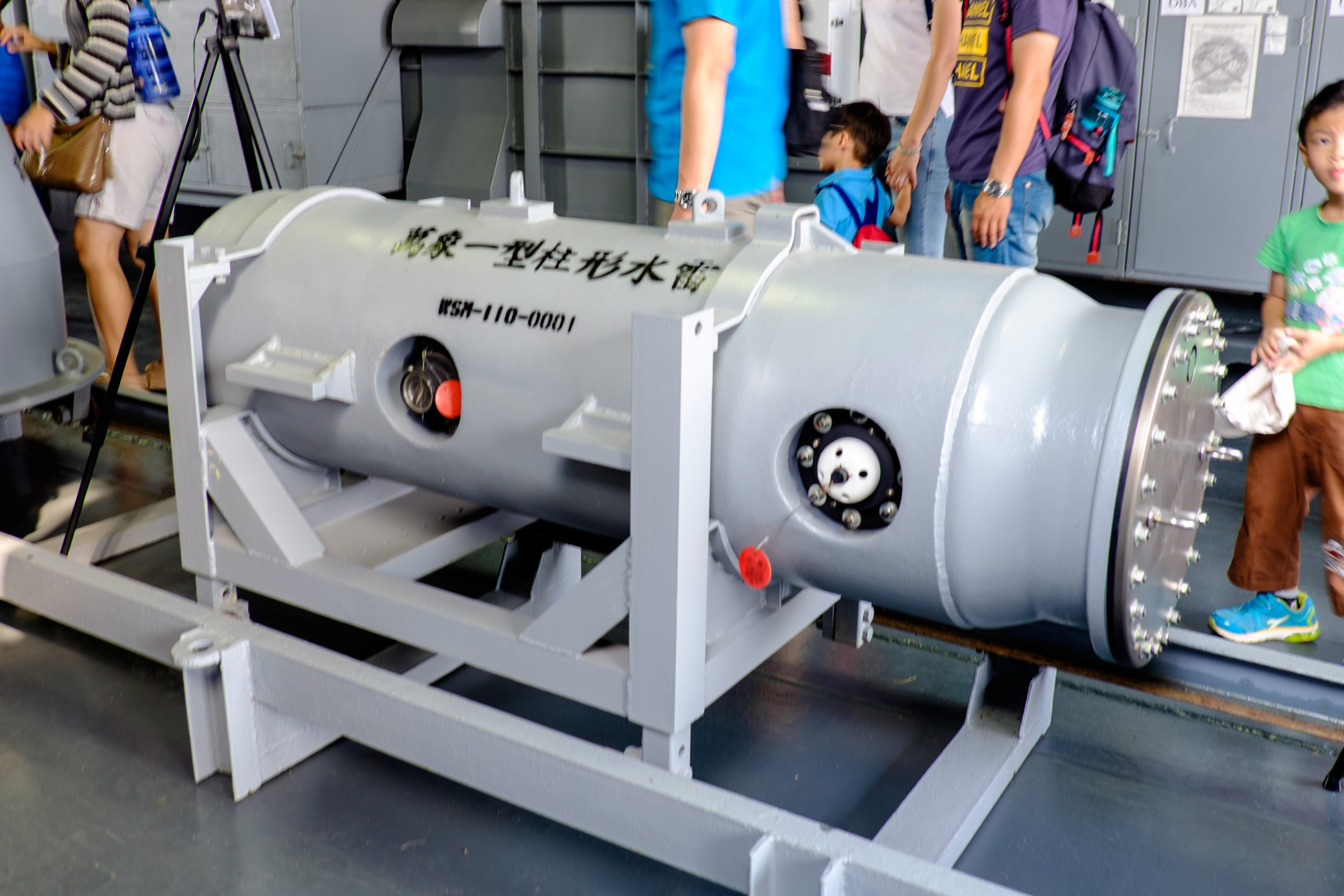
No.1 Wan Xiang CAPTOR Mine

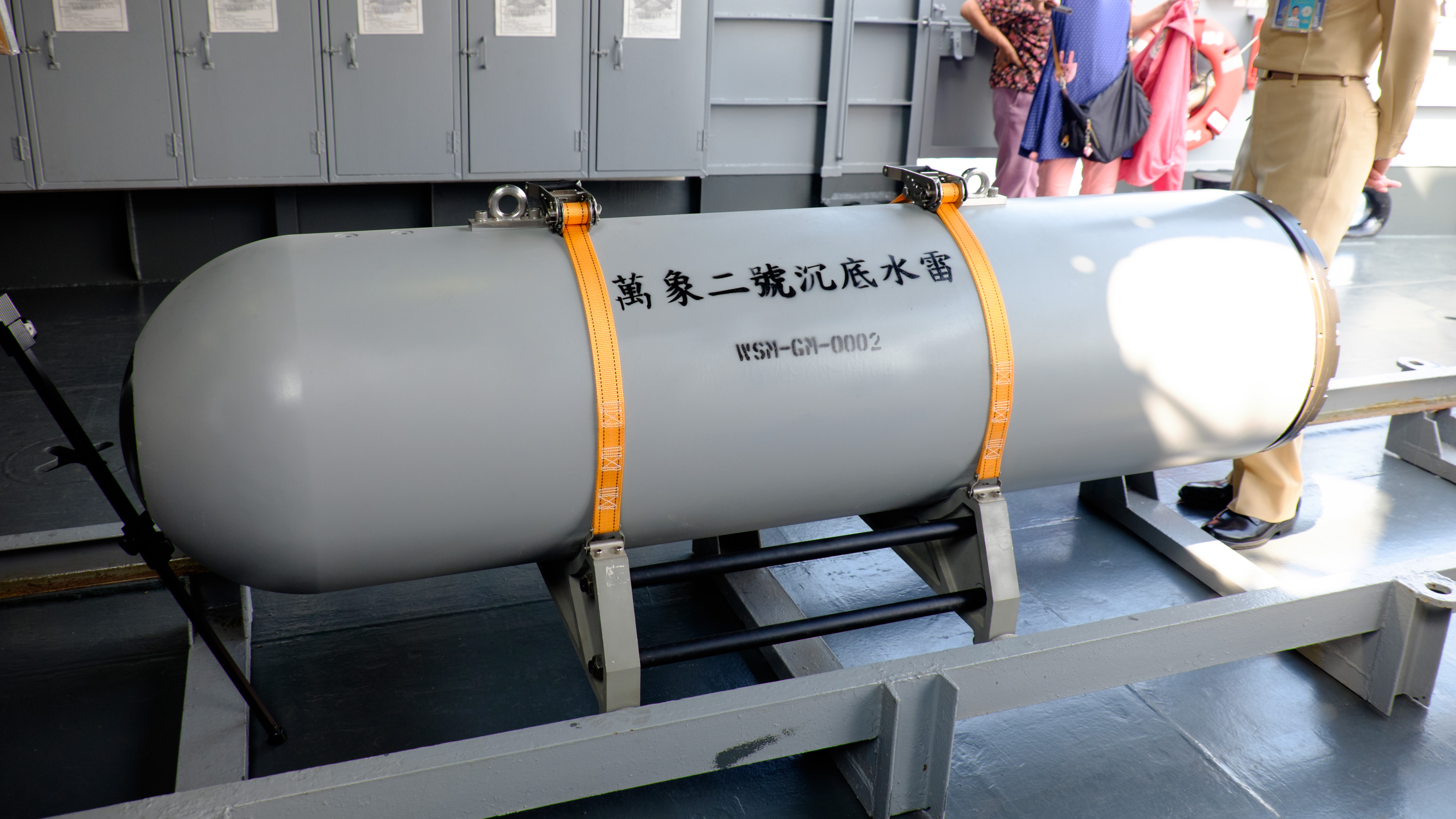
No.2 Wan Xiang Bottom Mine

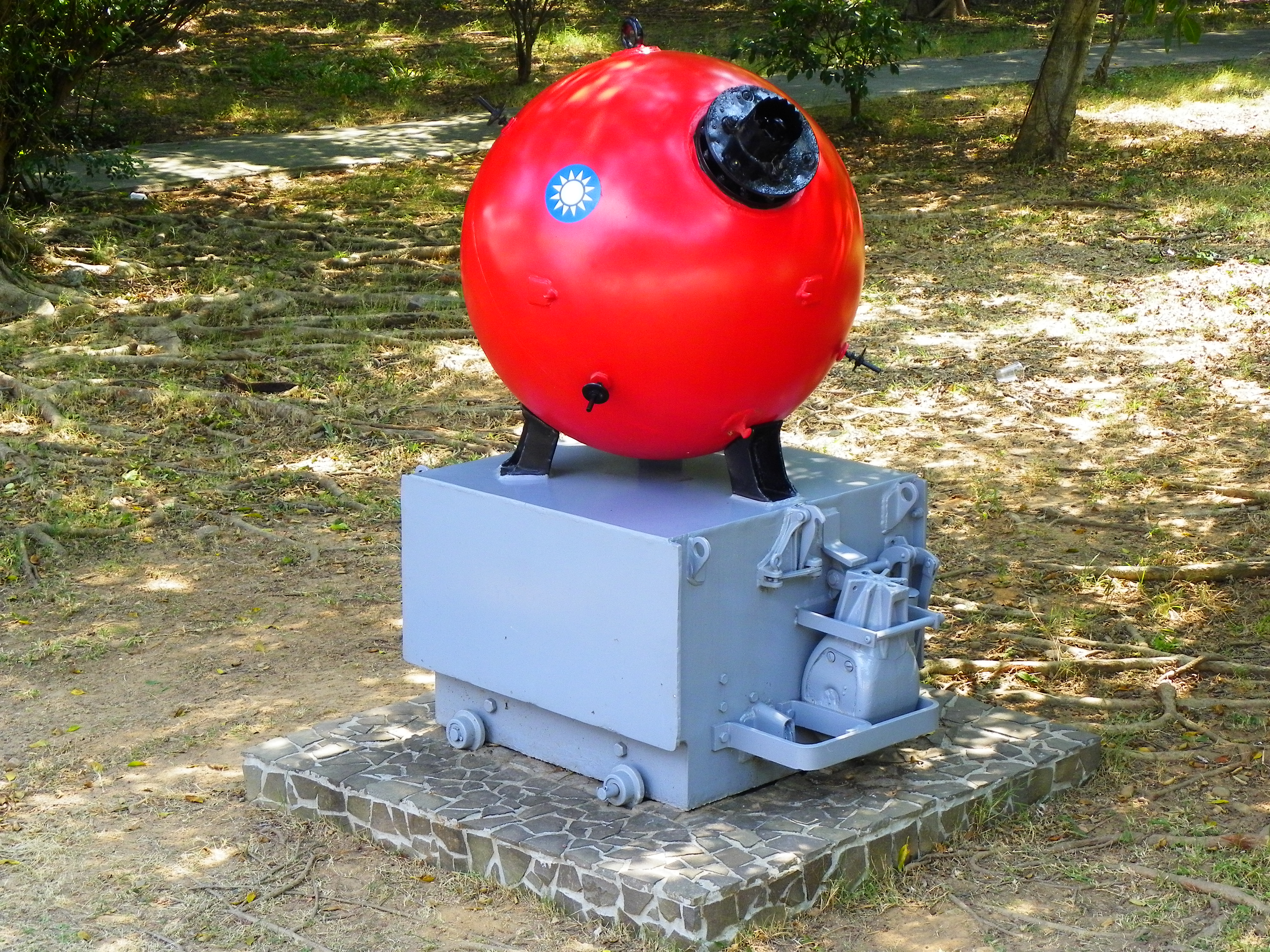
MK.6 Mine

=== Retired ===
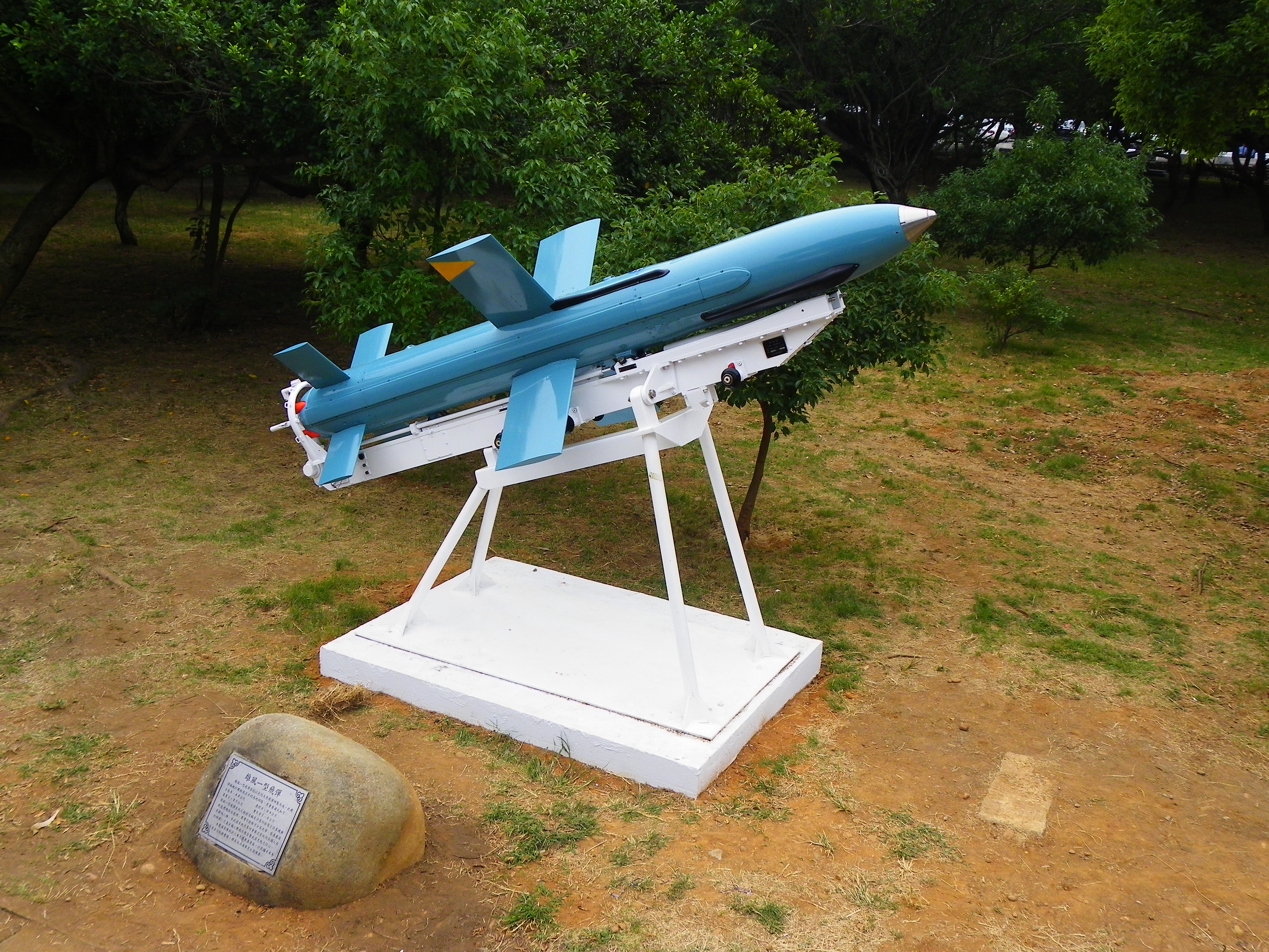
Hsiung Feng I Anti-ship Missile

== See also ==
- NCSIST Kuai Chi
- Hui Long-class UUV
