= USS LST-557 =

LST-542-class tank landing ship of the United States Navy

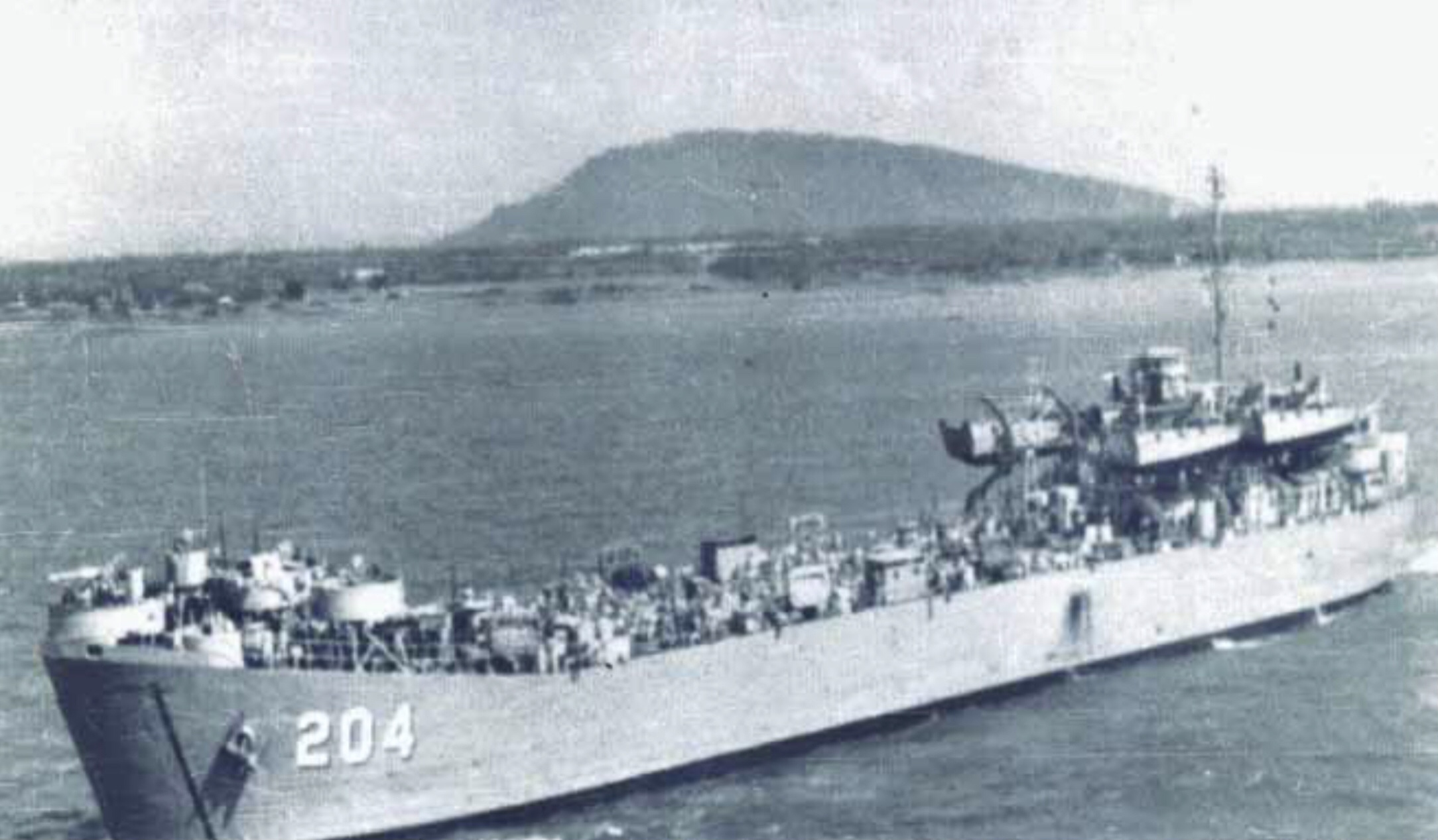
- ROCS Chung Hsing

History

United States
- Name: LST-557
- Builder: Missouri Valley Bridge and Iron Company, Evansville
- Laid down: 8 February 1944
- Launched: 11 April 1944
- Sponsored by: Mrs. Edward J. Baechle
- Commissioned: 5 May 1944
- Decommissioned: 29 May 1946
- Stricken: 12 March 1948
- Identification: Callsign: NEUP
- Honors and awards: See Awards
- Fate: Transferred to Republic of China, 29 May 1946

History

Taiwan
- Name: Chung Hsing; (中興)
- Acquired: 29 May 1946
- Commissioned: 29 May 1946
- Decommissioned: 10 October 1997
- Reclassified: LST-684, 1965; LST-204, October 1968
- Identification: Hull number: LST-204

General characteristics
- Class & type: LST-542-class tank landing ship
- Displacement: 1,625 long tons (1,651 t) light; 4,080 long tons (4,145 t) full (seagoing draft with 1,675-ton load
- Length: 328 ft (100 m)
- Beam: 50 ft (15 m)
- Draft: Unloaded 2 ft 4 in (0.71 m) forward; 7 ft 6 in (2.29 m) aft; Full load: 8 ft 2 in (2.49 m) forward; 14 ft 1 in (4.29 m) aft; Landing with 500-ton load: 3 ft 11 in (1.19 m) forward; 9 ft 10 in (3.00 m) aft
- Installed power: 1,800 horsepower (1.34 megawatts)
- Propulsion: Two 900-horsepower (0.67-megawatt) General Motors 12-567 diesel engines, two shafts, twin rudders
- Speed: 12 knots (22 km/h; 14 mph)
- Range: 24,000 nautical miles (44,448 kilometerss) at 9 knots while displacing 3,960 tons
- Boats & landing craft carried: 6 x LCVPs in U.S. service; 4 x LCVPs in Republic of China service
- Capacity: 1,600-1,900 tons cargo depending on mission
- Troops: 14 officers, 131 enlisted men
- Complement: 9 officers, 120 enlisted men
- Armament: 2 × twin 40 mm gun mounts; 4 × single 40-millimeter gun mounts; 12 × 20 mm guns

USS LST-557 was a United States Navy LST-542-class tank landing ship in commission from 1944 to 1946.

== Construction and career ==
LST-557 was laid down on 8 February 1944 at Evansville, Indiana, by the Missouri Valley Bridge and Iron Company. She was launched on 11 April 1944, sponsored by Mrs. Edward J. Baechle, and commissioned on 5 May 1944.

=== Service in the United States Navy ===
During World War II, LST-557 was assigned to the Pacific Theater of Operations. She participated in the capture and occupation of the southern Palau Islands in September and October 1944. She then took part in the Philippines campaign, participating in the Leyte landings in October and November 1944 and the invasion of Lingayen Gulf in January 1945. She then participated in the assault on and occupation of Okinawa Gunto in April 1945.

Following the war, LST-557 performed occupation duty in the Far East and saw service in China until late May 1946.

LST-557 was decommissioned and transferred to the Republic of China as lend-lease on 29 May 1946. She was stricken from the Navy List on 12 March 1948.

=== Service in the Republic of China Navy ===
In the Republic of China Navy she served as ROCS Chung Hsing (LST-204) on 29 May 1946. She was handed over in Qingdao in the name of Sino-US aid. After receiving the ship she was immediately commissioned.

In the Battle of Nanri Island in October 1952, the ship was responsible for loading assault troops and supporting assault missions. The mission was successfully completed and brilliant results were achieved.

In 1965, the ship was renumbered to LST-684.

She was re-numbered back to LST-204 in October 1968. It was subordinate to the First Fleet Landing of the Navy.

In October 1974, she was reorganized and subordinated to the 151st Fleet of the Navy. The landing of executive personnel and vehicles, and other tasks such as transportation and replenishment of outer islands.

The ship was ordered to be decommissioned on 10 October 1997, due to her outdated equipment.

== Awards ==
LST-557 earned four battle stars for her World War II service.
