= USS LST-640 =

LST-542-class landing ship tank

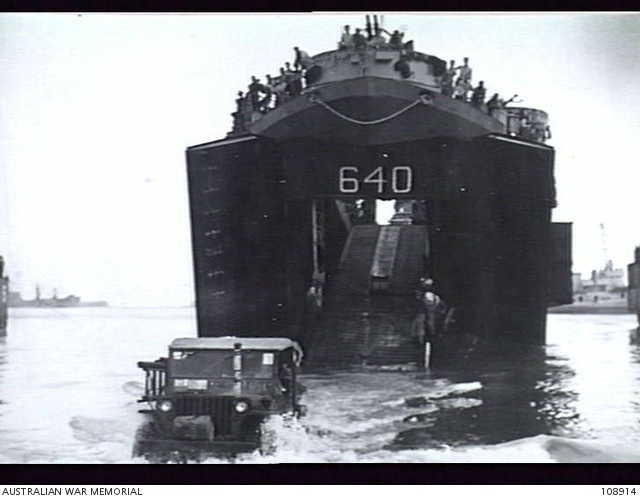
- USS LST-640 on 10 June 1945

History

United States
- Name: LST-640
- Builder: Chicago Bridge and Iron Co., Seneca
- Laid down: 27 May 1944
- Launched: 31 August 1944
- Sponsored by: Mrs. Mary Frances Fox
- Commissioned: 18 September 1944
- Decommissioned: 30 April 1946
- Stricken: 19 July 1946
- Identification: Callsign: NFHT
- Honors and awards: See Awards
- Fate: Sold for commercial use

Taiwan
- Name: Chung Chuan; (中權)
- Acquired: September 1954
- Commissioned: September 1954
- Renamed: from Wan You
- Identification: Hull number: LST-202
- Fate: Destroyed, 10 January 1955

General characteristics
- Class & type: LST-542-class tank landing ship
- Displacement: 1,625 long tons (1,651 t) light; 4,080 long tons (4,145 t) full
- Length: 328 ft (100 m)
- Beam: 50 ft (15 m)
- Draft: Unloaded : 2 ft 4 in (0.71 m) forward; 7 ft 6 in (2.29 m) aft; Loaded : 8 ft 2 in (2.49 m) forward; 14 ft 1 in (4.29 m) aft
- Propulsion: 2 × General Motors 12-567 diesel engines, two shafts, twin rudders
- Speed: 12 knots (22 km/h; 14 mph)
- Boats & landing craft carried: 2 × LCVPs
- Troops: 16 officers, 147 enlisted men
- Complement: 7 officers, 104 enlisted men
- Armament: 8 × 40 mm guns; 12 × 20 mm guns

USS LST-640 was a LST-542-class tank landing ship in the United States Navy during World War II. She was transferred to the Republic of China Navy as ROCS Chung Chuan (LST-202).

== Construction and commissioning ==
LST-640 was laid down on 27 May 1944 at American Bridge Company, Ambridge, Pennsylvania. Launched on 31 August 1944 and commissioned on 18 September 1944.

=== Service in United States Navy ===
During World War II, LST-640 was assigned to the Asiatic-Pacific theater. She then participated in the Palawan Island landings from 1 to 2 March 1945 and Visayan Island landings from 25 to 28 March and 2 to 4 and 7 April 1945. After the war, she was transferred to China for occupation service in April 1946 until her decommissioning.

She was decommissioned on 30 April 1946 and struck from the Naval Register, 19 July 1946. She was sold for commercial use named Wan You.

=== Service in Republic of China Navy ===
She was acquired and commissioned into the Republic of China Navy in September 1954 and renamed Chung Chuan (LST-202). The ship used the number LST-202 to deceive the enemy by swapping name and pennant number with another LST, Heng Shan (ARL-335), thus making Heng Shan the original ship to be named Chung Chuan.

At the beginning of 1955, the Communist Army strengthened its threats against Dachen, except for the capture of Yijiangshan Island, and a large-scale air raid on Dachen. At that time, Chung Chuan, which was carrying oil to the front line, was bombed on the beach by aircraft and burned after an explosion. As for the old ROCS Chung Chuan, which has been renamed Heng Shan, she was hit three times, but did not sink. The second Chung Chuan sank after four months of service, and the two ships alongside Chung Chuan were also attacked together at the time, causing confusion among many people.

However, due to the loss of Chung Chuan (LST-202), Tai Ping (DE-22), and Ling Jiang (PC-103) in the battle of Dachen, the sum of the ship numbers is four, and the navy has since been unwritten. The rule is that the hull numbers cannot add up to 4. Therefore, when Heng Shan was changed back to her original name and pennant number, the ship number LST-202 was no longer used, and LST-221 was used instead.

== Awards ==
LST-640 have earned the following awards:

- China Service Medal (extended)
- American Campaign Medal
- Asiatic-Pacific Campaign Medal (1 battle star)
- World War II Victory Medal
- Philippine Presidential Unit Citation
- Philippine Liberation Medal (1 battle star)

== Sources ==
- United States. Dept. of the Treasury (1962). Treasury Decisions Under the Customs, Internal Revenue, Industrial Alcohol, Narcotic and Other Laws, Volume 97. U.S. Government Printing Office.
- Moore, Capt. John (1984). Jane's Fighting Ships 1984-85. Jane's Information Group. ISBN 978-0710607959.
- Saunders, Stephen (2009). Jane's Fighting Ships 2009-2010. Jane's Information Group. ISBN 978-0710628886.
- Fairplay International Shipping Journal Volume 222. United Kingdom: Fairplay Publishing Limited. 1967.
