= USS LST-1075 =

1945 LST-542-class tank landing ship

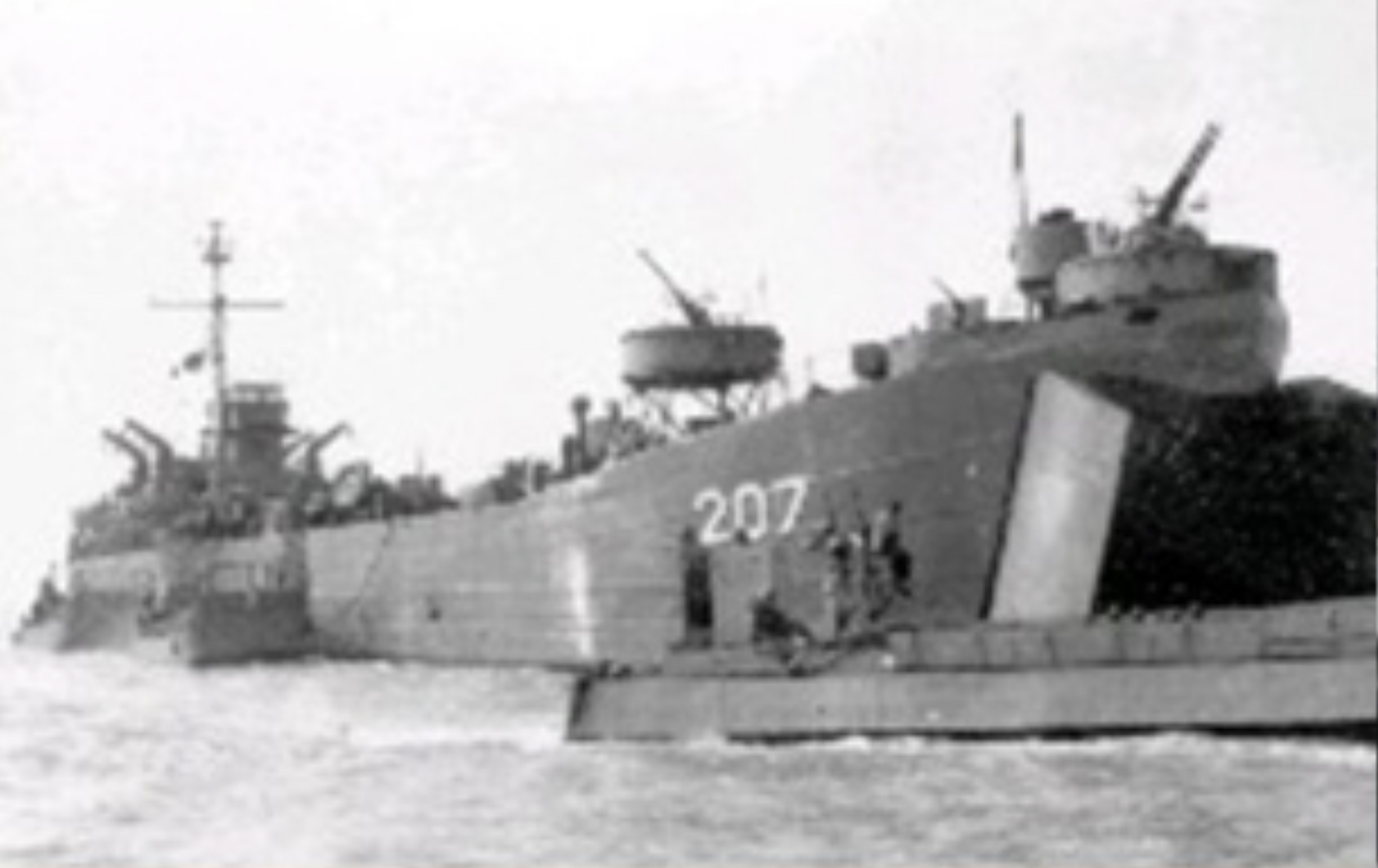
- ROCS Chung Cheng on 8 February 1955

History

United States
- Name: LST-1075
- Builder: Bethlehem-Hingham Shipyard, Hingham, Massachusetts
- Yard number: 3465
- Laid down: 5 March 1945
- Launched: 3 April 1945
- Commissioned: 25 April 1945
- Decommissioned: 8 December 1946
- Stricken: 12 March 1948
- Identification: Code letters: NAIX; Hull number: LST-1075
- Fate: Transferred to the Republic of China, 8 December 1946

Republic of China
- Name: Chung Cheng; (中程)
- Acquired: 29 May 1946
- Commissioned: 8 December 1946
- Decommissioned: 1 November 1957
- Identification: Hull number: LST-207
- Fate: Scrapped

General characteristics
- Class & type: LST-542-class tank landing ship
- Displacement: 1,625 long tons (1,651 t) (light); 4,080 long tons (4,145 t) (full (seagoing draft with 1,675 short tons (1,520 t) load); 2,366 long tons (2,404 t) (beaching)
- Length: 328 ft (100 m) oa
- Beam: 50 ft (15 m)
- Draft: Unloaded: 2 ft 4 in (0.71 m) forward; 7 ft 6 in (2.29 m) aft; Full load: 8 ft 3 in (2.51 m) forward; 14 ft 1 in (4.29 m) aft; Landing with 500 short tons (450 t) load: 3 ft 11 in (1.19 m) forward; 9 ft 10 in (3.00 m) aft; Limiting 11 ft 2 in (3.40 m); Maximum navigation 14 ft 1 in (4.29 m)
- Installed power: 2 × 900 hp (670 kW) Electro-Motive Diesel 12-567A diesel engines; 1,800 shp (1,300 kW)
- Propulsion: 1 × Falk main reduction gears; 2 × Propellers
- Speed: 11.6 kn (21.5 km/h; 13.3 mph)
- Range: 24,000 nmi (44,000 km; 28,000 mi) at 9 kn (17 km/h; 10 mph) while displacing 3,960 long tons (4,024 t)
- Boats & landing craft carried: 2 x LCVPs
- Capacity: 1,600–1,900 short tons (3,200,000–3,800,000 lb; 1,500,000–1,700,000 kg) cargo depending on mission
- Troops: 16 officers, 147 enlisted men
- Complement: 13 officers, 104 enlisted men
- Armament: Varied, ultimate armament; 2 × twin 40 mm (1.57 in) Bofors guns; 4 × single 40 mm Bofors guns; 12 × 20 mm (0.79 in) Oerlikon cannons

Service record
- Part of: LST Flotilla 34
- Awards: China Service Medal; American Campaign Medal; Asiatic–Pacific Campaign Medal; World War II Victory Medal; Navy Occupation Service Medal w/Asia Clasp

USS LST-1075 was an LST-542-class tank landing ship in the United States Navy. Like many of her class, she was not named and is properly referred to by her hull designation.

== Construction and career ==
LST-1075 was laid down on 5 March 1945, at Hingham, Massachusetts, by the Bethlehem-Hingham Shipyard; launched on 3 April 1945; and commissioned on 25 April 1945.

=== Service in the United States Navy ===
Following World War II, LST-1075 performed occupation duty in the Far East and saw service in China until mid-December 1946. She was decommissioned and transferred to the Republic of China Navy on 18 December 1946. The ship was struck from the Navy list on 12 March 1948.

=== Service in the Republic of China Navy ===
She was commissioned into the navy on 8 December 1946.

She took part in the Battle of Dachen Archipelago which lasted from January to February 1955.

In 1957, she ran aground off Pingtung and later decommissioned on 1 November 1957. The ship was deemed unrepairable and scrapped. Her name was later taken over by LST-224.

== Bibliography ==
Online resources

- "LST-1075". Dictionary of American Naval Fighting Ships. Naval History and Heritage Command. This article incorporates text from this source, which is in the public domain.
- "Bethlehem-Hingham, Hingham MA". www.ShipbuildingHistory.com. 11 August 2011.
- "USS LST-1075". NavSource. 23 September 2016.
