= Patrol Ship Multi-Mission =

Military gunboat class

Class overview
- Name: PSMM Mk5 Multi Mission Patrol Ship
- Builders: Tacoma Boatbuilding Company, Korea Tacoma Marine Industries Ltd., Taiwan's China Shipbuilding Co.
- Preceded by: Asheville class gunboat

General characteristics
- Type: PSMM Patrol Ship Multi Mission
- Displacement: 240 tons
- Length: 50.14 m (164.5ft)
- Beam: 7.26 m (23.82ft)
- Draft: 3.05 m (10.0ft)
- Propulsion: Combined diesel or gas (CODOG) System; Lycoming TF-40A model gas turbine (15000 hp); GM 12V149 TI-type diesel engine (5400 hp)
- Speed: 38 knots maximum on turbine
- Range: 5000 km on diesel
- Complement: Six officers, 32 enlisted
- Sensors & processing systems: Honeywell/Hughes H-930 (Mk 93)Mod2. Combat System
- Armament: Missiles: 4 × Hsiung Feng anti-ship missile/ Exocet MM-38 SSM; Guns: 1 × 76 mm cannon; 1 × Bofors 40 mm/70 Mk 10

The PSMM Mk5 multi-purpose patrol boat class gunboat were a class of small military ships built for the United States Navy based on the Asheville class gunboat. The class is called Patrol Ship Multi Mission. The class was used by South Korean, Indonesia, Taiwan and Thailand Navies.

PSMM Mk5 multi-purpose patrol boat class gunboats employed a Combined diesel or gas turbine (CODOG) propulsion system; twin GM 12V149 Diesels for endurance, and a Lycoming TF-40A gas turbine for high-speed dash.

== Ships ==
=== Republic of Korea Navy ===
- PGM-351 Paek Ku 51
- PGM 581 Paek Ku 52 delivered 14-Mar-75
- PGM 582 Paek Ku 53 delivered 14-Mar-75
- PGM 584 Paek Ku 55 delivered 1-Feb-76
- PGM 585 Paek Ku 56 delivered 1-Feb-76
- PGM 586 - built in South Korea
- PGM 587 - built in South Korea
- PGM 589 - built in South Korea
- PGM 591 - built in South Korea

=== Republic of China Navy ===
- Lung Chiang PGG 601 delivered 15-May-78
- Suijiang PGG 602 built in Taiwan

=== Republic of Indonesia Navy ===
Mandau class missile FAC made in South Korea by Korea-Tacoma in Masan with Exocet MM-38

Displacement: 270 tons full load
Dimensions: 50.2 x 7.3 x 2.3 meters (164.6 x 23.9 x 7.5 feet)
Propulsion: 2 shafts; 2 MTU 12V diesel engine, 2,240 bhp; 1 LM 2500 gas turbine, 25,000 shp, 35 knots
Crew: 43
Radar: Racal Decca 1226
Fire Control: Signaal WM-28, Selenia NA-18
EW: Thompson-CSF DR-2000S Mk1 intercept
Armament: 4 MM38 Exocet SSM, 1 57mm/70cal DP, 1 Bofors 40 mm, 2 Rheinmettal 20 mm

Name	Number	Year
KRI Mandau	621	1979
KRI Rencong	622	1979
KRI Badik	623	1980
KRI Keris	624	1980

=== Kingdom of Thailand Navy ===
Sattahip class built in Thailand

Displacement: 300 tons full load
Dimensions: 50.14 x 7.30 x 1.58 meters (164.5 x 24 × 5 feet)
Propulsion: 2 diesels, 2 shafts, 6,840 bhp, 22 knots
Crew: 56
Armament: 1 76/50 SP (76 mm OTO DP in 521–523), 1 40 mm, 2 20 mm, 2 12.7 mm MG

Number	Name	Year
PC 521	Sattahip	1983
PC 522	Klongyai	1984
PC 523	Takbai	1984
PC 524	Katang	1985
PC 525	Thepa	1986
PC 526	Thai Muang	1986

== Bibliography ==
- Smigielski, Adam (1995). "Thailand". In Chumbley, Stephen (ed.). Conway's All The World's Fighting Ships 1947–1995. Annapolis, Maryland: Naval Institute Press. pp. 460–466. ISBN 1-55750-132-7.
