= USS LST-1017 =

LST-542-class landing ship tank

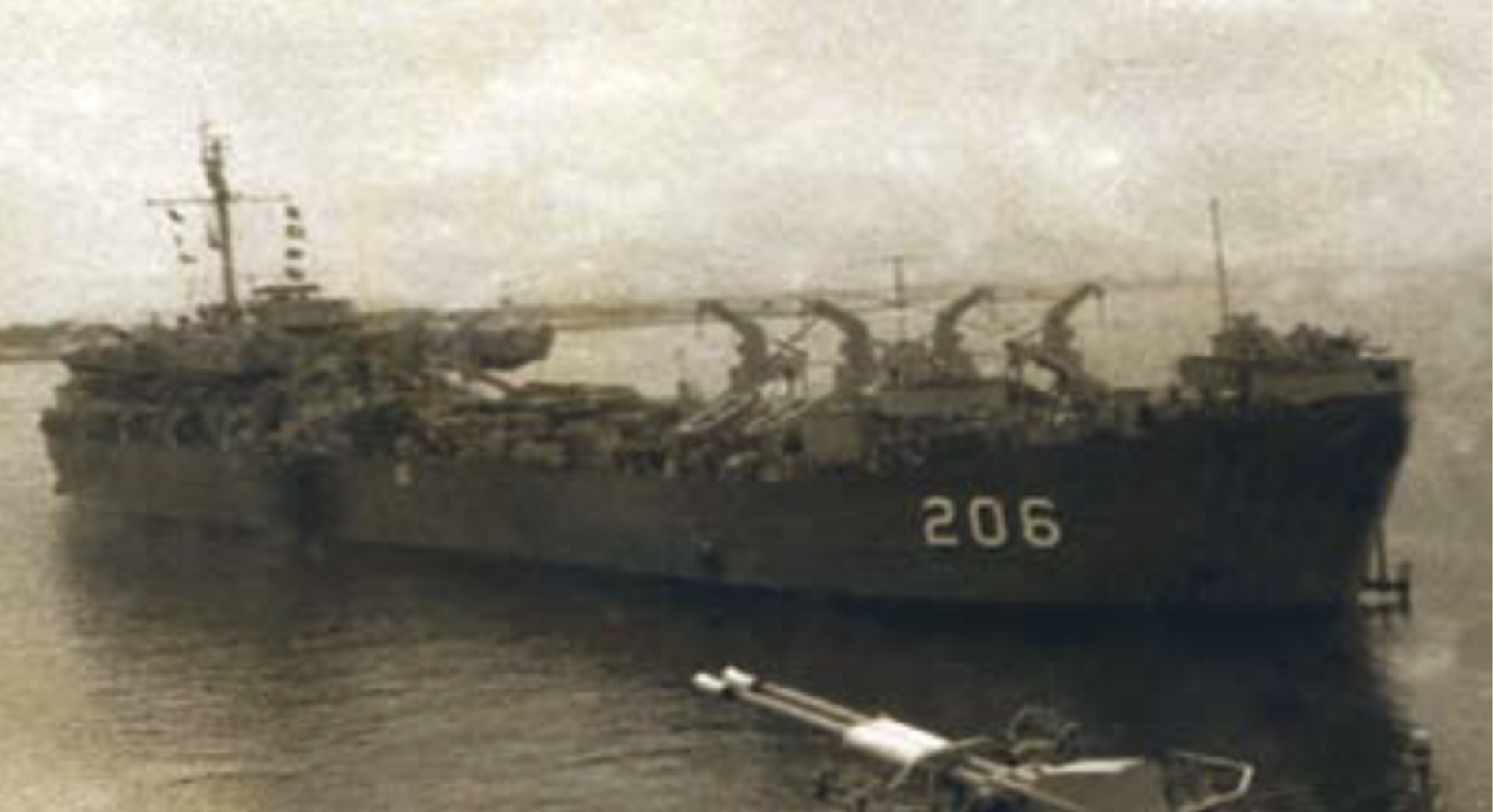
- ROCS Chung Chi

History

United States
- Name: LST-1017
- Builder: Bethlehem Steel Co., Quincy
- Laid down: 25 March 1944
- Launched: 25 April 1944
- Commissioned: 12 May 1944
- Decommissioned: 29 June 1946
- Stricken: 12 March 1948
- Identification: Callsign: NVPT
- Fate: Transferred to Republic of China, 1946

Taiwan
- Name: Chung Chi; (中基)
- Acquired: 14 December 1946
- Commissioned: 14 December 1946
- Decommissioned: 1 September 1990
- Identification: Hull number: LST-206
- Status: Decommissioned

General characteristics
- Class & type: LST-542-class tank landing ship
- Displacement: 1,625 long tons (1,651 t) light; 4,080 long tons (4,145 t) full
- Length: 328 ft (100 m)
- Beam: 50 ft (15 m)
- Draft: Unloaded : 2 ft 4 in (0.71 m) forward; 7 ft 6 in (2.29 m) aft; Loaded : 8 ft 2 in (2.49 m) forward; 14 ft 1 in (4.29 m) aft
- Propulsion: 2 × General Motors 12-567 diesel engines, two shafts, twin rudders
- Speed: 12 knots (22 km/h; 14 mph)
- Boats & landing craft carried: 2 × LCVPs
- Troops: 16 officers, 147 enlisted men
- Complement: 7 officers, 104 enlisted men
- Armament: 8 × 40 mm guns; 12 × 20 mm guns

USS LST-1017 was a LST-542-class tank landing ship in the United States Navy during World War II. She was transferred to the Republic of China Navy as ROCS Chung Chi (LST-206).

== Construction and commissioning ==
LST-1017 was laid down on 25 March 1944 at Bethlehem Steel Company, Quincy, Massachusetts. Launched on 25 April 1944 and commissioned on 12 May 1944.

=== Service in United States Navy ===
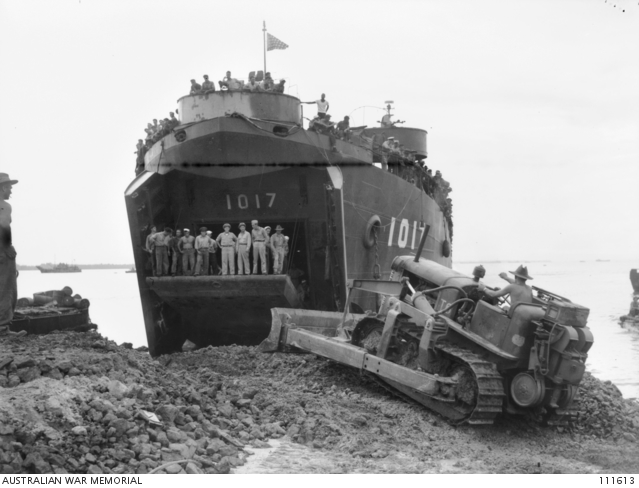
LST-1017 on 19 June 1945

During World War II, LST-1017 was assigned to the Asiatic-Pacific theater. She then participated in the Morotai landings on 15 September 1944 and Leyte landings from 5 to 18 November 1944. In 1945, she took part in the Lingayen Gulf landing from 4 to 17 January, the Mindanao Island landing from 17 to 23 April, Transporting Australian Troops ex Cairns (Queensland) on 27 May, disembarked Morotai 13 June 1945 and Balikpapan operation from 26 June to 9 July. She was assigned to occupation and China from 20 October 1945 to 29 June 1946.

She was decommissioned on 29 June 1946 and struck from the Naval Register, 12 March 1948 after she was transferred to the Republic of China on 14 December 1946.

=== Service in Republic of China Navy ===
Chung Chi was decommissioned on 1 September 1990.

== Awards ==
LST-1017 have earned the following awards:

- China Service Medal (extended)
- American Campaign Medal
- Asiatic-Pacific Campaign Medal (5 battle stars)
- World War II Victory Medal
- Navy Occupation Service Medal (with Asia clasp)
- Philippines Presidential Unit Citation
- Philippines Liberation Medal (2 battle stars)

== Sources ==
- United States. Dept. of the Treasury (1962). Treasury Decisions Under the Customs, Internal Revenue, Industrial Alcohol, Narcotic and Other Laws, Volume 97. U.S. Government Printing Office.
- Moore, Capt. John (1984). Jane's Fighting Ships 1984-85. Jane's Information Group. ISBN 978-0710607959.
- Saunders, Stephen (2009). Jane's Fighting Ships 2009-2010. Jane's Information Group. ISBN 978-0710628886.
- Fairplay International Shipping Journal Volume 222. United Kingdom: Fairplay Publishing Limited. 1967.
