= USS Susanville =

Patrol vessel of the United States Navy

History

United States
- Namesake: Susanville, California
- Ordered: As PC-1149
- Builder: Defoe Shipbuilding Company
- Laid down: 6 November 1943
- Launched: 11 January 1944
- Commissioned: 22 June 1944
- Decommissioned: 20 February 1947
- Fate: Transferred to Taiwan, 16 July 1957

General characteristics
- Class & type: PC-461
- Displacement: 280 Tons
- Length: 173 ft 8 in (52.93 m)
- Beam: 23 ft 0 in (7.01 m)
- Draft: 10 ft 10 in (3.30 m)
- Speed: 22 knots
- Complement: 65
- Armament: 1 × 3 in (76 mm)/50 cal; 1 × 40 mm gun

USS Susanville (PC-1149) was a patrol boat in the service of the United States Navy during World War II.

She was laid down as PC-1149 on 6 November 1943 at the Defoe Shipbuilding Company in Bay City, Michigan; launched on 11 January 1944; and commissioned on 22 June 1944.

She sailed, via the Mississippi River and New Orleans, Louisiana, to the Gulf of Mexico and conducted shakedown training out of Miami, Florida. During her first year of service, PC-1149 cruised the waters along the east coast of the United States and in the Caribbean Sea. She patrolled for German U-boats and escorted coastal and Caribbean convoys from port to port. The submarine chaser ranged as far north as New York City and as far south as Guantanamo Bay, Cuba.

On 13 June 1945, about a week before the first anniversary of her active service, she transited the Panama Canal and joined the Pacific Fleet. After stopping at San Diego, California, and at Pearl Harbor, she arrived at Eniwetok in the Central Pacific on 28 July; then sailed the following day for the Marianas. She reached Saipan on 1 August and remained there through the end of the war and into September. After a brief voyage to Iwo Jima early that month, PC-1149 returned to the Marianas and operated in that island group for a little more than a year. In November 1946, she returned, via Kwajalein and Pearl Harbor, to the United States, arriving at the Columbia River Reserve Fleet berthing area in Oregon in mid-December. On 20 February 1947, PC-1149 was placed out of commission and berthed at Columbia River.

On 15 February 1956, while still out of commission, she was named Susanville, after a town in Lassen County in northeastern California. Sixteen months later, on 16 July 1957, Susanville was transferred, on loan, to the Nationalist Chinese Navy and was commissioned as Hsi Kiang. She served the Taiwan Navy until 30 June 1972 when she was transferred to the Taiwan Customs Service.
