= USS LST-520 =

LST-491-class landing ship tank

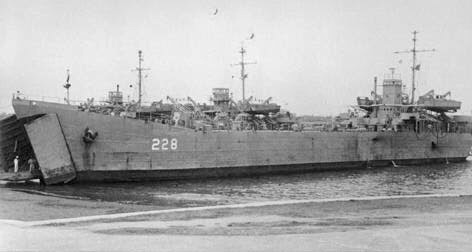
- ROCS Chung Shu

History

United States
- Name: LST-520
- Builder: Chicago Bridge and Iron Co., Seneca
- Laid down: 24 September 1943
- Launched: 31 January 1944
- Sponsored by: Mrs. Jane G. Gongaware
- Commissioned: 28 February 1944
- Decommissioned: 13 January 1946
- Reclassified: Q013, 13 January 1946; T-LST-520, 31 March 1952
- Stricken: 1 October 1958
- Identification: Callsign: NDZD
- Honors and awards: See Awards
- Fate: Transferred to Republic of China, 1 October 1958

Taiwan
- Name: Chung Shu; (中肅)
- Acquired: 1 October 1958
- Commissioned: 16 September 1958
- Decommissioned: 16 December 1990
- Identification: Hull number: LST-228

General characteristics
- Class & type: LST-491-class tank landing ship
- Displacement: 1,625 long tons (1,651 t) (light); 4,080 long tons (4,145 t) (full (seagoing draft with 1,675 short tons (1,520 t) load); 2,366 long tons (2,404 t) (beaching)
- Length: 328 ft (100 m) oa
- Beam: 50 ft (15 m)
- Draft: Unloaded: 2 ft 4 in (0.71 m) forward; 7 ft 6 in (2.29 m) aft; Full load: 8 ft 3 in (2.51 m) forward; 14 ft 1 in (4.29 m) aft; Landing with 500 short tons (450 t) load: 3 ft 11 in (1.19 m) forward; 9 ft 10 in (3.00 m) aft
- Installed power: 2 × 900 hp (670 kW) Electro-Motive Diesel 12-567A diesel engines; 1,700 shp (1,300 kW)
- Propulsion: 1 × Falk main reduction gears; 2 × Propellers
- Speed: 12 kn (22 km/h; 14 mph)
- Range: 24,000 nmi (44,000 km; 28,000 mi) at 9 kn (17 km/h; 10 mph) while displacing 3,960 long tons (4,024 t)
- Boats & landing craft carried: 6 x LCVPs
- Capacity: 1,600–1,900 short tons (3,200,000–3,800,000 lb; 1,500,000–1,700,000 kg) cargo depending on mission
- Troops: 16 officers, 147 enlisted men
- Complement: 13 officers, 104 enlisted men
- Armament: Varied, ultimate armament; 2 × twin 40 mm (1.57 in) Bofors guns; 4 × single 40 mm Bofors guns; 12 × 20 mm (0.79 in) Oerlikon cannons

USS LST-520 was a LST-491-class tank landing ship in the United States Navy during World War II. She was transferred to the Republic of China Navy as ROCS Chung Shu (LST-228).

== Construction and career ==
LST-520 was laid down on 24 September 1943 at Missouri Valley Bridge and Iron Company, Evansville, Indiana. Launched on 31 January 1944 and commissioned on 28 February 1944.

=== Service in the United States Navy ===
During World War II, LST-503 was assigned to the Europe-Africa-Middle theater but later changed Asiatic-Pacific theater. She then participated in the Invasion of Normandy from 6 to 25 June 1944.

She participated in the invasion of Okinawa and later took occupation there from 16 May to 30 June 1945. She assigned to Occupation service in the Far East from Occupation 20 September to 3 October 1945, 17 to 28 October 1945, 14 November to 22 December 1945 and 3 to 13 January 1946.

She was decommissioned on 13 January 1946 and came under the Commander Naval Forces Far East (COMNAVFE) Shipping Control Authority for Japan (SCAJAP), redesignated Q013.

Transferred to the Military Sea Transportation Service (MSTS), 31 March 1952, and placed in service as USNS T-LST-520.

LST-520 was struck from the Navy Register on 1 October 1958 and transferred to the Republic of China.

=== Service in the Republic of China Navy ===
She was commissioned into the Republic of China Navy on 16 September 1958 and renamed ROCS Chung Shu (LST-228) and was subordinate to the Deng Er Fleet Department (136 Fleet Department).

In January 1959, weapons were installed at the Hai No. 1 Plant, and in January 1967, the Xinzhong No. 1 modernization was implemented at the Keelung Taiwan Shipyard and the refit was carried out.

During the naval service period, the ship performed out-of-island transportation, supplementary training, and exercise training. It was able to display mutual assistance, cooperation, and the spirit of unity and struggle, and it was successfully completed.

Due to the gradual decrease in transportation and replenishment tasks, a simple seal was ordered on 16 December 1990.

== Awards ==
LST-520 have earned the following awards:

- American Campaign Medal
- European-Africa-Middle East Campaign Medal (1 battle star)
- Asiatic-Pacific Campaign Medal (1 battle star)
- Navy Occupation Medal (with Asia clasp)
- World War II Victory Medal

== Sources ==
- United States. Dept. of the Treasury (1962). Treasury Decisions Under the Customs, Internal Revenue, Industrial Alcohol, Narcotic and Other Laws, Volume 97. U.S. Government Printing Office.
- Moore, Capt. John (1984). Jane's Fighting Ships 1984-85. Jane's Information Group. ISBN 978-0710607959.
- Saunders, Stephen (2009). Jane's Fighting Ships 2009-2010. Jane's Information Group. ISBN 978-0710628886.
- Fairplay International Shipping Journal Volume 222. United Kingdom: Fairplay Publishing Limited. 1967.
