= USS LST-1050 =

LST-542-class landing ship tank

History

United States
- Name: LST-1050
- Builder: Dravo Corporation, Pittsburgh
- Laid down: 23 December 1944
- Launched: 3 March 1945
- Sponsored by: Mrs. Oscar Enigson Jr.
- Commissioned: 3 April 1945
- Decommissioned: 27 January 1947
- Stricken: 12 March 1948
- Identification: Callsign: NAAZ
- Honors and awards: See Awards
- Fate: Transferred to Republic of China, 1946

Taiwan
- Name: Chung Lien; (中練)
- Acquired: 1946
- Commissioned: 1946
- Decommissioned: 1 September 1990
- Identification: Hull number: LST-209
- Status: Decommissioned

General characteristics
- Class & type: LST-542-class tank landing ship
- Displacement: 1,625 long tons (1,651 t) light; 4,080 long tons (4,145 t) full
- Length: 328 ft (100 m)
- Beam: 50 ft (15 m)
- Draft: Unloaded : 2 ft 4 in (0.71 m) forward; 7 ft 6 in (2.29 m) aft; Loaded : 8 ft 2 in (2.49 m) forward; 14 ft 1 in (4.29 m) aft
- Propulsion: 2 × General Motors 12-567 diesel engines, two shafts, twin rudders
- Speed: 12 knots (22 km/h; 14 mph)
- Boats & landing craft carried: 2 × LCVPs
- Troops: 16 officers, 147 enlisted men
- Complement: 7 officers, 104 enlisted men
- Armament: 8 × 40 mm guns; 12 × 20 mm guns

USS LST-1050 was a LST-542-class tank landing ship in the United States Navy during World War II. She was transferred to the Republic of China Navy as ROCS Chung Lien (LST-209).

== Construction and career ==
LST-1050 was laid down on 23 December 1944 at Dravo Corporation, Pittsburgh, Pennsylvania. Launched on 3 March 1945 and commissioned on 3 April 1945.

=== Service in United States Navy ===
During World War II, LST-537 was assigned to the Asiatic-Pacific theater. She was assigned to occupation and China from 25 September 1945 to 27 January 1947.

She was decommissioned on 29 May 1946 and struck from the Naval Register, 12 March 1948 after she was transferred to the Republic of China.

=== Service in Republic of China Navy ===
The ship was commissioned in 1946 with the name Chung Lien (LST-209).

Chung Lien was decommissioned on 1 September 1990.

== Awards ==
LST-1050 have earned the following awards:

- China Service Medal (extended)
- American Campaign Medal
- Asiatic-Pacific Campaign Medal
- World War II Victory Medal
- Navy Occupation Service Medal (with Asia clasp)

== Sources ==
- United States. Dept. of the Treasury (1962). Treasury Decisions Under the Customs, Internal Revenue, Industrial Alcohol, Narcotic and Other Laws, Volume 97. U.S. Government Printing Office.
- Moore, Capt. John (1984). Jane's Fighting Ships 1984-85. Jane's Information Group. ISBN 978-0710607959.
- Saunders, Stephen (2009). Jane's Fighting Ships 2009-2010. Jane's Information Group. ISBN 978-0710628886.
- Fairplay International Shipping Journal Volume 222. United Kingdom: Fairplay Publishing Limited. 1967.
