= USS Gavia =

Minesweeper of the United States Navy

History

United States
- Name: USS PCE-907
- Builder: Willamette Iron and Steel Works, Portland, Oregon
- Laid down: 8 July 1943
- Launched: 18 September 1943
- Sponsored by: Mrs. James E. Ray
- Renamed: USS Gavia (AM-363), 27 September 1943
- Namesake: Gavia
- Commissioned: 23 July 1945
- Decommissioned: 29 May 1946
- Stricken: 19 July 1946
- Fate: Transferred to the Republic of China, 1946

History

Taiwan
- Name: Yung Chun
- Acquired: 1946
- Decommissioned: 1 June 1962
- Stricken: 1 June 1962
- Fate: unknown

General characteristics
- Class & type: PCE-905-class patrol craft
- Class & type: Admirable-class minesweeper, September 1943
- Displacement: 650 long tons (660 t)
- Length: 184 ft 6 in (56.24 m)
- Beam: 33 ft (10 m)
- Draft: 9 ft 9 in (2.97 m)
- Propulsion: 2 × ALCO 539 diesel engines, 1,710 shp (1,280 kW); Farrel-Birmingham single reduction gear; 2 shafts
- Speed: 15 knots (28 km/h)
- Complement: 104
- Armament: 1 × 3"/50 caliber (76 mm) DP gun; 2 × twin Bofors 40 mm guns; 1 × Hedgehog anti-submarine mortar; 2 × Depth charge tracks

Service record
- Part of: U.S. Pacific Fleet (1945–1946); Chinese Maritime Customs Service (1946–1962)
- Awards: 2 Battle stars

USS Gavia (AM-363) was an Admirable-class minesweeper built for the United States Navy during World War II. The ship was ordered and laid down as PCE-905-class patrol craft USS PCE-907 but was renamed and reclassified before her September 1943 launch as Gavia (AM-363). She earned two battle stars in service in the Pacific during World War II. In May 1946, she was turned over to the Republic of China for service with the Chinese Maritime Customs Service as Yung Chun. She was removed from service in June 1962.

== Career ==
Gavia was laid down as PCE-907 on 8 July 1943 by Willamette Iron & Steel Corp., Portland, Oregon, launched 18 September 1943 sponsored by Mrs. James E. Ray; reclassified as AM-363 on 27 September 1943; and commissioned as Gavia (AM-363) 23 July 1945. After trials in the Columbia River Gavia departed Astoria, Oregon, 10 August 1945 for mine warfare exercises at San Pedro and San Diego, California. She departed San Pedro 26 September and reached Honolulu 4 October 1945. After additional minesweeping training in Hawaiian waters, she departed Pearl Harbor 26 October for minesweeping operations in the Far East. Proceeding, via Eniwetok and Saipan she arrived Wakayama, Japan, 27 November.

Steaming to Sasebo 3 December, Gavia spent the remainder of the month sweeping for mines in Tsushima Strait, Okino Shima, Tachabana Wan. She continued minesweeping exercises at Sasebo until 17 February 1946 then sailed for Buckner Bay, Okinawa. After serving as reference ship for Japanese minesweepers clearing waters off Miyako Jima, she arrived Subic Bay 19 March and removed her ordnance gear. She departed 9 April and reached Shanghai 13 April.

She decommissioned there 29 May 1946 and was turned over to the State Department for transfer to the Chinese Maritime Customs as Yung Chun. Her name was struck from the U.S. Naval Vessel Register on 19 July 1946. She was decommissioned and stricken from the rolls of the Republic of China on 1 June 1962. Her ultimate fate is unreported in secondary sources.

== Awards ==
Gavia received two battle stars for World War II service.
