= USS LST-945 =

1944 LST-542-class tank landing ship

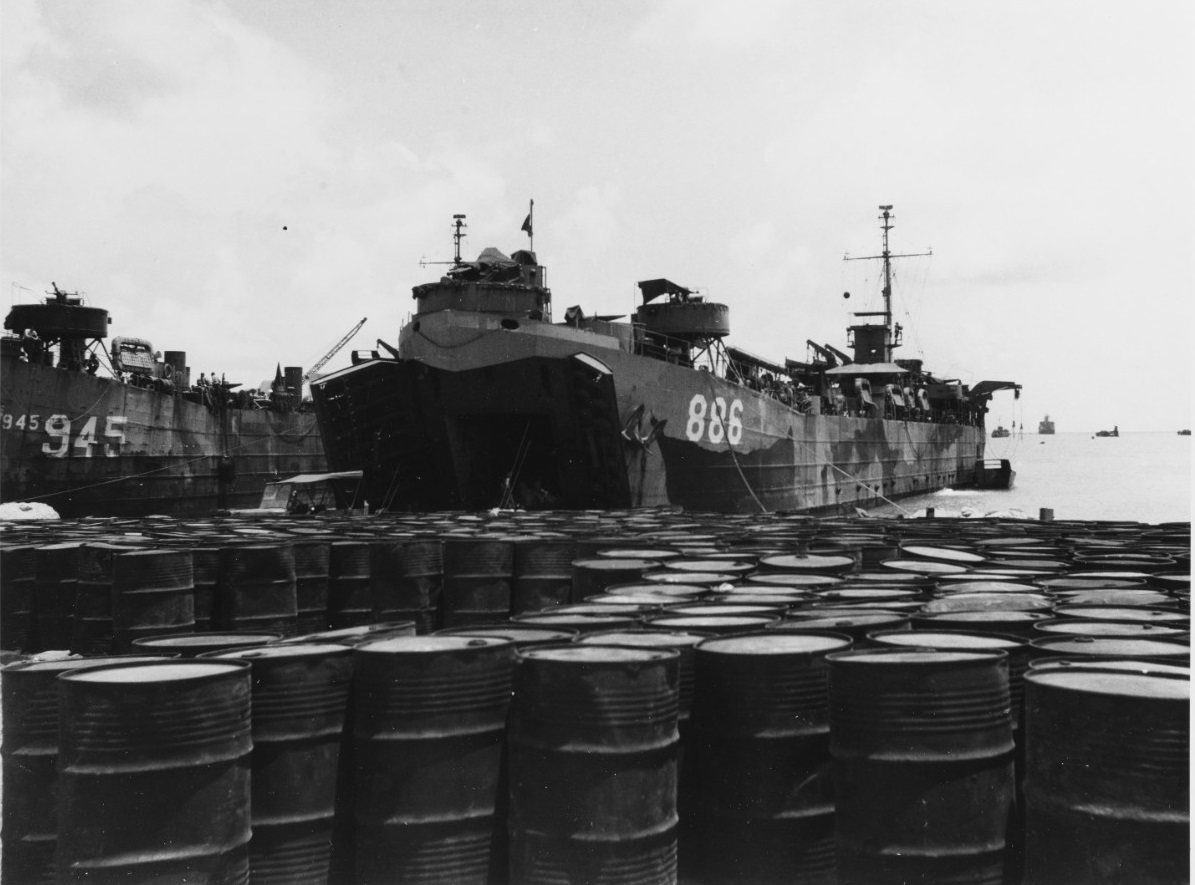
- LST-886 at Tinian, c. December 1945-September 1945, USS LST-945 is at left.

History

United States
- Name: LST-945
- Builder: Bethlehem-Hingham Shipyard, Hingham, Massachusetts
- Yard number: 3415
- Laid down: 11 August 1944
- Launched: 16 September 1944
- Commissioned: 9 October 1944
- Decommissioned: 16 April 1946
- Stricken: 19 July 1946
- Identification: Code letters: NVUB; Hull number: LST-945
- Fate: Transferred to the Maritime Commission (MARCOM), 29 May 1946

Taiwan
- Name: Chung Kong; (中功)
- Acquired: May 1946
- Commissioned: May 1946
- Recommissioned: September 1954
- Decommissioned: 1956
- Identification: Hull number: LST-213

General characteristics
- Class & type: LST-542-class tank landing ship
- Displacement: 1,625 long tons (1,651 t) (light); 4,080 long tons (4,145 t) (full (seagoing draft with 1,675 short tons (1,520 t) load); 2,366 long tons (2,404 t) (beaching)
- Length: 328 ft (100 m) oa
- Beam: 50 ft (15 m)
- Draft: Unloaded: 2 ft 4 in (0.71 m) forward; 7 ft 6 in (2.29 m) aft; Full load: 8 ft 3 in (2.51 m) forward; 14 ft 1 in (4.29 m) aft; Landing with 500 short tons (450 t) load: 3 ft 11 in (1.19 m) forward; 9 ft 10 in (3.00 m) aft; Limiting 11 ft 2 in (3.40 m); Maximum navigation 14 ft 1 in (4.29 m)
- Installed power: 2 × 900 hp (670 kW) Electro-Motive Diesel 12-567A diesel engines; 1,800 shp (1,300 kW)
- Propulsion: 1 × Falk main reduction gears; 2 × Propellers
- Speed: 11.6 kn (21.5 km/h; 13.3 mph)
- Range: 24,000 nmi (44,000 km; 28,000 mi) at 9 kn (17 km/h; 10 mph) while displacing 3,960 long tons (4,024 t)
- Boats & landing craft carried: 2 x LCVPs
- Capacity: 1,600–1,900 short tons (3,200,000–3,800,000 lb; 1,500,000–1,700,000 kg) cargo depending on mission
- Troops: 16 officers, 147 enlisted men
- Complement: 13 officers, 104 enlisted men
- Armament: Varied, ultimate armament; 2 × twin 40 mm (1.57 in) Bofors guns; 4 × single 40 mm Bofors guns; 12 × 20 mm (0.79 in) Oerlikon cannons

Service record
- Part of: LST Flotilla 21
- Operations: Assault and occupation of Okinawa Gunto (1 April–30 June 1945)
- Awards: China Service Medal; American Campaign Medal; Asiatic–Pacific Campaign Medal; World War II Victory Medal

USS LST-945 was an LST-542-class tank landing ship in the United States Navy. Like many of her class, she was not named and is properly referred to by her hull designation.

== Construction and career ==
LST-945 was laid down on 11 August 1944, at Hingham, Massachusetts, by the Bethlehem-Hingham Shipyard; launched on 16 September 1944; and commissioned on 9 October 1944.

During World War II LST-945 was assigned to the Asiatic-Pacific theater and participated in the assault and occupation of Okinawa Gunto from April through June 1945.

Following the war, she saw service in China until early 1946. The ship returned to the United States and was decommissioned on 16 April 1946, and transferred to the Maritime Commission (MARCOM) for disposition on 29 May, that same year. She was struck from the Navy list on 19 July 1946.

== Awards ==
LST-945 earned one battle star for World War II service.

== Bibliography ==
Online resources

- "LST-945". Dictionary of American Naval Fighting Ships. Navy Department, Naval History and Heritage Command. This article incorporates text from this source, which is in the public domain.
- "Bethlehem-Hingham, Hingham MA". www.ShipbuildingHistory.com. 11 August 2011.
- "USS LST-945". NavSource. 24 March 2017.
