= USS Sagadahoc County =

LST-542-class landing ship tank

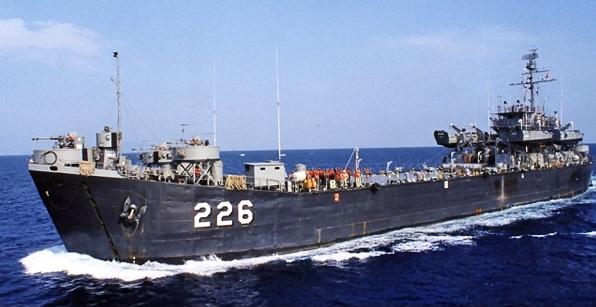
- ROCS Chung Chin

History

United States
- Name: LST-1091
- Builder: American Bridge Company, Ambridge
- Laid down: 3 January 1945
- Launched: 3 March 1945
- Commissioned: 6 April 1945
- Decommissioned: 5 July 1946
- Namesake: Sagadahoc County
- Renamed: Sagadahoc County
- Stricken: 6 February 1959
- Identification: Callsign: NAPV; Pennant number: LST-1091
- Honors and awards: See Awards
- Fate: Transferred to the Republic of China, 1958

Taiwan
- Name: Chung Chin; (中治)
- Acquired: October 1958
- Commissioned: 21 October 1958
- Decommissioned: 1 January 2011
- Identification: Pennant number: LST-226
- Fate: Decommissioned

General characteristics
- Class & type: LST-542-class tank landing ship
- Displacement: 1,625 long tons (1,651 t) light; 4,080 long tons (4,145 t) full
- Length: 328 ft (100 m)
- Beam: 50 ft (15 m)
- Draft: Unloaded : 2 ft 4 in (0.71 m) forward; 7 ft 6 in (2.29 m) aft; Loaded : 8 ft 2 in (2.49 m) forward; 14 ft 1 in (4.29 m) aft
- Propulsion: 2 × General Motors 12-567 diesel engines, two shafts, twin rudders
- Speed: 12 knots (22 km/h; 14 mph)
- Boats & landing craft carried: 2 × LCVPs
- Troops: 16 officers, 147 enlisted men
- Complement: 7 officers, 104 enlisted men
- Armament: 8 × 40 mm guns; 12 × 20 mm guns

USS Sagadahoc County (LST-1091) was a LST-542-class tank landing ship in the United States Navy during World War II. She was transferred to the Republic of China Navy as ROCS Chung Chin (LST-226).

== Construction and commissioning ==
LST-1091 was laid down on 3 January 1945 at American Bridge Company, Ambridge, Pennsylvania. Launched on 3 March 1945 and commissioned on 6 April 1945.

=== Service in United States Navy ===
During World War II, LST-1091 was assigned to the Asiatic-Pacific theater. She was assigned to occupation and China from 15 October 1945 to 4 January 1946.

She was decommissioned on 5 July 1946 and struck from the Naval Register on 6 February 1959 after she was transferred to the Republic of China and renamed Chung Chin (LST-226). While being mothballed on 1 July 1955, she was given the name Sagadahoc County.

=== Service in Republic of China Navy ===
In 1974, she underwent refit at the Hai No. 4 Factory.

On 1 January 2011, she was decommissioned.

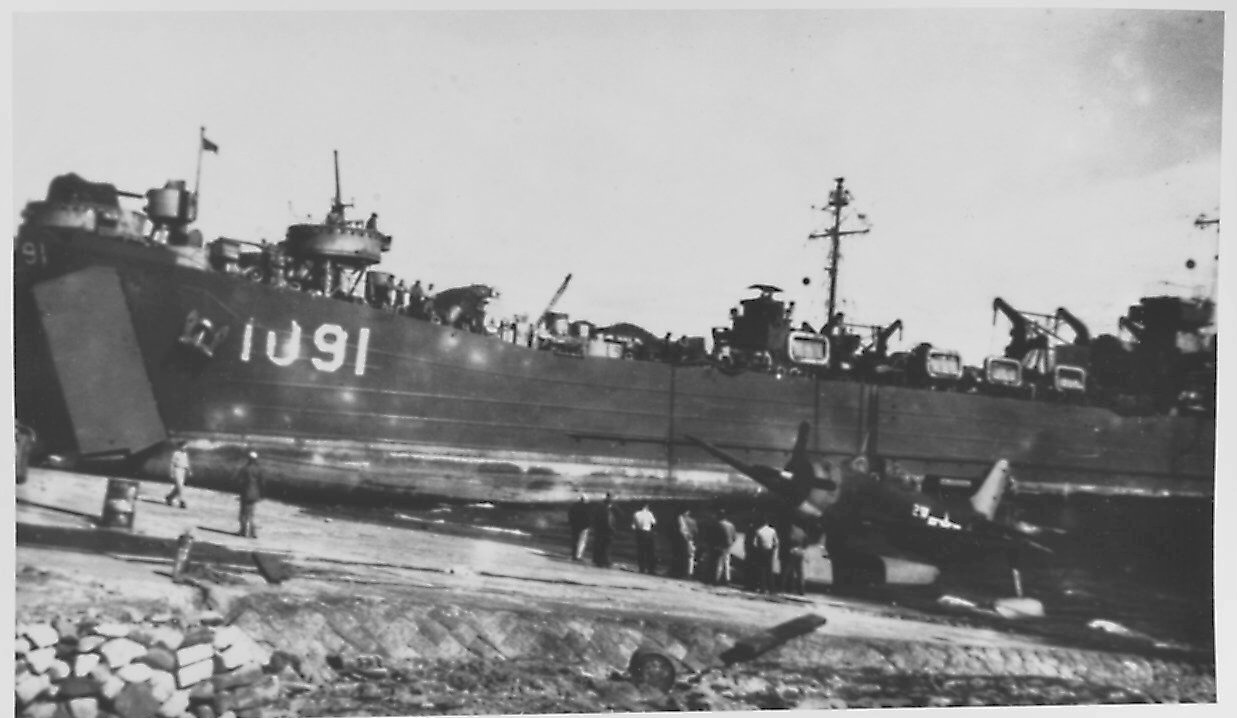
LST-1091 on 31 October 1945

== Awards ==
LST-1091 have earned the following awards:

- American Campaign Medal
- Asiatic-Pacific Campaign Medal
- World War II Victory Medal
- Navy Occupation Service Medal (with Asia clasp)

== Sources ==
- United States. Dept. of the Treasury (1962). Treasury Decisions Under the Customs, Internal Revenue, Industrial Alcohol, Narcotic and Other Laws, Volume 97. U.S. Government Printing Office.
- Moore, Capt. John (1984). Jane's Fighting Ships 1984-85. Jane's Information Group. ISBN 978-0710607959.
- Saunders, Stephen (2009). Jane's Fighting Ships 2009-2010. Jane's Information Group. ISBN 978-0710628886.
- Fairplay International Shipping Journal Volume 222. United Kingdom: Fairplay Publishing Limited. 1967.
