= USS LST-1030 =

LST-542-class landing ship tank

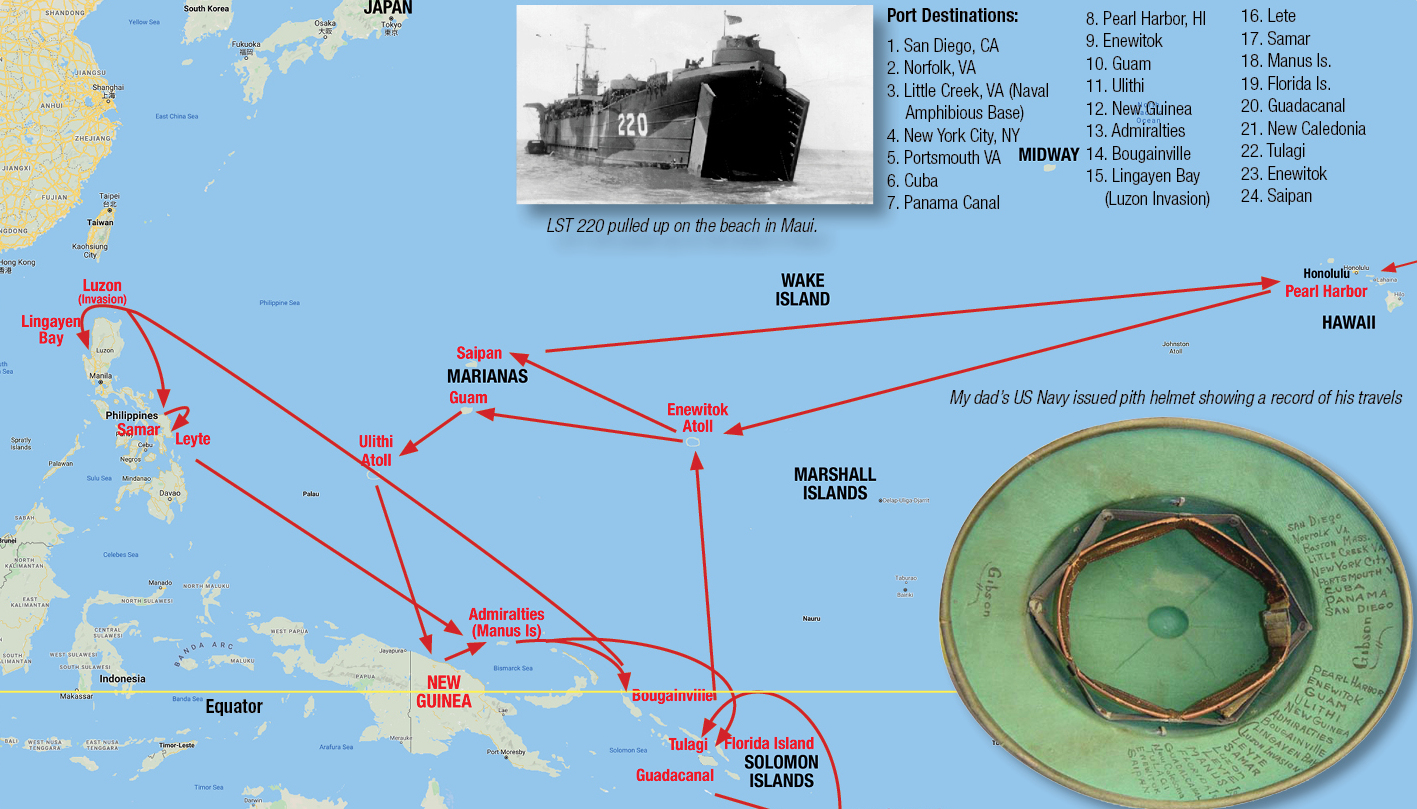
- Map of USS LST-1030's voyages during World War II

History

United States
- Name: LST-1030
- Builder: Boston Navy Yard, Boston
- Laid down: 27 May 1944
- Launched: 25 June 1944
- Sponsored by: Mrs. Irene M. O'Brien
- Commissioned: 19 July 1944
- Decommissioned: 29 May 1946
- Stricken: 12 March 1948
- Identification: Callsign: NVOZ
- Honors and awards: See Awards
- Fate: Transferred to the Republic of China, 1948

Taiwan
- Name: Chung Chuan; (中權)
- Acquired: 17 February 1948
- Commissioned: 17 February 1948
- Decommissioned: 27 May 2009
- Identification: Hull number: LST-221
- Fate: Sunk as target, 2018

General characteristics
- Class & type: LST-542-class tank landing ship
- Displacement: 1,625 long tons (1,651 t) light; 4,080 long tons (4,145 t) full
- Length: 328 ft (100 m)
- Beam: 50 ft (15 m)
- Draft: Unloaded : 2 ft 4 in (0.71 m) forward; 7 ft 6 in (2.29 m) aft; Loaded : 8 ft 2 in (2.49 m) forward; 14 ft 1 in (4.29 m) aft
- Propulsion: 2 × General Motors 12-567 diesel engines, two shafts, twin rudders
- Speed: 12 knots (22 km/h; 14 mph)
- Boats & landing craft carried: 2 × LCVPs
- Troops: 16 officers, 147 enlisted men
- Complement: 7 officers, 104 enlisted men
- Armament: 8 × 40 mm guns; 12 × 20 mm guns

USS LST-1030 was a LST-542-class tank landing ship in the United States Navy during World War II. She was transferred to the Republic of China Navy as ROCS Chung Chuan (LST-221).

== Construction and commissioning ==
LST-1030 was laid down on 27 May 1944 at Boston Navy Yard, Boston, Massachusetts. Launched on 25 June 1944 and commissioned on 19 July 1944.

=== Service in the United States Navy ===
During World War II, LST-1030 was assigned to the Asiatic-Pacific theater. She then participated in the Lingayen Gulf landing on 9 January 1945 and Assault and occupation of Okinawa Gunto from 1 April to 30 June 1945. She was assigned to occupation and China from 12 September 1945 to 29 May 1946.

She was decommissioned on 29 May 1946 and struck from the Naval Register on 12 March 1948 after she was transferred to the Republic of China and renamed Chung Chaun (LST-202).

=== Service in the Republic of China Navy ===
Her original pennant number was LST-202, and it was changed to the logistics fleet repair ship in September 1952 with the number ARL-335.

She was later renamed ROCS Heng Shan (ARL-335) in August 1953.

Her name changed back to Chung Chuan in January 1958 with pennant number LST-221.

In November 1994, she underwent refit at the Hai No. 4 Factory.

On 16 July 2018, she was used as a target ship and was sunk off Lanyu by the Hsiung Feng III anti-ship missile.

== Awards ==
LST-1033 have earned the following awards:

- China Service Medal (extended)
- American Campaign Medal
- Asiatic-Pacific Campaign Medal (2 battle stars)
- World War II Victory Medal
- Navy Occupation Service Medal (with Asia clasp)
- Philippine Presidential Unit Citation
- Philippine Liberation Medal (1 battle star)

== Sources ==
- United States. Dept. of the Treasury (1962). Treasury Decisions Under the Customs, Internal Revenue, Industrial Alcohol, Narcotic and Other Laws, Volume 97. U.S. Government Printing Office.
- Moore, Capt. John (1984). Jane's Fighting Ships 1984-85. Jane's Information Group. ISBN 978-0710607959.
- Saunders, Stephen (2009). Jane's Fighting Ships 2009-2010. Jane's Information Group. ISBN 978-0710628886.
- Fairplay International Shipping Journal Volume 222. United Kingdom: Fairplay Publishing Limited. 1967.
