= USS Lafayette County =

1944 LST-542-class tank landing ship

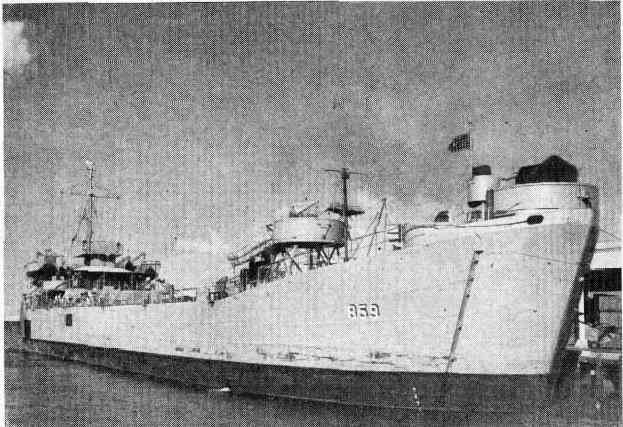
- USS LST-859

History

United States
- Name: LST-859
- Builder: Chicago Bridge & Iron Company, Seneca
- Laid down: 26 September 1944
- Launched: 15 December 1944
- Commissioned: 6 January 1945
- Renamed: Lafayette County, 1 July 1955
- Namesake: Lafayette County
- Decommissioned: 15 August 1958
- Stricken: 15 August 1958
- Identification: Callsign: NINY; Hull number: LST-859
- Honors and awards: See Awards
- Fate: Transferred to the Republic of China, 1958

History

Taiwan
- Name: Chung Cheng; (中程)
- Acquired: 1958
- Commissioned: 1 July 1958
- Decommissioned: 16 September 1986
- Identification: Hull number: LST-224

General characteristics
- Class & type: LST-542-class tank landing ship
- Displacement: 1,625 long tons (1,651 t) light; 4,080 long tons (4,145 t) full
- Length: 328 ft (100 m)
- Beam: 50 ft (15 m)
- Draft: Unloaded : 2 ft 4 in (0.71 m) forward; 7 ft 6 in (2.29 m) aft; Loaded : 8 ft 2 in (2.49 m) forward; 14 ft 1 in (4.29 m) aft
- Propulsion: 2 × General Motors 12-567 diesel engines, two shafts, twin rudders
- Speed: 12 knots (22 km/h; 14 mph)
- Boats & landing craft carried: 2 × LCVPs
- Troops: Approximately 130 officers and enlisted men
- Complement: 8-10 officers, 89-100 enlisted men
- Armament: 8 × 40 mm guns; 12 × 20 mm guns

USS Lafayette County (LST-859) was an LST-542-class tank landing ship built for the United States Navy during World War II. Named after counties in Arkansas, Florida, Mississippi, Missouri, and Wisconsin, and a parish in Louisiana, she was the only U.S. Naval vessel to bear the name.

Originally laid down as LST-859 by the Chicago Bridge & Iron Company of Seneca, Illinois on 26 September 1944; launched on 15 December 1944, sponsored by Mrs. Elsie M. Marcum; and commissioned at Algiers, Louisiana on 6 January 1945.

== Service history ==
=== World War II, 1945 ===
After shakedown in the Gulf of Mexico, LST-859 departed New Orleans on 17 February for the Pacific. Steaming via San Diego and San Francisco, she reached Pearl Harbor on 31 March and during the next six weeks took part in amphibious training. Between 12 and 24 May she steamed to Seattle, Washington, where she embarked Army troops, thence returned to Pearl Harbor on 20 June. Three days later she sailed in convoy for the western Pacific. LST-859 touched at American bases in the Marshalls and Marianas before arriving Okinawa on 28 July. After discharging troops and cargo, she sailed for Saipan on 5 August and remained in the Marianas during the closing days of the war in the Pacific.

=== 1945–1949 ===
She departed for the Philippines on 3 September and, after embarking Army troops at Batangas Bay, Luzon she sailed on 20 September for Japan. LST-859 arrived at Tokyo Bay on 29 September, and during the next two months she supported occupation operations along the Honshū coast from Yokohama to Shiogama. Between 24 October and 19 November she sailed to Subic Bay and back with additional troops. Departing Tokyo Bay on 29 November, she steamed via the Marianas and Pearl Harbor to Seattle where she arrived on 12 January 1946.

Following an extended overhaul, LST-895 departed on 15 May for training along the California coast. On 31 July she departed San Diego for Pearl Harbor; and after arriving on 11 August, she sailed the 18th on a cargo run to American bases in the Hawaiian Islands. During the next four years she carried men and supplies to far-flung American bases in the Pacific. Cargo and passenger runs sent her to the Marshalls, the Solomons, American Samoa, the Aleutians, and Midway, as well as to the nearby islands of the Hawaiian chain.

=== Korean War, 1950–1954 ===
After the outbreak of Communist aggression against the Republic of Korea (South Korea) in June 1950, LST-859 departed Pearl Harbor on 18 August for the Far East. She arrived Kobe, Japan on 5 September and there embarked elements of the 1st Marine Division for the scheduled invasion at Inchon, South Korea, which was designed to spearhead the American counteroffensive against Communist troops from North Korea. Assigned to Task Element 90.32, LST-859 sortied in convoy on 10 September and arrived off Inchon on 15 September while a combined air-sea bombardment blasted enemy defenses. Late that afternoon, the LST closed "Red Beach;" and, as lead ship, she came under heavy mortar and machine gun fire. Despite the concentrated fire, she debarked assault troops and unloaded vital support equipment. In addition her guns wiped out enemy batteries on the right flank of "Red Beach". She completed unloading and cleared the beach at high tide early on 16 September. For daring bravery and heroic performance of duty on "Red Beach", the gallant and aggressive landing ship tanks of Task Element 90.32, including LST-859, received the Navy Unit Commendation. LST-859 departed for Japan the 17th; and, after reaching Sasebo on 20 September, she sailed six days later for Pearl Harbor, where she arrived on 13 October.

After undergoing overhaul, she resumed cargo runs in the Pacific. Between 20 January and 21 June 1951 she shuttled cargo among bases in the Marshalls, the Gilberts, and the Carolines. During December she carried supplies to Guam and Iwo Jima; thence, she sailed via the Philippines to Sasebo where she arrived on 22 January 1952.

For almost 2½ years LST-859 served in the western Pacific in support of American peacekeeping efforts in the troubled Far East. Operating primarily out of Sasebo, she bolstered the seaborne supply line to U.S. forces in South Korea and carried vital military supplies to ports on both coasts, including Chuminjin, Ulsan Man, and Inchon. In addition, she shuttled cargo along the Japanese coast; and, following the end of conflict on the Korean peninsula, she continued her important supply runs until departing Yokosuka on 18 May 1954 for Pearl Harbor where she arrived on 3 June.

=== 1954–1957 ===
LST-859 resumed her pattern of cargo runs to Pacific bases on 20 June, and during the remainder of the year steamed primarily between Pearl Harbor and Midway. On 24 March 1955 she again deployed to the Far East, arriving Yokosuka on 11 April. During the next four months supply runs out of Yokosuka and Sasebo sent her to ports in South Korea, Formosa, Hong Kong, and the Philippines. Named USS Lafayette County (LST-859) on 1 July 1955, she returned to Pearl Harbor on 31 August to resume cargo shuttle runs among the Hawaiian Islands. Lafayette County served principally in the Hawaiian chain during the next three years, although from 3 March to 13 April 1957 she carried out cargo runs to bases in the Marshalls.

=== Decommissioning and transfer ===
She decommissioned on 15 August 1958 at Pearl Harbor and was transferred to the custody of the Republic of China under the Military Assistance Program, where she served the Chinese Nationalist Navy as ROCS Chung Cheng (LST-224). Chung Cheng (Chinese: 中程) served as a military supply ship.

She participated in the recovery of Dongsha Island, but some believe that it will only provide support for Dongsha Island in the later period.

However, historical data records show that the ship also served as a replenishment mission for the Nansha Islands and the Paracel Islands in 1947. In any case, the ship contributed to the recovery mission of the South China Sea Islands.

She was decommission and sealed up on 16 September 1986.

== Awards ==
LST-859 received one battle star for World War II service and six battle stars for Korean War service.
