= USS LST-537 =

LST-491-class landing ship tank

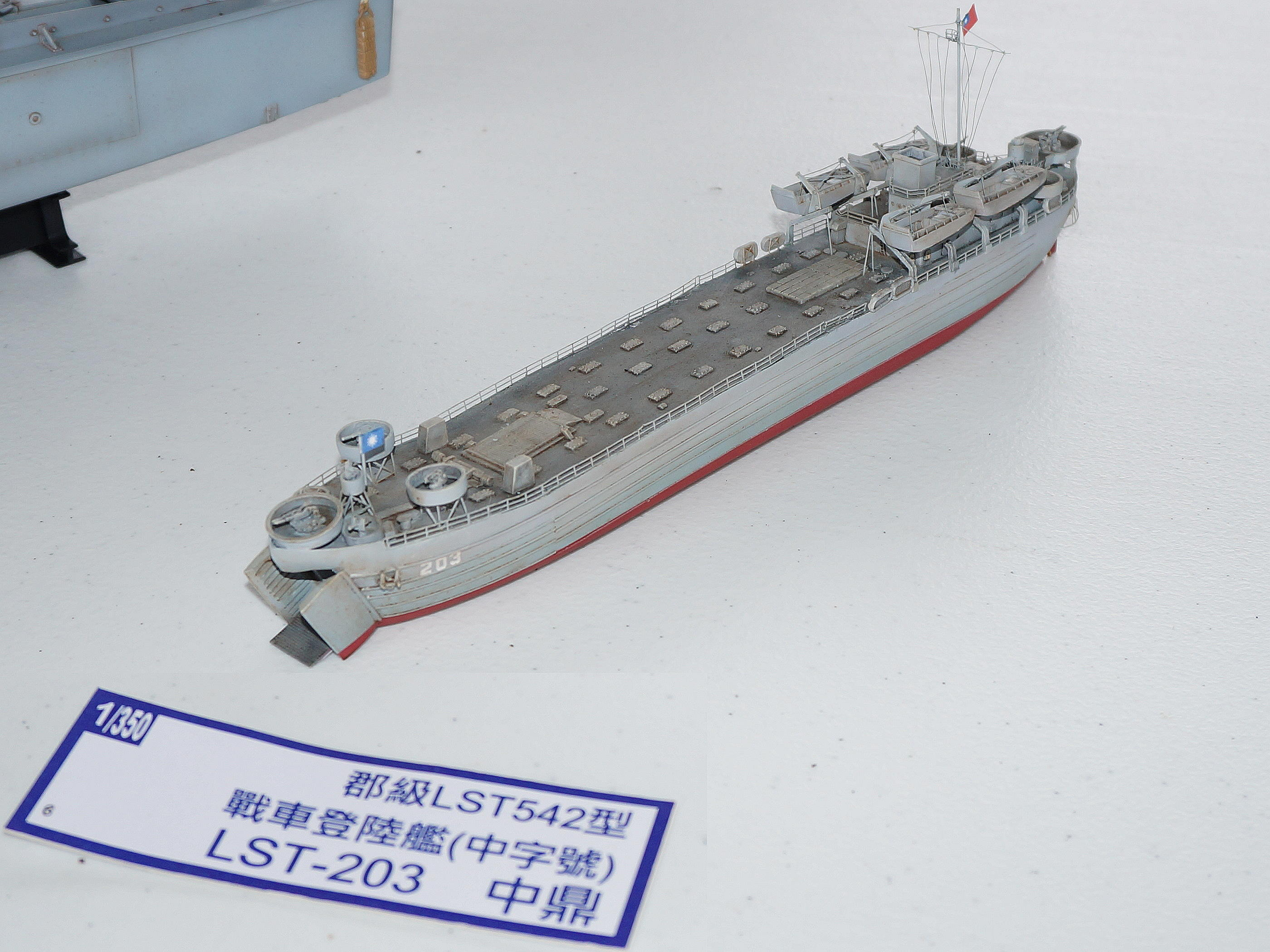
- Model of ROCS Chung Ting

History

United States
- Name: LST-537
- Builder: Missouri Valley Bridge and Iron Co., Evansville
- Laid down: 27 October 1943
- Launched: 31 December 1943
- Sponsored by: Mrs. Robert C. Dean
- Commissioned: 2 February 1944
- Decommissioned: 29 May 1946
- Stricken: 12 March 1948
- Identification: Callsign: NEAX
- Honors and awards: See Awards
- Fate: Transferred to Republic of China, 1946

Taiwan
- Name: Chung Ting; (中鼎)
- Acquired: 29 May 1946
- Commissioned: 29 May 1946
- Decommissioned: 18 February 1989
- Identification: Hull number: LST-203
- Status: Decommissioned

General characteristics
- Class & type: LST-491-class tank landing ship
- Displacement: 1,625 long tons (1,651 t) (light); 4,080 long tons (4,145 t) (full (seagoing draft with 1,675 short tons (1,520 t) load); 2,366 long tons (2,404 t) (beaching)
- Length: 328 ft (100 m) oa
- Beam: 50 ft (15 m)
- Draft: Unloaded: 2 ft 4 in (0.71 m) forward; 7 ft 6 in (2.29 m) aft; Full load: 8 ft 3 in (2.51 m) forward; 14 ft 1 in (4.29 m) aft; Landing with 500 short tons (450 t) load: 3 ft 11 in (1.19 m) forward; 9 ft 10 in (3.00 m) aft
- Installed power: 2 × 900 hp (670 kW) Electro-Motive Diesel 12-567A diesel engines; 1,700 shp (1,300 kW)
- Propulsion: 1 × Falk main reduction gears; 2 × Propellers
- Speed: 12 kn (22 km/h; 14 mph)
- Range: 24,000 nmi (44,000 km; 28,000 mi) at 9 kn (17 km/h; 10 mph) while displacing 3,960 long tons (4,024 t)
- Boats & landing craft carried: 6 x LCVPs
- Capacity: 1,600–1,900 short tons (3,200,000–3,800,000 lb; 1,500,000–1,700,000 kg) cargo depending on mission
- Troops: 16 officers, 147 enlisted men
- Complement: 13 officers, 104 enlisted men
- Armament: Varied, ultimate armament; 2 × twin 40 mm (1.57 in) Bofors guns; 4 × single 40 mm Bofors guns; 12 × 20 mm (0.79 in) Oerlikon cannons

USS LST-537 was a LST-491-class tank landing ship in the United States Navy during World War II. She was transferred to the Republic of China Navy as ROCS Chung Ting (LST-203).

== Construction and commissioning ==
LST-537 was laid down on 27 October 1943 at Missouri Valley Bridge and Iron Company, Evansville, Indiana. Launched on 31 December 1943 and commissioned on 2 February 1944.

=== Service in the United States Navy ===
During World War II, LST-537 was assigned to the Asiatic-Pacific theater. She then participated in the Invasion of Normandy from 6 to 25 June 1944. She was assigned to occupation and China from 2 to 22 January 1946.

She was decommissioned on 29 May 1946 and struck from the Naval Register, 12 March 1948.

=== Service in the Republic of China Navy ===
She was acquired and commissioned into the Republic of China Navy on 29 May 1946 and renamed Chung Ting (LST-203).

Chung Hai was decommissioned on 12 March 1989.

== Awards ==
LST-537 have earned the following awards:

- China Service Medal (extended)
- American Campaign Medal
- European-Africa-Middle East Campaign Medal (1 battle star)
- Asiatic-Pacific Campaign Medal
- World War II Victory Medal
- Navy Occupation Service Medal (with Asia clasp)

== Sources ==
- United States. Dept. of the Treasury (1962). Treasury Decisions Under the Customs, Internal Revenue, Industrial Alcohol, Narcotic and Other Laws, Volume 97. U.S. Government Printing Office.
- Moore, Capt. John (1984). Jane's Fighting Ships 1984-85. Jane's Information Group. ISBN 978-0710607959.
- Saunders, Stephen (2009). Jane's Fighting Ships 2009-2010. Jane's Information Group. ISBN 978-0710628886.
- Fairplay International Shipping Journal Volume 222. United Kingdom: Fairplay Publishing Limited. 1967.
