= ROCS Kun Ming =

Kang Ding class frigate

History

Taiwan
- Name: Kun Ming; (昆明)
- Namesake: Kun Ming
- Builder: DCNS, Lorient
- Laid down: 6 November 1994
- Launched: 13 May 1995
- Acquired: 1997
- Commissioned: 26 February 1997
- Home port: Zuoying
- Identification: Pennant number: PFG-1205
- Status: Active

General characteristics
- Class & type: Kang Ding-class frigate
- Displacement: 3,200 tonnes, 3,800 tonnes fully loaded
- Length: 125 m (410 ft)
- Beam: 15.4 m (51 ft)
- Draught: 4.1 m (13 ft)
- Propulsion: 4 diesel SEMT Pielstick 12PA6V280 STC2, 21,000 hp (16,000 kW)
- Speed: 25 kn (46 km/h; 29 mph)
- Range: 4,000 nmi (7,400 km; 4,600 mi) at 15 kn (28 km/h; 17 mph); 9,000 nmi (17,000 km; 10,000 mi) at 12 kn (22 km/h; 14 mph)
- Endurance: 50 days of food
- Boats & landing craft carried: 2 × ETN boats
- Capacity: 350 tonnes of fuel, 80 m³ of kerosene, 60 tonnes of potable water
- Complement: 12 officers; 68 petty officers; 61 men
- Sensors & processing systems: 1 × CastorII fire control radar; 1 x DRBV-26D Jupiter-II two-dimensional air search radar; 1 x Poseidon Triton G search radar; Najir photoelectric director; Alose Sonar System
- Armament: Anti-ship; 8 × Hsiung Feng II anti-ship missiles; 1 x MIM-72 Chaparral; 2 x Mark 32 Surface Vessel Torpedo Tubes; Guns; 1 × OTO Melara 76 mm; 2 × Bofors 40 mm L70 guns; CIWS; 1 × Phalanx CIWS
- Armour: On sensitive areas (munition magazine and control centre)
- Aircraft carried: 1 × Sikorsky S-70C (M)
- Aviation facilities: Hangar and helipad

ROCS Kun Ming (PFG-1205) (Chinese: 昆明; lit. 'Kun Ming') is a Kang Ding-class frigate of the Republic of China Navy.

== Development and design ==
As the ROC (Taiwan)'s defensive stance is aimed towards the Taiwan Strait, the ROC Navy is constantly seeking to upgrade its anti-submarine warfare capabilities. The US$1.75 billion agreement with France in the early 1990s was an example of this procurement strategy, the six ships are configured for both ASW and surface attack. The Exocet was replaced by Taiwan-developed Hsiung Feng II anti-ship missile and the AAW weapon is the Sea Chaparral. The main gun is an Oto Melara 76 mm/62 mk 75 gun, similar to its Singaporean counterparts, the Formidable-class frigates. Some problems in the integration of Taiwanese and French systems had been reported. The frigate carries a single Sikorsky S-70C(M)-1/2 ASW helicopter.

The Sea Chaparral SAM system is considered inadequate for defense against aircraft and anti-ship missiles, so the ROC (Taiwan) Navy plans to upgrade its air-defense capabilities with the indigenous TC-2N in 2020. The missiles will be quad-packed in a vertical launch system for future ROCN surface combatants, but a less-risky alternative arrangement of above-deck, fixed oblique launchers is seen as more likely for upgrading these French-built frigates.

== Construction and career ==
Kun Ming was launched on 5 November 1994 at the DCNS in Lorient. Commissioned on 5 October 1996.

In 2010, she visited Palau, Solomon Islands and Tuvalu by the Dunmu Voyage Training Detachment led by Major General Mei Jiashu.

On 25 May 2013, Kun Ming encountered a US military aircraft reconnaissance on its way back from Taiping Island. Kunming's observation spot used a high-powered telescope at 4:35 pm to find an unknown aircraft 5 miles away from the left front of the warship. The warship was radioed throughout the mission. Launching control, at that time, we observed by observation, and at the same time used electric reconnaissance to confirm and grasp the other party's dynamics. The whole distance was 5 miles away from Kunming. She kept the radio silent because of the mission, and the US military approached the confirmed target.

She participated in the 2014 Dunmu Voyage Training Detachment, which was open to visit at East Pier 5 of the Keelung Naval Base from March 26 to 27. The supply ship ROCS Wu Yi served as the flagship for Kunming and ROCS Tzu I. Major General Li Dongfang led a team to visit the Solomon Islands, Kiribati, and Palau.

Participated in the Dunmu Voyage Training Detachment in 2018. ROCS Wu Yi served as the flagship for Kunming and ROCS Pan Chao. They sailed for a total of 105 days with a voyage of 23,000 miles. In order to effectively save navigation time and fuel consumption, Cooperating with the planning of the route of the visit, it passed the Panama Canal twice to and from the Pacific and the Atlantic. Major General Gao Jiabin led a team to visit the Marshall Islands, El Salvador, Nicaragua, Dominican Republic, Honduras, Guatemala.

On 15 December 2018, the West Wharf of the Zuoying Military Region, Kunming held the Celebration of the 21st Anniversary of the Army and the Family Relations.

== Gallery ==
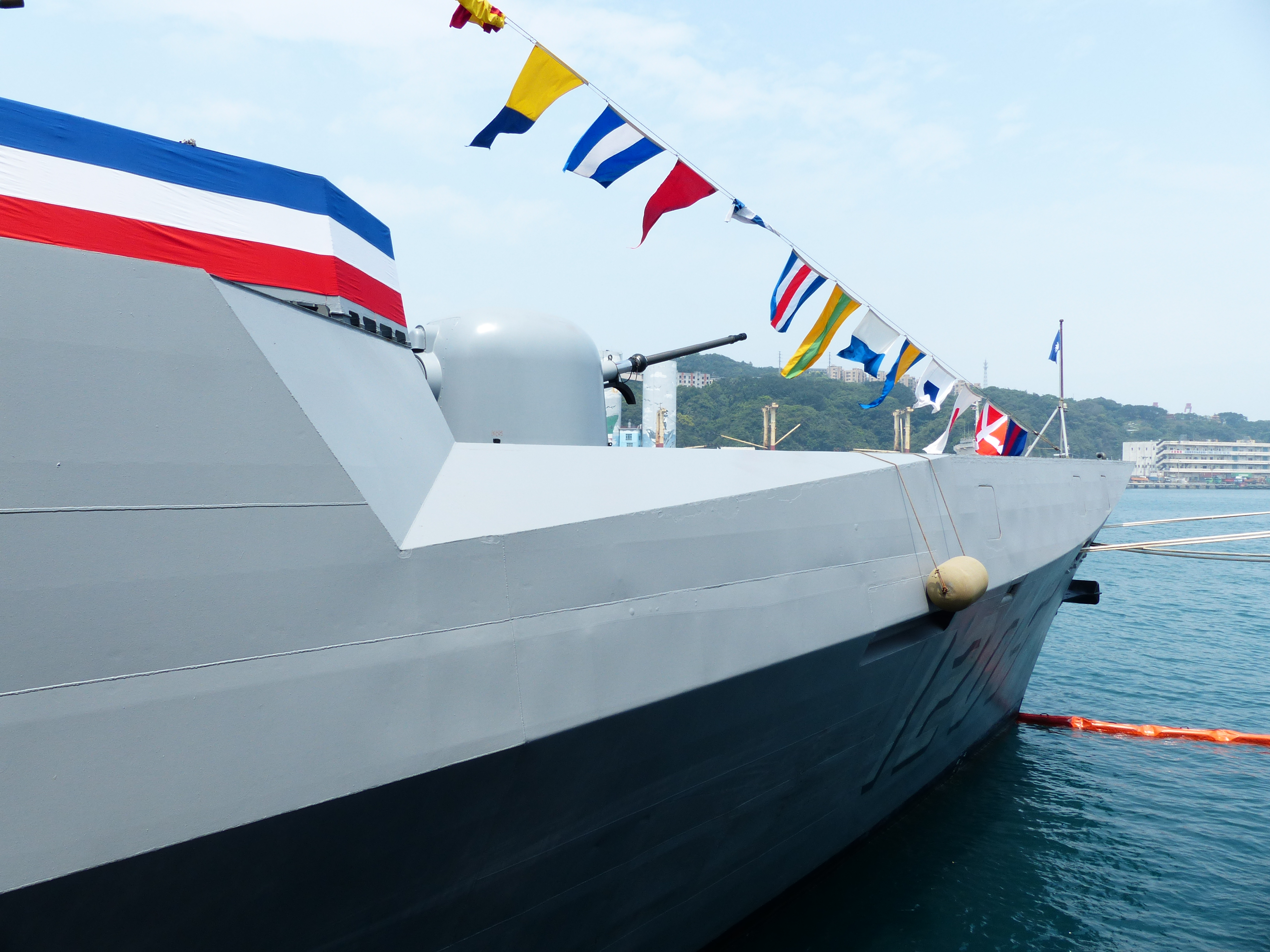
ROCS Kun Ming on 27 March 2014.

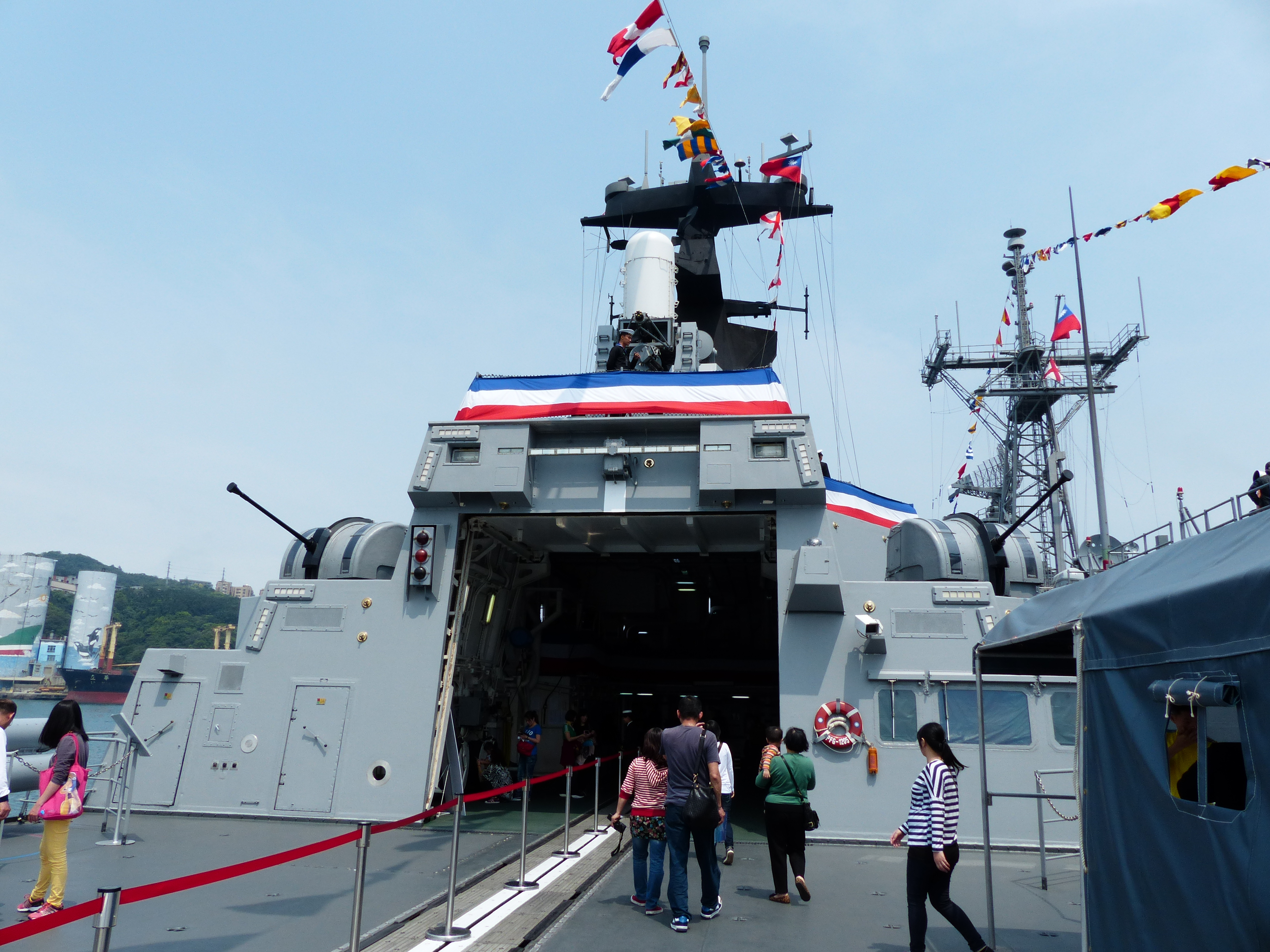
ROCS Kun Ming's hangar on 27 March 2014.

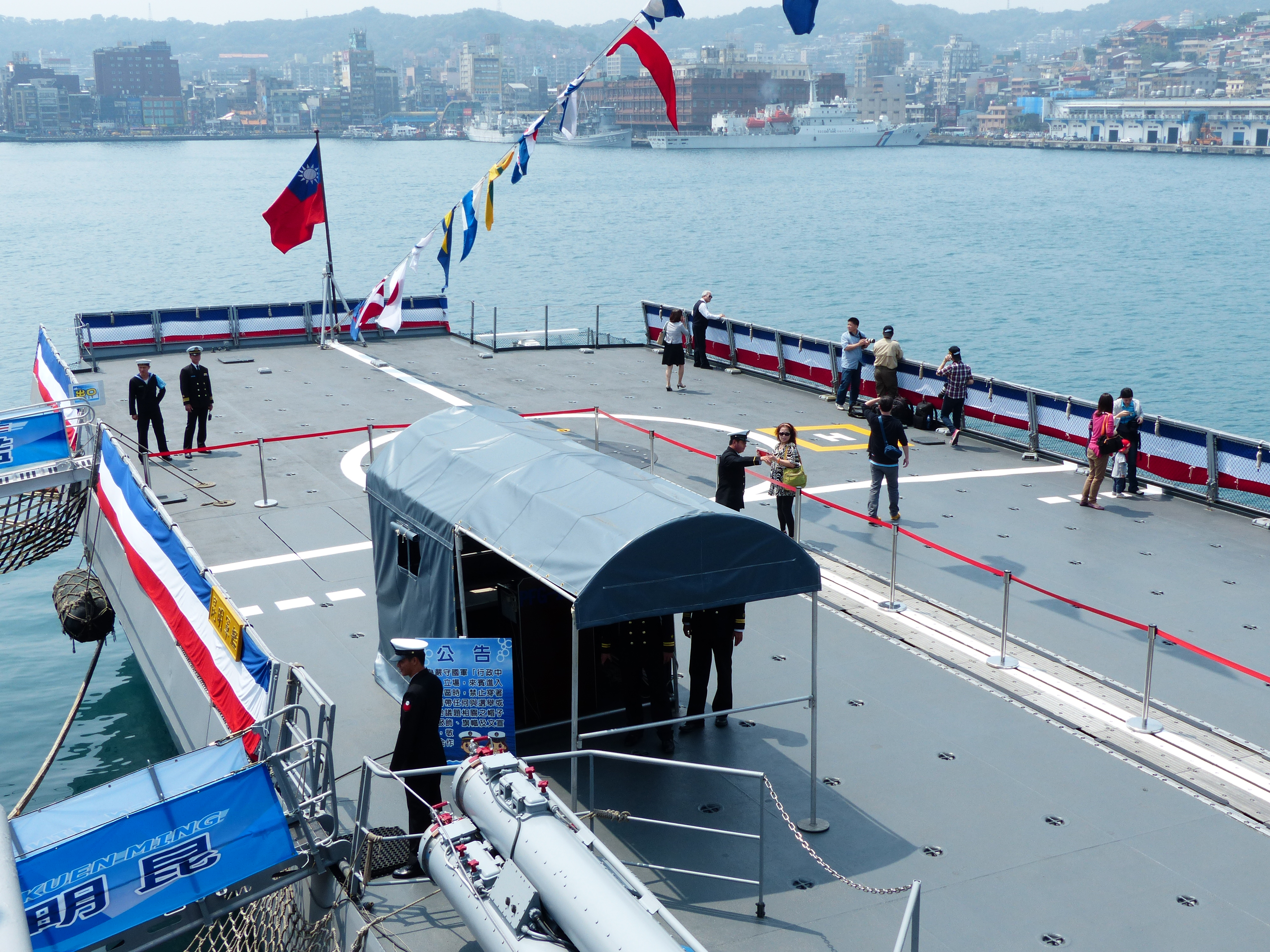
ROCS Kun Ming's helipad on 27 March 2014.
