= Kang Ding =

Kang Ding or Kangding may refer to:

- Kang Ding or Geng Ding (reigned c. 1170–1147 BC), king of the Shang dynasty
- Kangding (1040–1041), reign period of Emperor Renzong of Song
- ROCS Kang Ding, a frigate of the Republic of China Navy
- Kangding, a city in Garzê Tibetan Autonomous Prefecture, Sichuan, China
