= ROCS Chen De =

Republic of China frigate

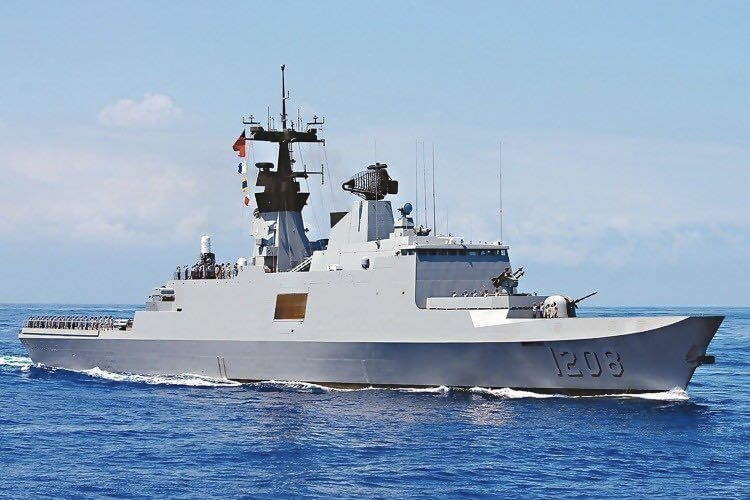
- ROCS Chen De

History

Republic of China
- Name: Chen De; (承德)
- Namesake: Chen De
- Builder: DCNS, Lorient
- Laid down: 27 December 1995
- Launched: 2 August 1996
- Acquired: 1998
- Commissioned: 19 March 1998
- Home port: Zuoying
- Identification: Pennant number: PFG-1208
- Status: Active

General characteristics
- Class & type: Kang Ding-class frigate
- Displacement: 3,200 tonnes, 3,800 tonnes fully loaded
- Length: 125 m (410 ft)
- Beam: 15.4 m (51 ft)
- Draught: 4.1 m (13 ft)
- Propulsion: 4 diesel SEMT Pielstick 12PA6V280 STC2, 21,000 hp (16,000 kW)
- Speed: 25 kn (46 km/h; 29 mph)
- Range: 4,000 nmi (7,400 km; 4,600 mi) at 15 kn (28 km/h; 17 mph); 9,000 nmi (17,000 km; 10,000 mi) at 12 kn (22 km/h; 14 mph)
- Endurance: 50 days of food
- Boats & landing craft carried: 2 × ETN boats
- Capacity: 350 tonnes of fuel, 80 m³ of kerosene, 60 tonnes of potable water
- Complement: 12 officers; 68 petty officers; 61 men
- Sensors & processing systems: 2 × CastorII fire control radar; 1 x DRBV-26D Jupiter-II two-dimensional air search radar; 1 x Type 997 Artisan radar; Najir photoelectric director; Alose Sonar System
- Armament: Anti-ship; 8 × Hsiung Feng II anti-ship missiles; 32 x TC-2N; 2 x Mark 32 Surface Vessel Torpedo Tubes; Guns; 1 × OTO Melara 76 mm; 2 × Bofors 40 mm L70 guns; CIWS; 1 × Phalanx CIWS
- Armour: On sensitive areas (munition magazine and control centre)
- Aircraft carried: 1 × Sikorsky S-70C (M)
- Aviation facilities: Hangar and helipad

ROCS Chen De (PFG-1208) (Chinese: 承德; lit. 'Chengde') is a Kang Ding-class frigate of the Republic of China Navy.

== Development and design ==
As the ROC's defensive stance is aimed towards the Taiwan Strait, the ROC Navy is constantly seeking to upgrade its anti-submarine warfare capabilities. The US$1.75 billion agreement with France in the early 1990s was an example of this procurement strategy, the six ships are configured for both ASW and surface attack. The Exocet was replaced by Taiwan-developed Hsiung Feng II anti-ship missile and the AAW weapon is the Sea Chaparral. The main gun is an Oto Melara 76 mm/62 mk 75 gun, similar to its Singaporean counterparts, the Formidable-class frigates. Some problems in the integration of Taiwanese and French systems had been reported. The frigate carries a single Sikorsky S-70C(M)-1/2 ASW helicopter.

The Sea Chaparral SAM system is considered inadequate for defense against aircraft and anti-ship missiles, so the ROC Navy plans to upgrade its air-defense capabilities with the indigenous TC-2N in 2020. The missiles will be quad-packed in a vertical launch system for future ROCN surface combatants. On February 3, 2026, after completing relevant tests, the ship was delivered to the Republic of China Navy. The original MIM-72 missiles were replaced by TC-2N missiles equipped in the vertical launch system, and the Triton-G radar was replaced with the Type 997 radar.

== Construction and career ==
Chen De was launched on 2 August 1996 at the DCNS in Lorient. Commissioned on 19 March 1998.

In May 2013, Hong Shicheng, the captain of Guangxing 28, was killed by the Philippine Coast Guard’s fire on a Taiwanese fishing boat, which led to tensions between Taiwan and the Philippines. For this reason, the Southern Regional Patrol Bureau of the Coastal Patrol Administration of the Republic of China Executive Yuan's Coastal Patrol Bureau announced on May 12. Chen De and the Jiyang-class missile frigate, formed a joint fleet to go to the waters around Taiwan and the Philippines to strengthen maritime patrols.
