= ROCS Wu Chang =

Republic of China frigate

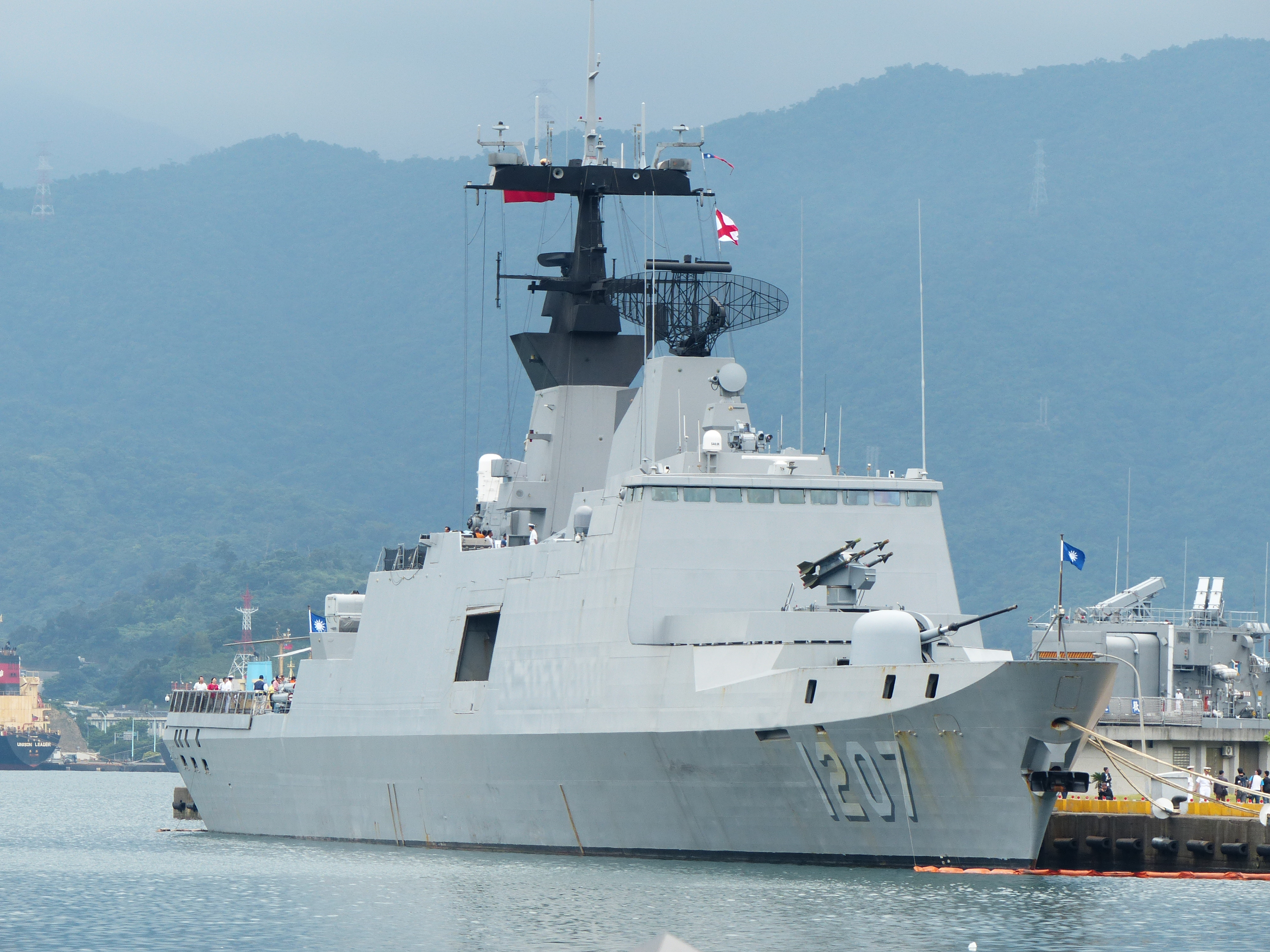
- ROCS Wu Chang at Zhongzheng Naval Base on 4 May 2013

History

Taiwan
- Name: Wu Chang; (武昌)
- Namesake: Wu Chang
- Builder: DCNS, Lorient
- Laid down: 1 July 1995
- Launched: 27 November 1995
- Acquired: 1997
- Commissioned: 16 December 1997
- Home port: Zuoying Naval Base
- Identification: Pennant number: PFG-1207
- Status: Active

General characteristics
- Class & type: Kang Ding-class frigate
- Displacement: 3,200 tonnes, 3,800 tonnes fully loaded
- Length: 125 m (410 ft)
- Beam: 15.4 m (51 ft)
- Draught: 4.1 m (13 ft)
- Propulsion: 4 diesel SEMT Pielstick 12PA6V280 STC2, 21,000 hp (16,000 kW)
- Speed: 25 kn (46 km/h; 29 mph)
- Range: 4,000 nmi (7,400 km; 4,600 mi) at 15 kn (28 km/h; 17 mph); 9,000 nmi (17,000 km; 10,000 mi) at 12 kn (22 km/h; 14 mph)
- Endurance: 50 days of food
- Boats & landing craft carried: 2 × ETN boats
- Capacity: 350 tonnes of fuel, 80 m³ of kerosene, 60 tonnes of potable water
- Complement: 12 officers; 68 petty officers; 61 men
- Sensors & processing systems: 1 × CastorII fire control radar; 1 x DRBV-26D Jupiter-II two-dimensional air search radar; 1 x Poseidon Triton G search radar; Najir photoelectric director; Alose Sonar System
- Armament: Anti-ship; 8 × Hsiung Feng II anti-ship missiles; 1 x MIM-72 Chaparral; 2 x Mark 32 Surface Vessel Torpedo Tubes; Guns; 1 × OTO Melara 76 mm; 2 × Bofors 40 mm L70 guns; CIWS; 1 × Phalanx CIWS
- Armour: On sensitive areas (munition magazine and control centre)
- Aircraft carried: 1 × Sikorsky S-70C (M)
- Aviation facilities: Hangar and helipad

ROCS Wu Chang (PFG-1207) (Chinese: 武昌; lit. 'Wuchang') is a Kang Ding-class frigate of the Republic of China Navy.

== Development and design ==
As the ROC (Taiwan)'s defensive stance is aimed towards the Taiwan Strait, the ROC Navy is constantly seeking to upgrade its anti-submarine warfare capabilities. The US$1.75 billion agreement with France in the early 1990s was an example of this procurement strategy, the six ships are configured for both ASW and surface attack. The Exocet was replaced by Taiwan-developed Hsiung Feng II anti-ship missile and the AAW weapon is the Sea Chaparral. The main gun is an Oto Melara 76 mm/62 mk 75 gun, similar to its Singaporean counterparts, the Formidable-class frigates. Some problems in the integration of Taiwanese and French systems had been reported. The frigate carries a single Sikorsky S-70C(M)-1/2 ASW helicopter.

The Sea Chaparral SAM system is considered inadequate for defense against aircraft and anti-ship missiles, so the ROC (Taiwan) Navy plans to upgrade its air-defense capabilities with the indigenous TC-2N in 2020. The missiles will be quad-packed in a vertical launch system for future ROCN surface combatants, but a less-risky alternative arrangement of above-deck, fixed oblique launchers is seen as more likely for upgrading these French-built frigates.

== Construction and career ==
Wu Chang was launched on 27 November 1995 at the DCNS in Lorient. Commissioned on 16 December 1997.

On 31 January 2018, the Ministry of National Defense of the Republic of China conducted the Chinese New Year Strengthened Combat Readiness Exercise at the Zuoying Naval Base, with Wu Chang as its flagship. The Captain Huang Shuqing of the Wuchang warship was the first female captain of a first-class combat ship of the Republic of China Navy.

On March 7, 2019, while Wu Chang was conducting equipment maintenance and preparing for training with the Dunmu Far Eastern Navigation Training Detachment at Zuoying Military Port, a soldier fell from the three-story deck onto the dock, suffering multiple fractures; on March 11, another soldier fell from the ladder onto the dock.

== Gallery ==
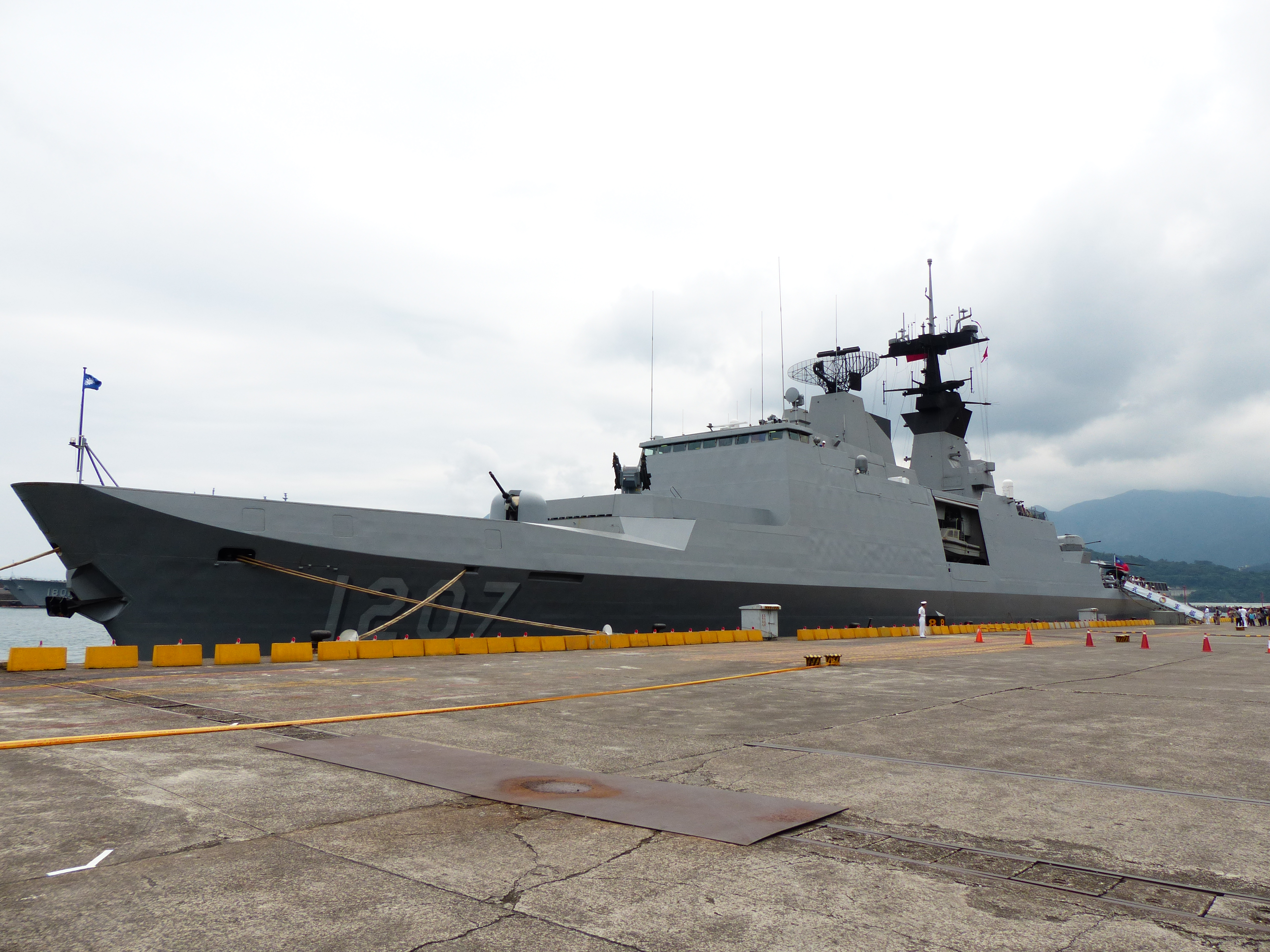
Wu Chang at Zhongzheng Naval Base on 4 May 2013.

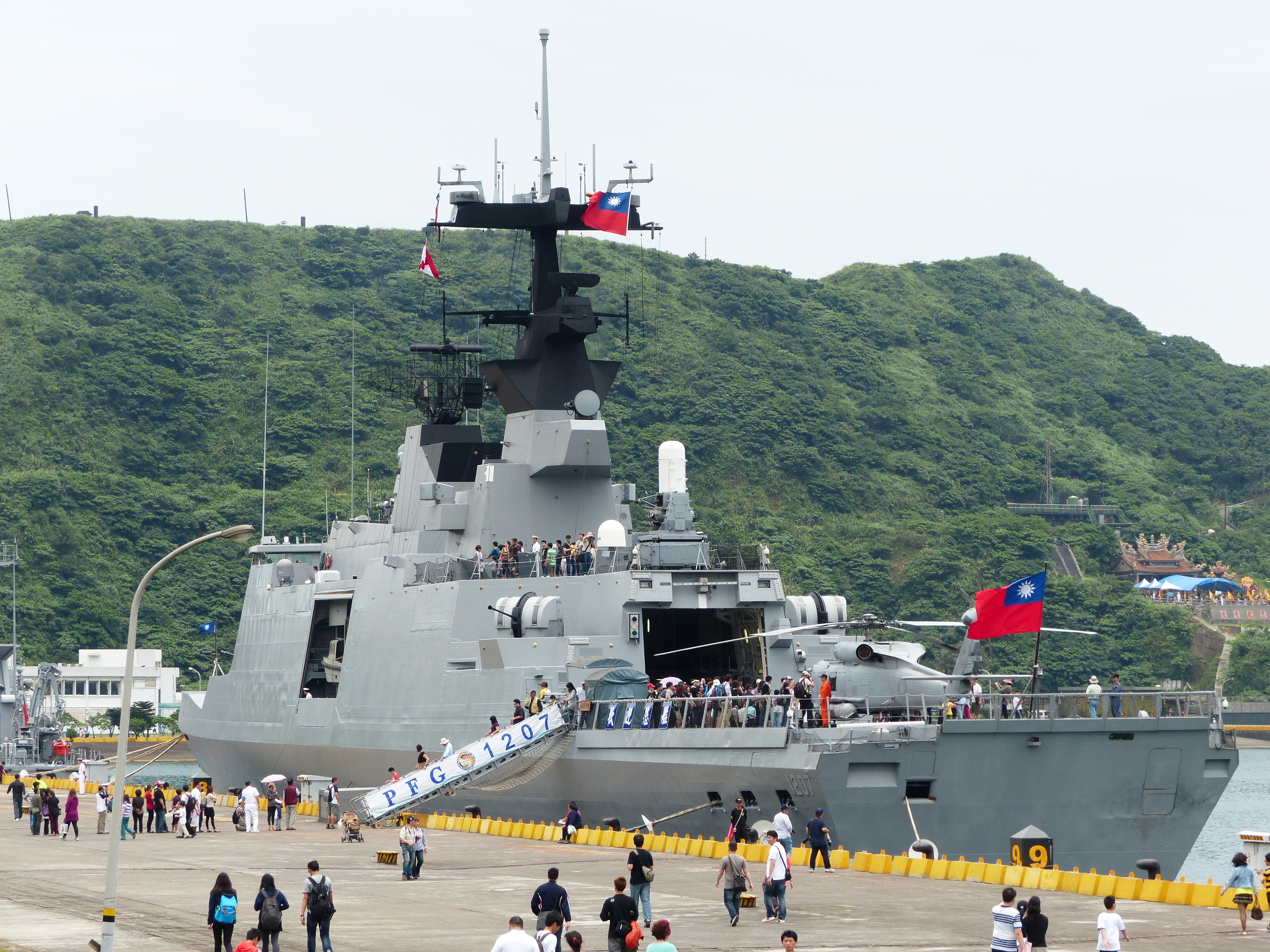
Wu Chang at Zhongzheng Naval Base on 4 May 2013.

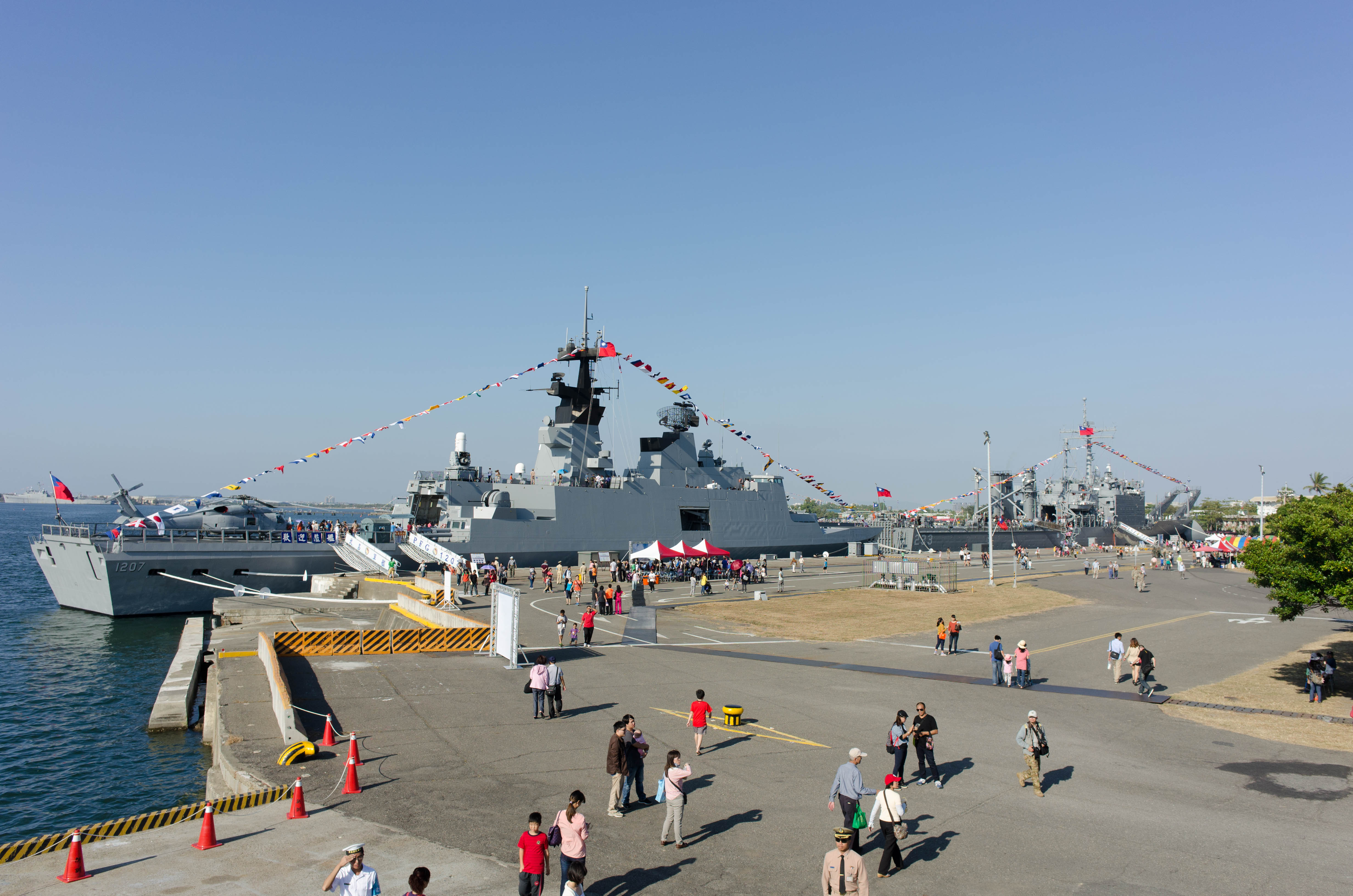
Wu Chang and ROCS Chong Ping at Zuoying Naval Base on 23 November 2014.

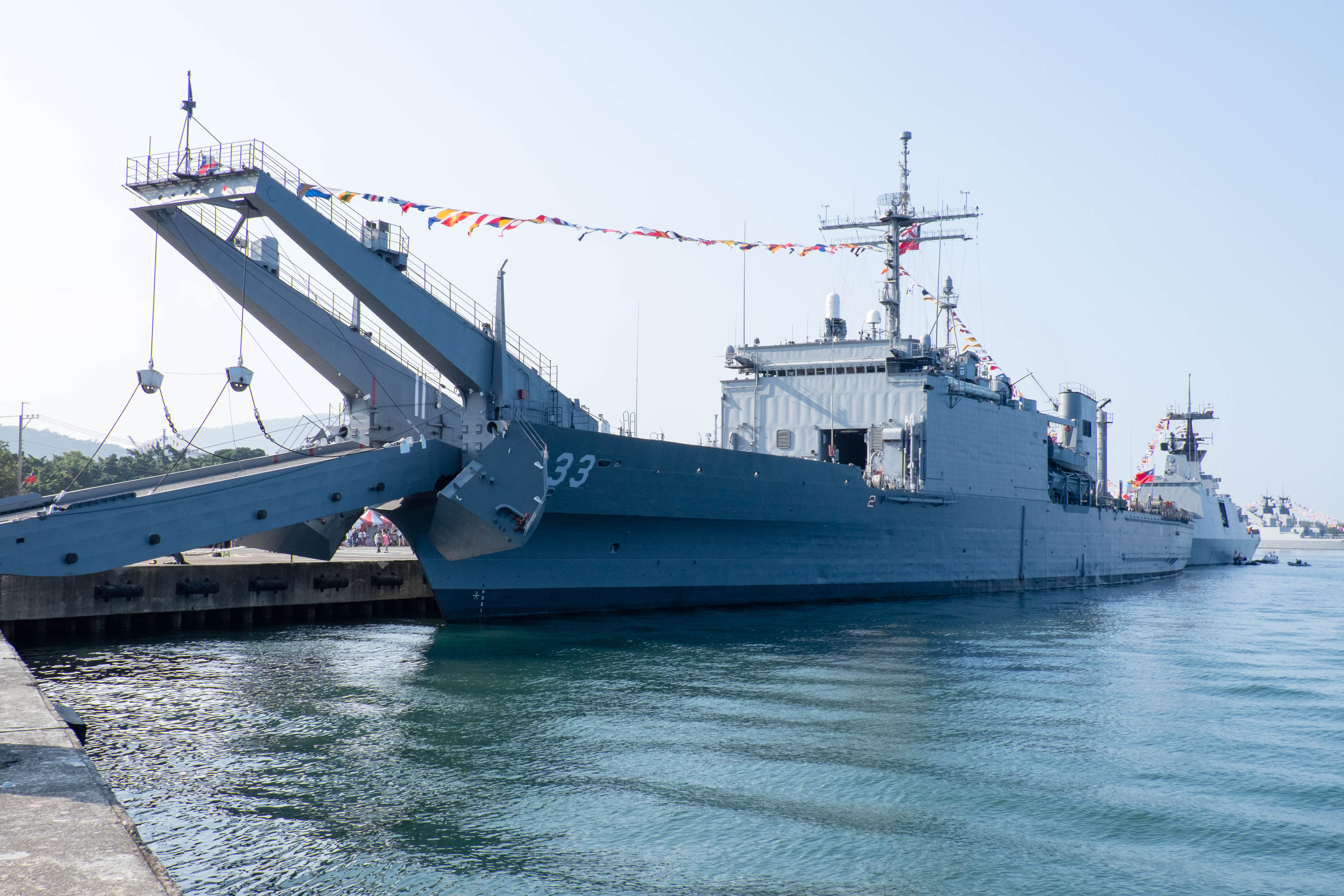
Wu Chang and ROCS Chong Ping at Zuoying Naval Base on 23 November 2014.

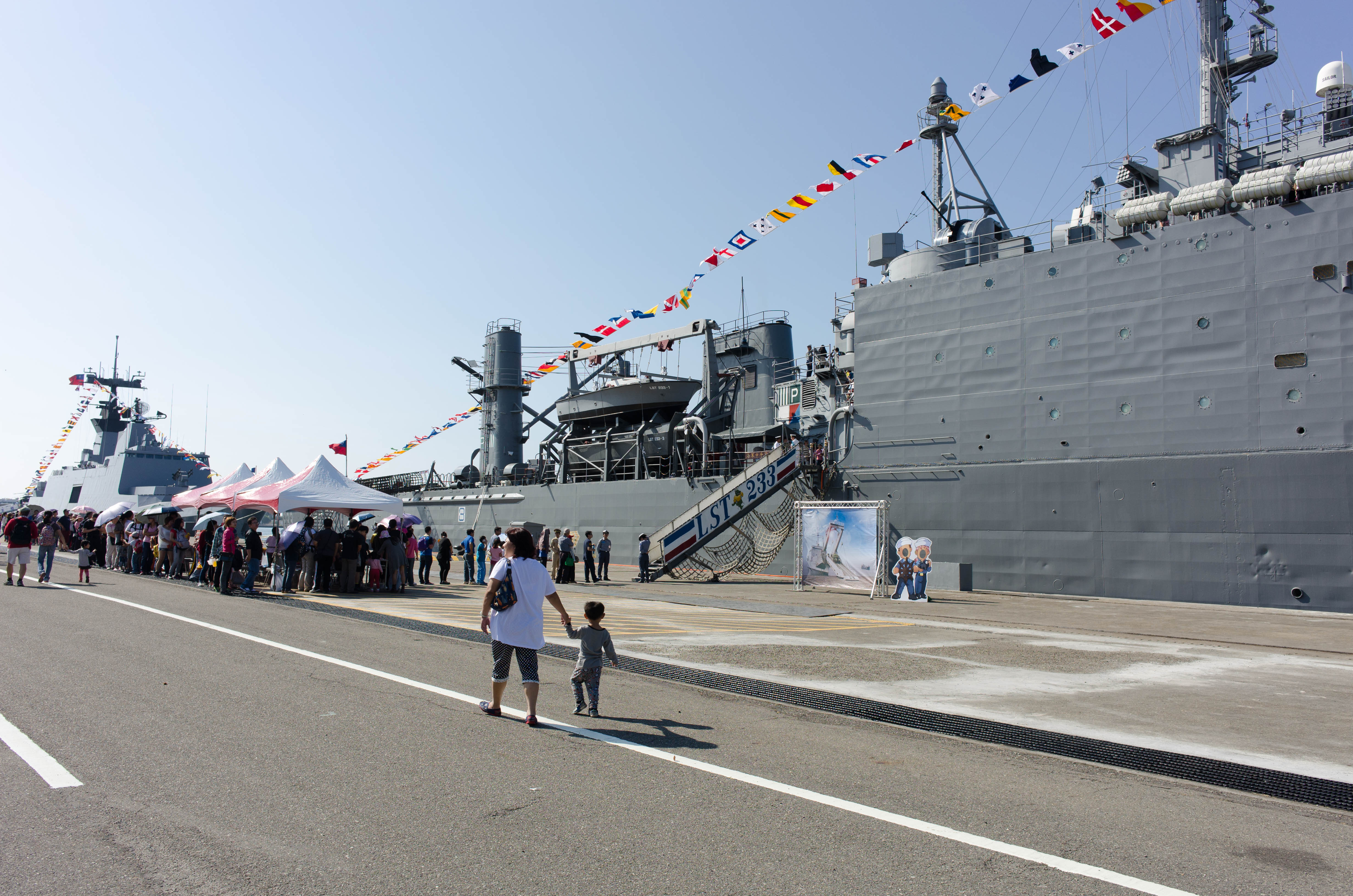
Wu Chang and ROCS Chong Ping at Zuoying Naval Base on 23 November 2014.
