= Kang Ding-class frigate =

Kang Ding class frigate

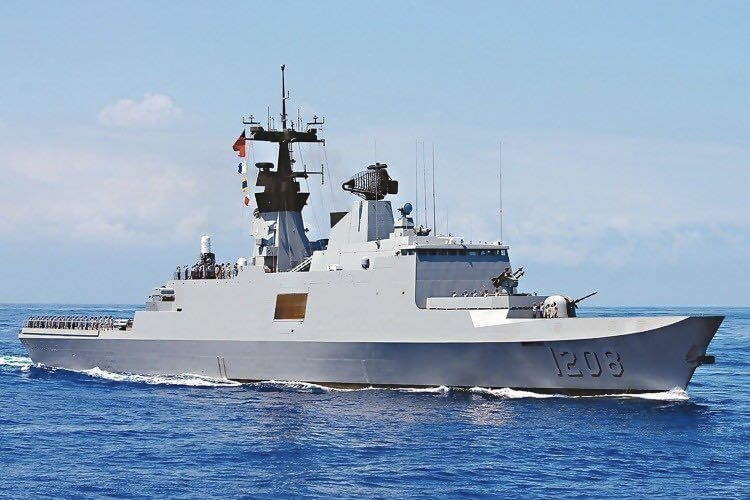
- ROCS Chen De (PFG-1208)

Class overview
- Name: Kang Ding class
- Builders: DNCS
- Operators: Republic of China Navy
- In commission: 1996–present
- Completed: 6
- Active: 6

General characteristics
- Type: General purpose frigate
- Displacement: 3,200 tonnes, 3,800 tonnes fully loaded
- Length: 125 m (410 ft)
- Beam: 15.4 m (51 ft)
- Draught: 4.1 m (13 ft)
- Propulsion: 4 diesel SEMT Pielstick 12PA6V280 STC2, 21,000 hp (16,000 kW)
- Speed: 25 kn (46 km/h; 29 mph)
- Range: 4,000 nmi (7,400 km; 4,600 mi) at 15 kn (28 km/h; 17 mph); 9,000 nmi (17,000 km; 10,000 mi) at 12 kn (22 km/h; 14 mph)
- Endurance: 50 days of food
- Boats & landing craft carried: 2 × ETN boats
- Capacity: 350 tonnes of fuel, 80 m³ of kerosene, 60 tonnes of potable water
- Complement: 12 officers; 68 petty officers; 61 men
- Sensors & processing systems: Thales Tacticos combat data system (was upgraded with a Thales SENIT combat management system); 1 x DRBV-26D Jupiter-II two-dimensional air search radar; 1 x Poseidon Triton G search radar (was upgraded with a Type 997 Artisan radar); 1 x Najir photoelectric director (was upgraded with a SAFRAN PASEO NS Photoelectric tracking system); 2 x Thales Castor-2C I/J fire control radar; Alose Sonar System; Thomson Marconi TSM-2633 Spherion-10B active/passive bow sonar; Thomson Marconi ATAS(V)3 towed active/passive array sonar suite (including VDS active variable depth sonar and Lamproie towed passive array sonar) was upgraded with a Thales CAPTAS-1 Towed Active/Passive Array Sonar
- Armament: ；Before upgrading: Anti-ship; 8 × Hsiung Feng II anti-ship missiles; 1 x MIM-72 Chaparral; 2 x Mark 32 Surface Vessel Torpedo Tubes; Guns; 1 × OTO Melara 76 mm; 2 × Bofors 40 mm L70 guns; CIWS; 1 × Phalanx CIWS; ；After Combat system performance improvement Project: Anti-ship; 8 × Hsiung Feng II anti-ship missile; 8 x cell Hua Yang VLS (32 quad-packed TC-2N missile); 2 x Mark 32 Surface Vessel Torpedo Tubes; Guns; 1 × OTO Melara 76 mm; 2 × Bofors 40 mm L70 gun; CIWS; 1 × Phalanx CIWS
- Armour: On sensitive areas (munition magazine and control centre)
- Aircraft carried: 1 × Sikorsky S-70C (M)
- Aviation facilities: Hangar and helipad

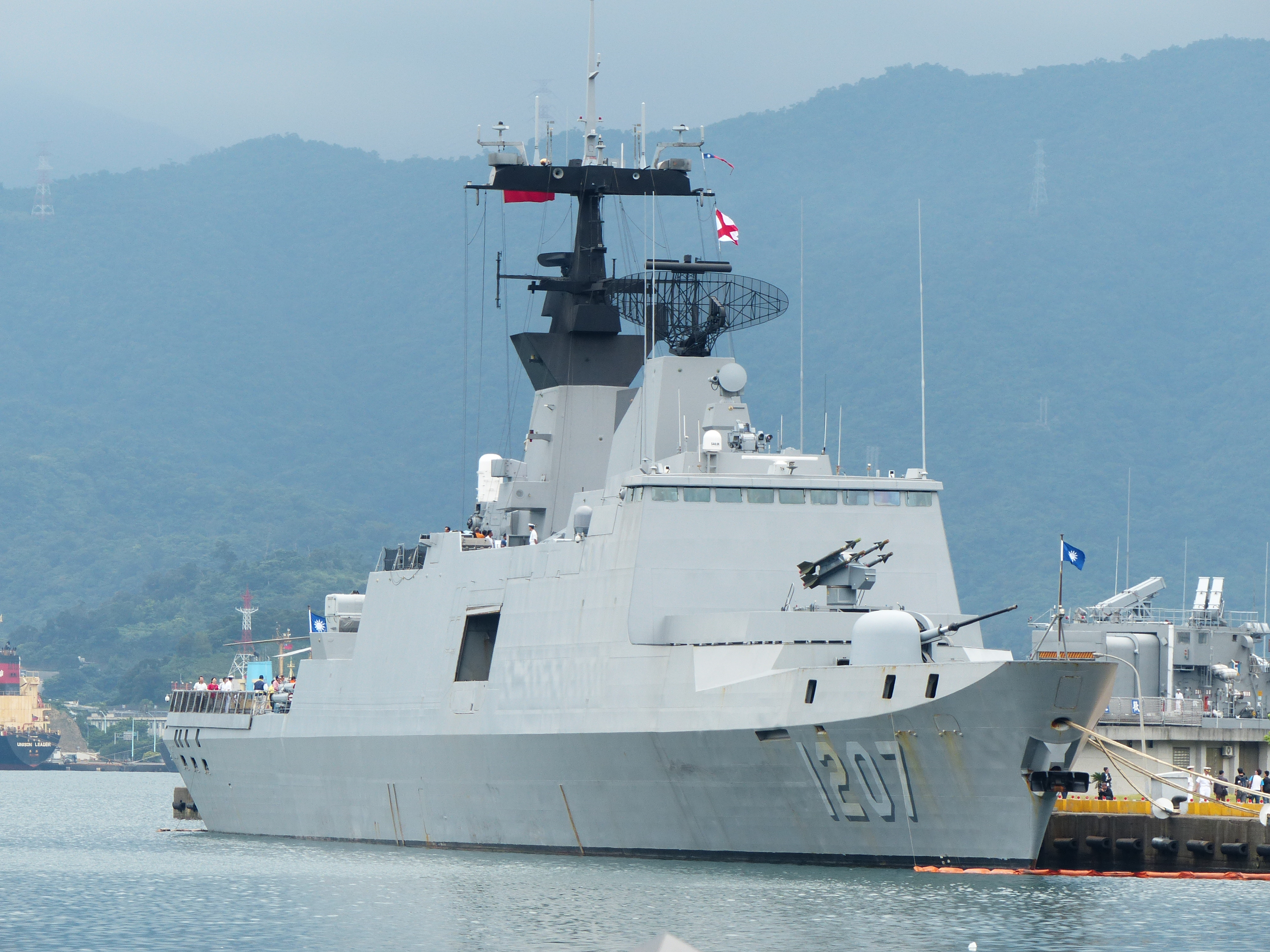
The Taiwanese frigate Wu Chang in 2013

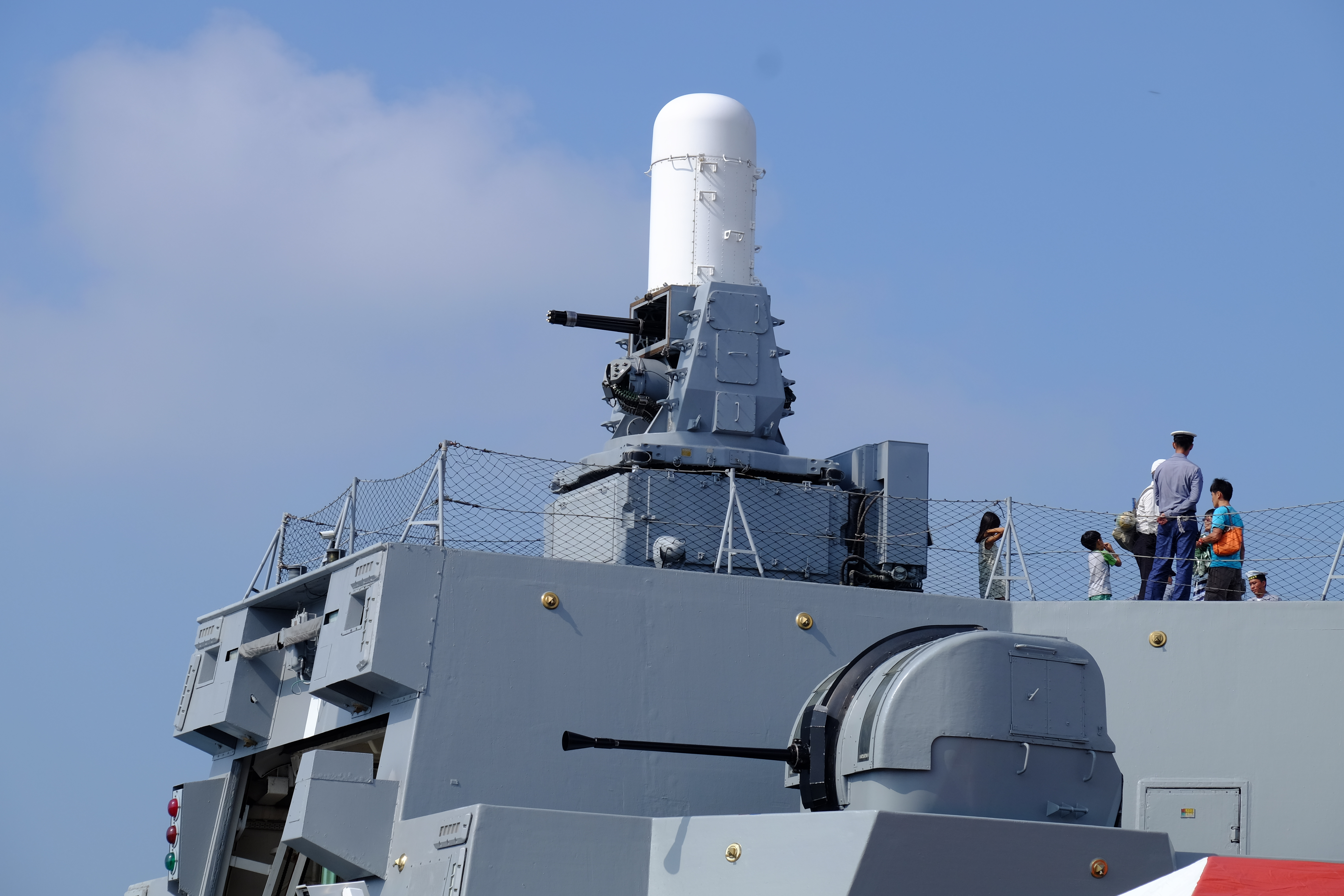
Phalanx CIWS and Bofors 40 mm L70 gun aboard ROCN Di Hua

The Kang Ding-class frigate (Chinese: 康定; lit. 'Darzêdo') is based on the French La Fayette-class frigate design which were built by DCNS for the Republic of China Navy.

== Background and design ==
As the Republic of China's defensive stance is aimed towards the Taiwan Strait, the ROCN is constantly seeking to upgrade its anti-submarine warfare capabilities. The US$1.75 billion agreement with France in the early 1990s was an example of this procurement strategy: the six ships are configured for both anti-submarine warfare (ASW) and surface attack. The Exocet anti-ship missile was replaced by Taiwan-developed Hsiung Feng II missile and the anti-air warfare (AAW) weapon is the Sea Chaparral. The main gun is an Oto Melara 76 mm/62 Mk 75 gun, similar to its Singaporean counterparts, the Formidable-class frigates.

The Sea Chaparral SAM system is considered inadequate for defense against aircraft and anti-ship missiles, so the ROCN plans to upgrade its air-defense capabilities with the indigenous TC-2N in 2020. The missiles will be quad-packed in a vertical launch system for future ROCN surface combatants.

In 2021, it was reported that Taiwan would upgrade the frigates of this class with new air defence and combat systems. The upgrades were to begin in 2022 and would follow on the modernization of the ships' decoy launching systems under a contract awarded in 2020. In January 2025, it was reported that the first upgraded frigate would be due September 2025.

The class's maximum speed is 25 knots (46 km/h; 29 mph) with a maximum range of 4,000 nautical miles (7,400 km; 4,600 mi).

The class's Mk 75 main guns have been upgraded and have an improved firing rate of 100 rounds a minute.

== Combat system performance improvement ==
ROC Navy has allocated NT$43.16 billion for the upgrade of its six Kang Ding-class frigates between FY 2021 and 2029. The modernization program focuses on improving radar and SAM systems to enhance anti-air warfare (AAW), anti-submarine warfare (ASW), and sea control capabilities.

The Kang Ding-class frigate upgrade includes a new Battle Management System (BMS) with improved radars, enhanced air defense, and a vertical launch system (VLS) for missiles. The goal is to increase the frigates' overall combat capability and defensive power.

As part of the upgrade, the Triton-G radar has been replaced with BAE Type 997 Artisan radar. In addition, the Hua Yang vertical launch system (華陽垂直發射系統), developed by National Chung-Shan Institute of Science and Technology (NCSIST), will be installed in the “B” turret position, replacing the RIM-72C Sea Chaparral. The Hua Yang VLS is reportedly capable of launching up to 32 TC-2N missile surface-to-air missiles with a range of 30 km (19 mi).

On July 28, 2025, first upgraded La Fayette-class frigate was spotted departing Kaohsiung port for sea trials. Local ship spotters in Kaohsiung posted photos of Chen De (承德, PFG-1208) leaving port with the assistance of a service vessel. The departure was also captured by the live webcam of Hongmaogang Cultural Park (紅毛港文化園區) at around 10:00 a.m.

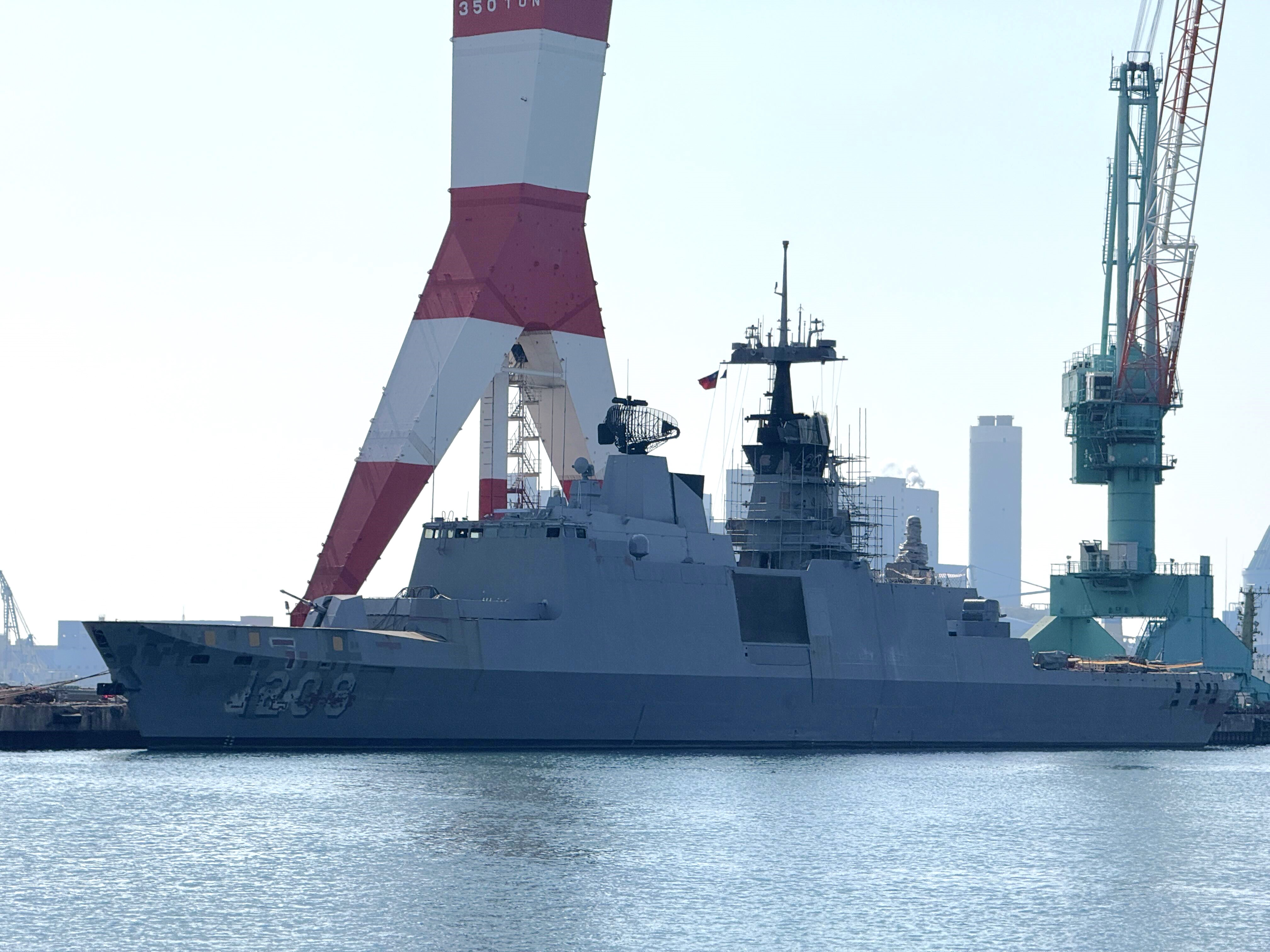
ROCN Kang Ding-class Frigate Combat System Performance Upgrade Project, Photos showing that the upgrade project for the Cheng-de frigate (承德,PFG-1208) was half completed in January 2025.

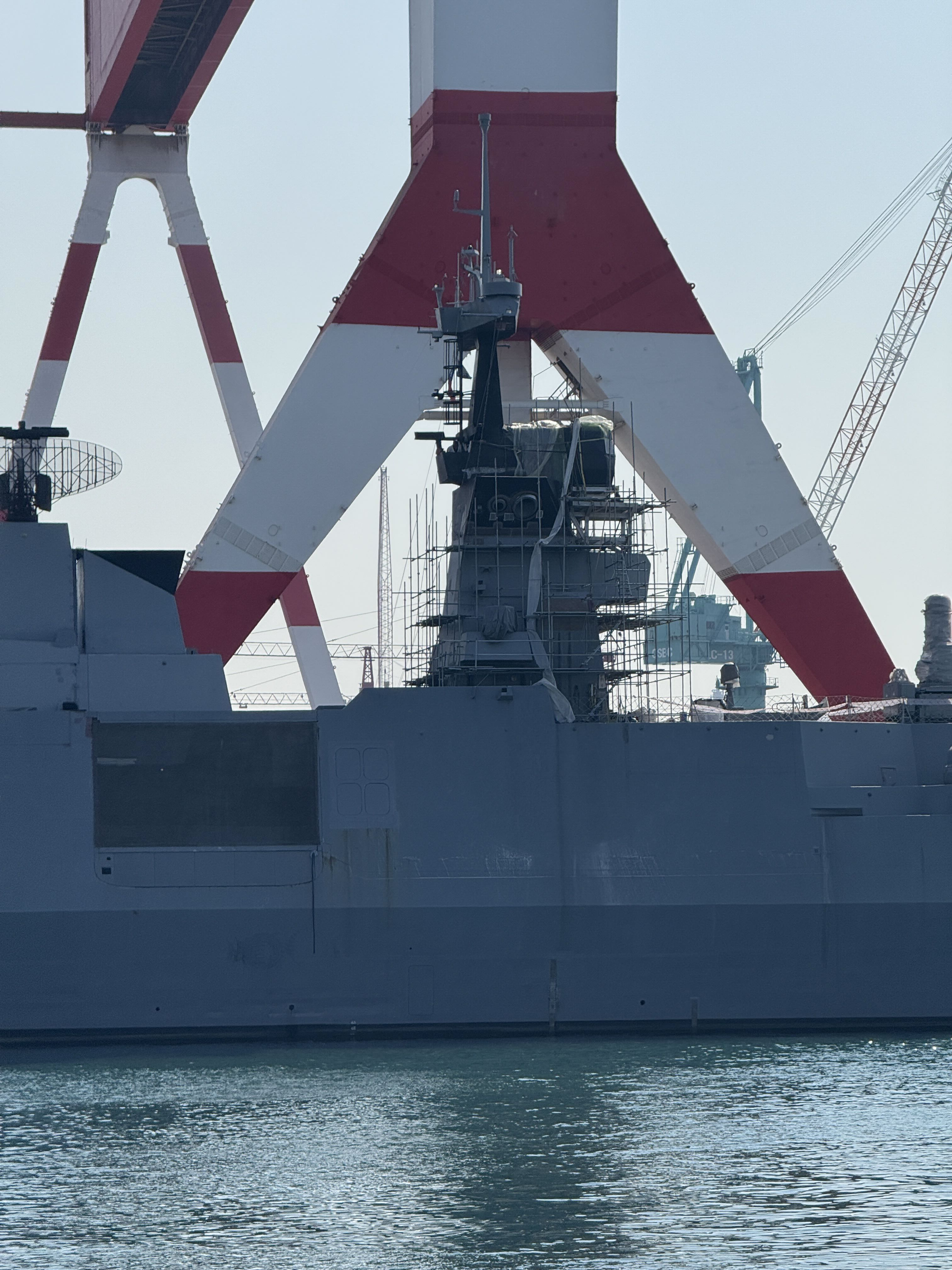
The Poseidon Triton-G radar on the Cheng-de frigate (承德,PFG-1208) has been removed and is being prepared to be replaced with the Type 997 Artisan radar coordinate search radar in January 2025.

== Ships in class ==
Kang Ding class construction data
Hull number	Ship	Builder	Laid down	Launched	Commissioned	Status
PFG-1202	Kang Ding (康定)	DCNS	1993	1994	1996	In active service
PFG-1203	Si Ning (西寧)	DCNS	1994	1994	1996	In active service
PFG-1205	Kun Ming (昆明)	DCNS	1994	1995	1997	In active service
PFG-1206	Di Hua (迪化)	DCNS	1995	1995	1997	In active service
PFG-1207	Wu Chang (武昌)	DCNS	1995	1995	1997	In active service
PFG-1208	Chen De (承德)	DCNS	1995	1996	1998	In active service

== Taiwan frigate scandal ==
The Taiwan frigate deal was a huge political scandal, both in Taiwan and France. Eight people involved in the contract died in unusual and possibly suspicious circumstances. Arms dealer Andrew Wang fled Taiwan to the UK after the body of presumptive whistleblower Captain Yin Ching-feng was found floating in the sea. In 2001, Swiss authorities froze accounts held by Andrew Wang and his family in connection to the scandal.

In 2003, the Taiwanese Navy sued Thomson-CSF (Thales) to recover the alleged $590 million in kickbacks, paid to French and Taiwanese officials, to grease the 1991 La Fayette deal. The money was deposited in Swiss banks, and under the corruption investigation, Swiss authorities froze approx. $730 million in over 60 accounts. In June 2007, the Swiss returned $34 million from frozen accounts to Taiwan, with additional funds pending.

Andrew Wang died in the UK in 2015 and collection efforts continued against his family. In February 2021, the Federal Department of Justice and Police said that Switzerland will restitute nearly US$266 million to Taiwan.

== See also ==
- List of frigate classes in service

Equivalent frigates of the same era

- Karel Doorman class
- Brandenburg class
- Anzac class
- Type 23
- Vasco da Gama class
- Neustrashimy class
- G class
- Halifax class
