= ROCS Kang Ding =

Republic of China Navy frigate

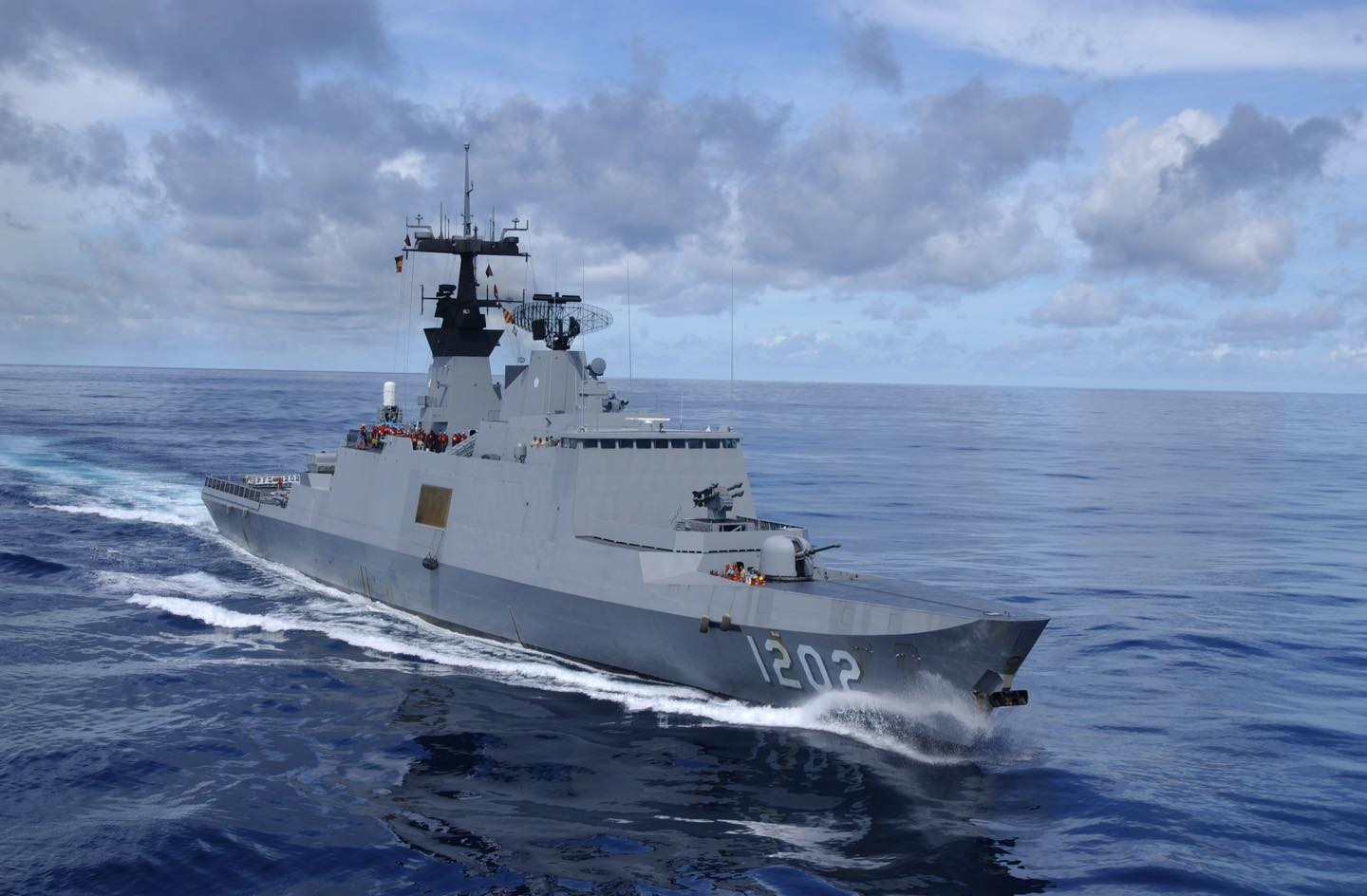
- ROCS Kang Ding

History

Republic of China
- Name: Kang Ding; (康定)
- Namesake: Kang Ding
- Builder: DCNS, Lorient
- Laid down: 1 February 1994
- Launched: 22 March 1994
- Acquired: 18 May 1996
- Commissioned: 24 May 1996
- Home port: Zuoying
- Identification: Pennant number: PFG-1202
- Status: Active

General characteristics
- Class & type: Kang Ding-class frigate
- Displacement: 3,200 tonnes, 3,800 tonnes fully loaded
- Length: 125 m (410 ft)
- Beam: 15.4 m (51 ft)
- Draught: 4.1 m (13 ft)
- Propulsion: 4 diesel SEMT Pielstick 12PA6V280 STC2, 21,000 hp (16,000 kW)
- Speed: 25 kn (46 km/h; 29 mph)
- Range: 4,000 nmi (7,400 km; 4,600 mi) at 15 kn (28 km/h; 17 mph); 9,000 nmi (17,000 km; 10,000 mi) at 12 kn (22 km/h; 14 mph)
- Endurance: 50 days of food
- Boats & landing craft carried: 2 × ETN boats
- Capacity: 350 tonnes of fuel, 80 m³ of kerosene, 60 tonnes of potable water
- Complement: 12 officers; 68 petty officers; 61 men
- Sensors & processing systems: 1 × CastorII fire control radar; 1 x DRBV-26D Jupiter-II two-dimensional air search radar; 1 x Poseidon Triton G search radar; Najir photoelectric director; Alose Sonar System
- Armament: Anti-ship; 8 × Hsiung Feng II anti-ship missiles; 1 x MIM-72 Chaparral; 2 x Mark 32 Surface Vessel Torpedo Tubes; Guns; 1 × OTO Melara 76 mm; 2 × Bofors 40 mm L70 guns; CIWS; 1 × Phalanx CIWS
- Armour: On sensitive areas (munition magazine and control centre)
- Aircraft carried: 1 × Sikorsky S-70C (M)
- Aviation facilities: Hangar and helipad

ROCS Kang Ding (PFG-1202) (Chinese: 康定; lit. 'Darzêdo') is a Kang Ding-class frigate of the Republic of China Navy.

== Development and design ==
As the ROC (Taiwan)'s defensive stance is aimed towards the Taiwan Strait, the ROC Navy is constantly seeking to upgrade its anti-submarine warfare capabilities. The US$1.75 billion agreement with France in the early 1990s was an example of this procurement strategy, the six ships are configured for both ASW and surface attack. The Exocet was replaced by Taiwan-developed Hsiung Feng II anti-ship missile and the AAW weapon is the Sea Chaparral. The main gun is an Oto Melara 76 mm/62 mk 75 gun, similar to its Singaporean counterparts, the Formidable-class frigates. Some problems in the integration of Taiwanese and French systems had been reported. The frigate carries a single Sikorsky S-70C(M)-1/2 ASW helicopter.

The Sea Chaparral SAM system is considered inadequate for defense against aircraft and anti-ship missiles, so the ROC (Taiwan) Navy plans to upgrade its air-defense capabilities with the indigenous TC-2N in 2020. The missiles will be quad-packed in a vertical launch system for future ROCN surface combatants, but a less-risky alternative arrangement of above-deck, fixed oblique launchers is seen as more likely for upgrading these French-built frigates.

== Construction and career ==
Kang Ding was launched on 22 March 1994 at the DCNS in Lorient. Commissioned on 24 May 1996.

=== Mid-Life Upgrade ===
The Kang Ding class was originally intended to be equipped with Aster-15 and Arabel 3D / X-band multi-functional radar. However, due to cost and political difficulties, the upgrade never materialised. However, since 2019 a limited upgrade program has begun. In 2020, ROCN signed a contract to upgrade the DAGIE decoy system to the DAGIE MK2, which will permit the deployment of more advanced decoys and chaff such as SEALEM (RF for distraction and seduction), SEALIR (IR for distraction and seduction) and REM rockets. It was also observed that the Oto Melara 76 mm/62 mk 75 gun was upgraded with a new cupola with angled surfaces for signature reduction. In 2022, a deeper upgrade of the Kang Ding was announced, with the progressive installation of Huayang VLS for the TC-2N missile and upgraded Xunlian command and control systems across the entire fleet by 2025.

== Guang Da Xing No. 28 incident ==
In May 2013, Hong Shicheng, the captain of Guangxing 28, was killed by the Philippine Coast Guard’s fire on a Taiwanese fishing boat, which led to tensions between Taiwan and the Philippines. For this reason, the Southern Regional Patrol Bureau of the Coastal Patrol Administration of the Republic of China Executive Yuan’s Coastal Patrol Bureau announced on May 12. Kang Ding and the Jiyang-class missile frigate, formed a joint fleet to go to the waters around Taiwan and the Philippines to strengthen maritime patrols.

== Gallery ==
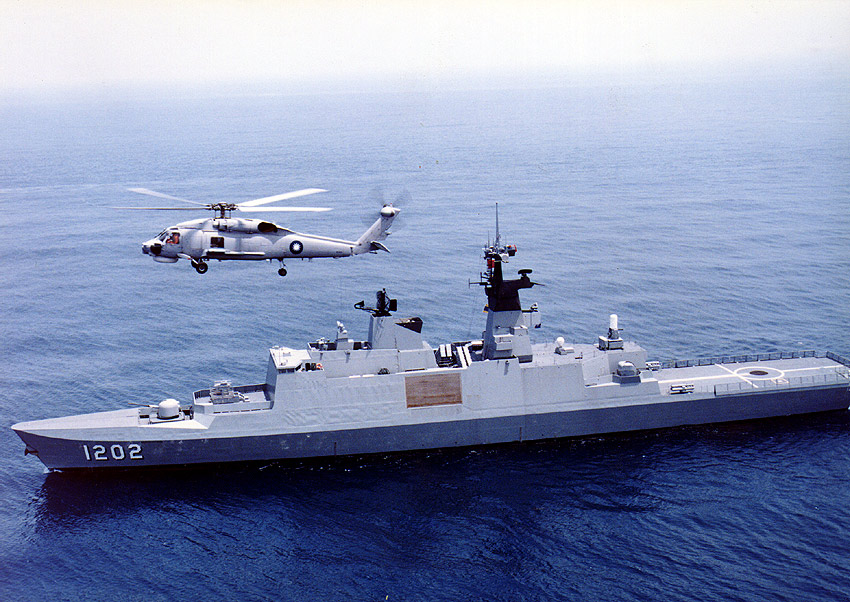
ROCS Kang Ding underway, date unknown.

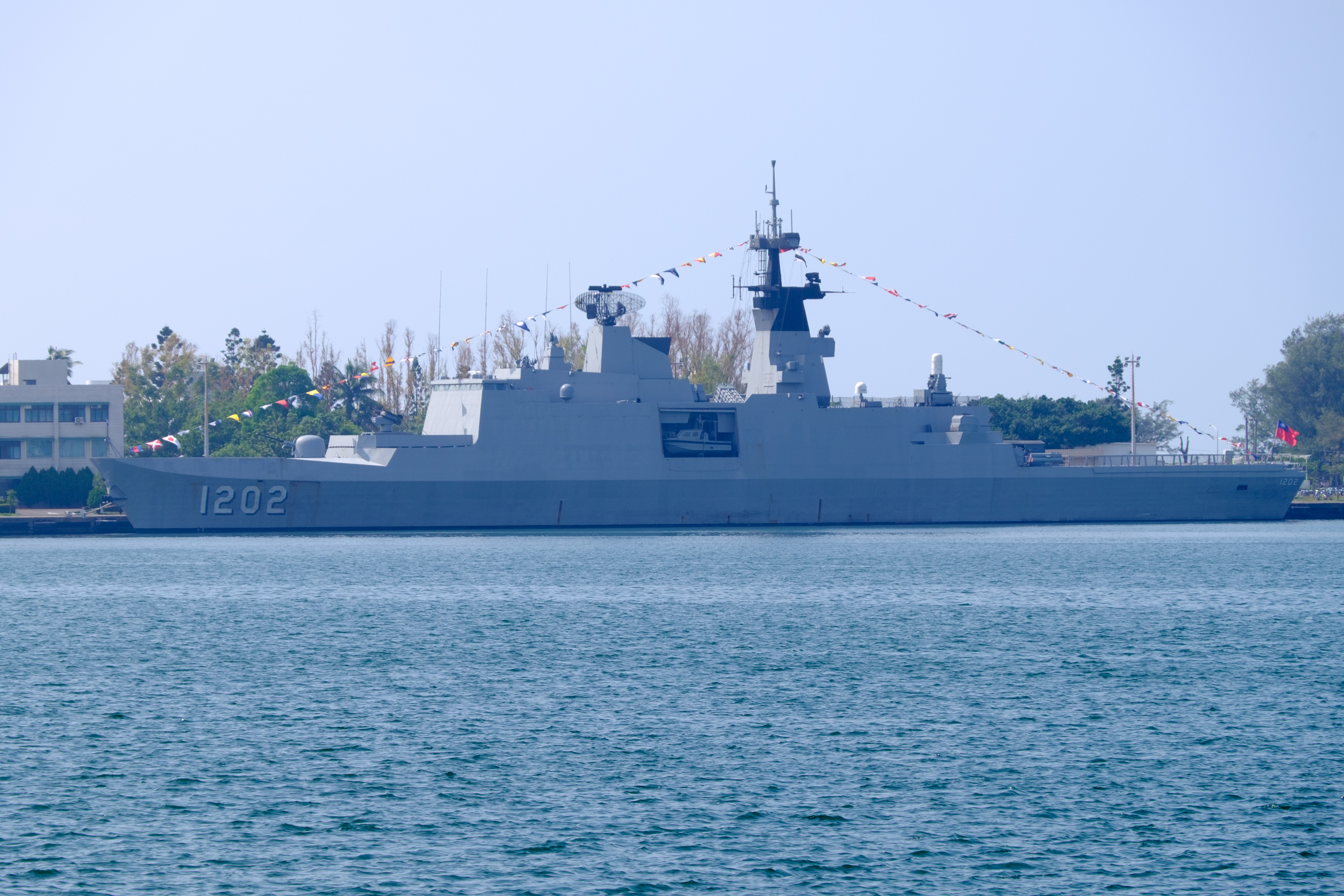
ROCS Kang Ding at Zuoying Naval Base on 24 October 2015.
