= ROCS Wu Yi =

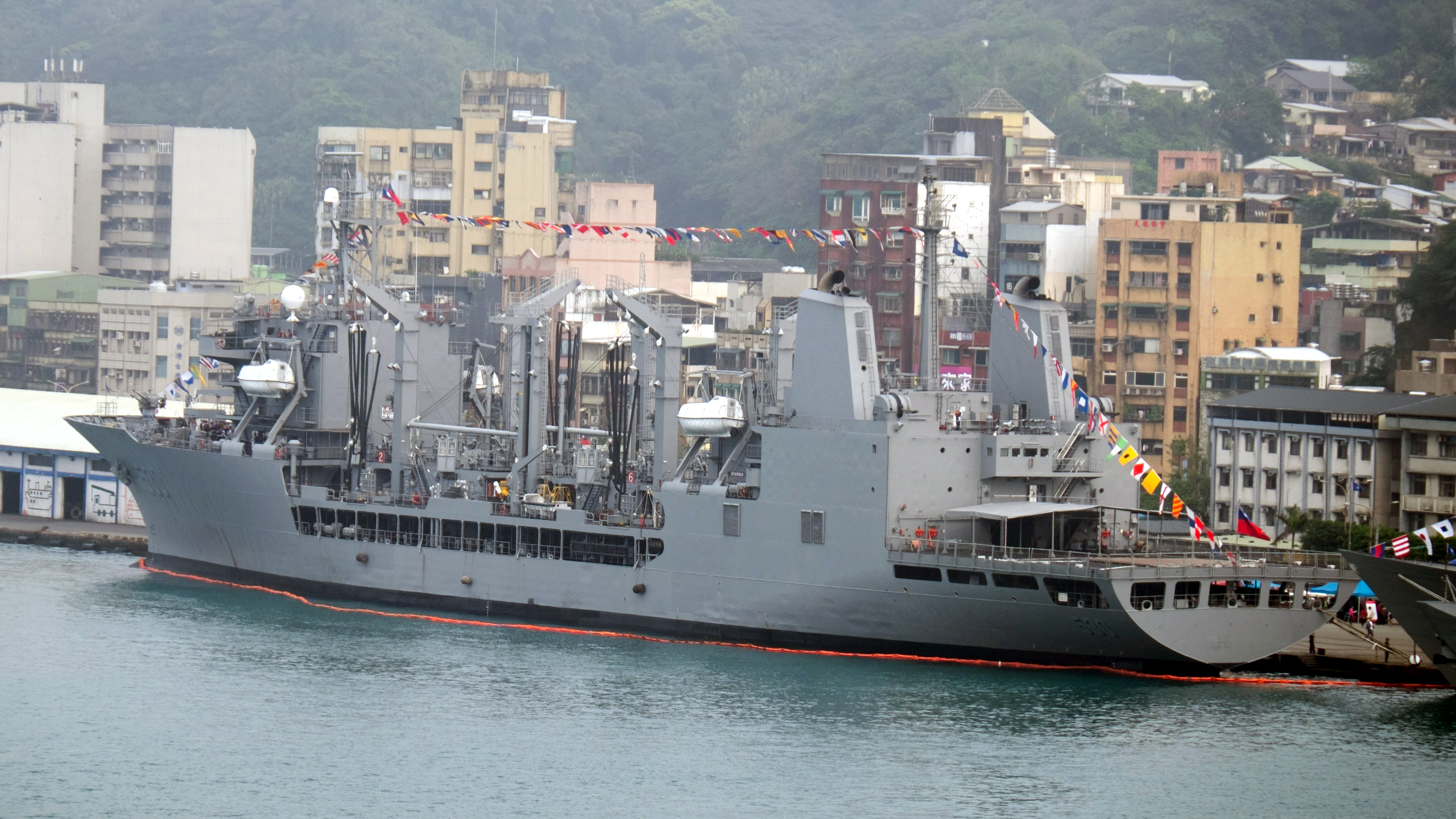
- ROCN Wu Yi at Keelung Naval Pier

Class overview
- Name: Wu Yi
- Builders: CSBC Corporation, Taiwan, Kaoshiung, Taiwan
- Operators: Republic of China Navy
- Succeeded by: Pan Shi-class fast combat support ship
- In service: 1990–present
- Completed: 1
- Active: 1

General characteristics
- Type: Fast combat support ship
- Displacement: 17,000 long tons (17,000 t)
- Length: 532 ft (162.2 m) (oa)
- Beam: 72 ft (21.9 m)
- Draft: 28 ft (8.5 m)
- Propulsion: MHI MAN 14 cylinder low speed turbo diesel
- Armament: 1 x Sea Chaparral; 2 × dual 40 mm guns; 2 x 20 mm cannon; Multiple .50 caliber machine guns; Small arms
- Aircraft carried: SH-60 Seahawk and CH-47 Chinook capable
- Aviation facilities: Landing pad

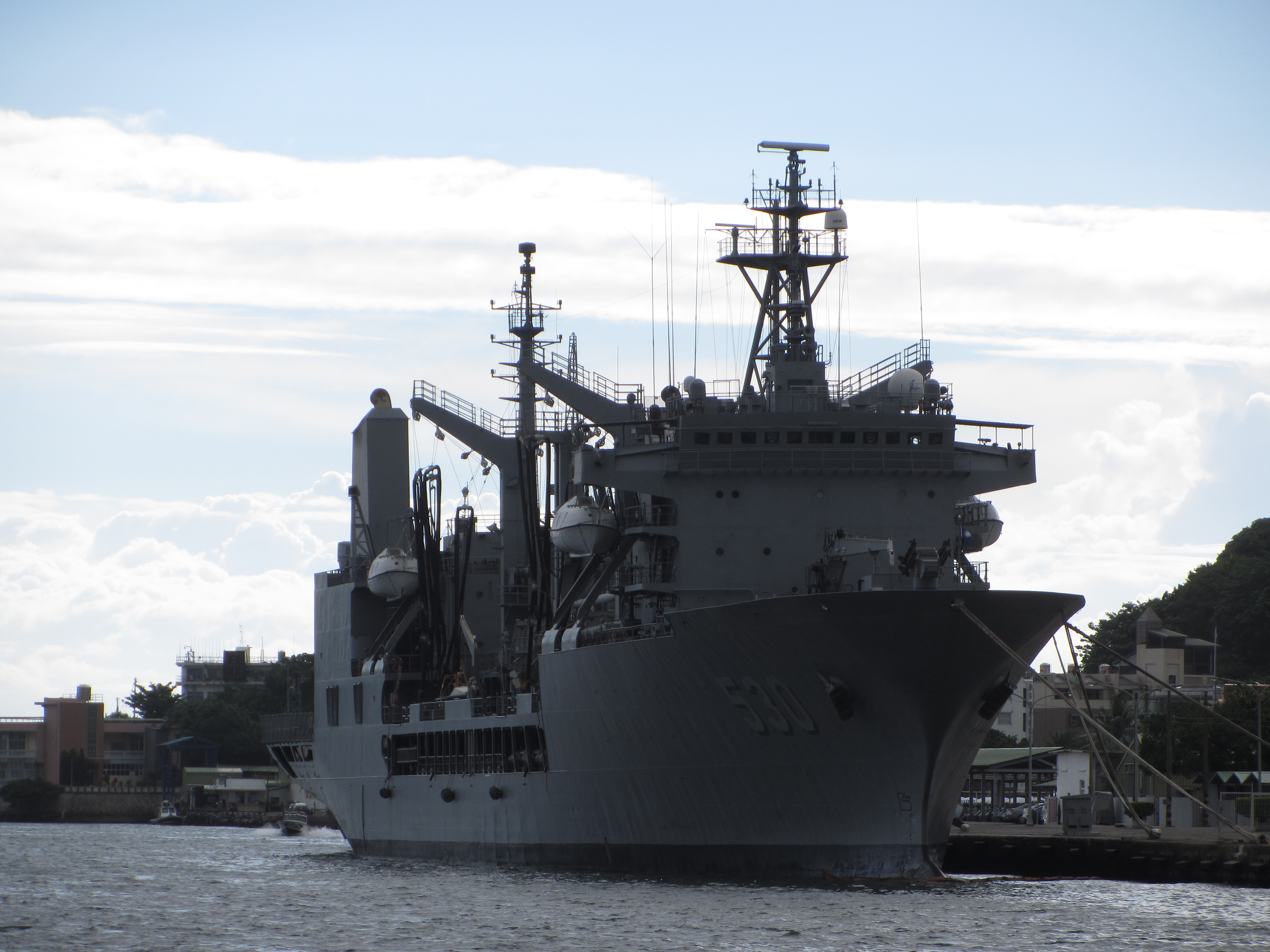
ROCN Wu Yi in Port of Kaohsiung, Taiwan

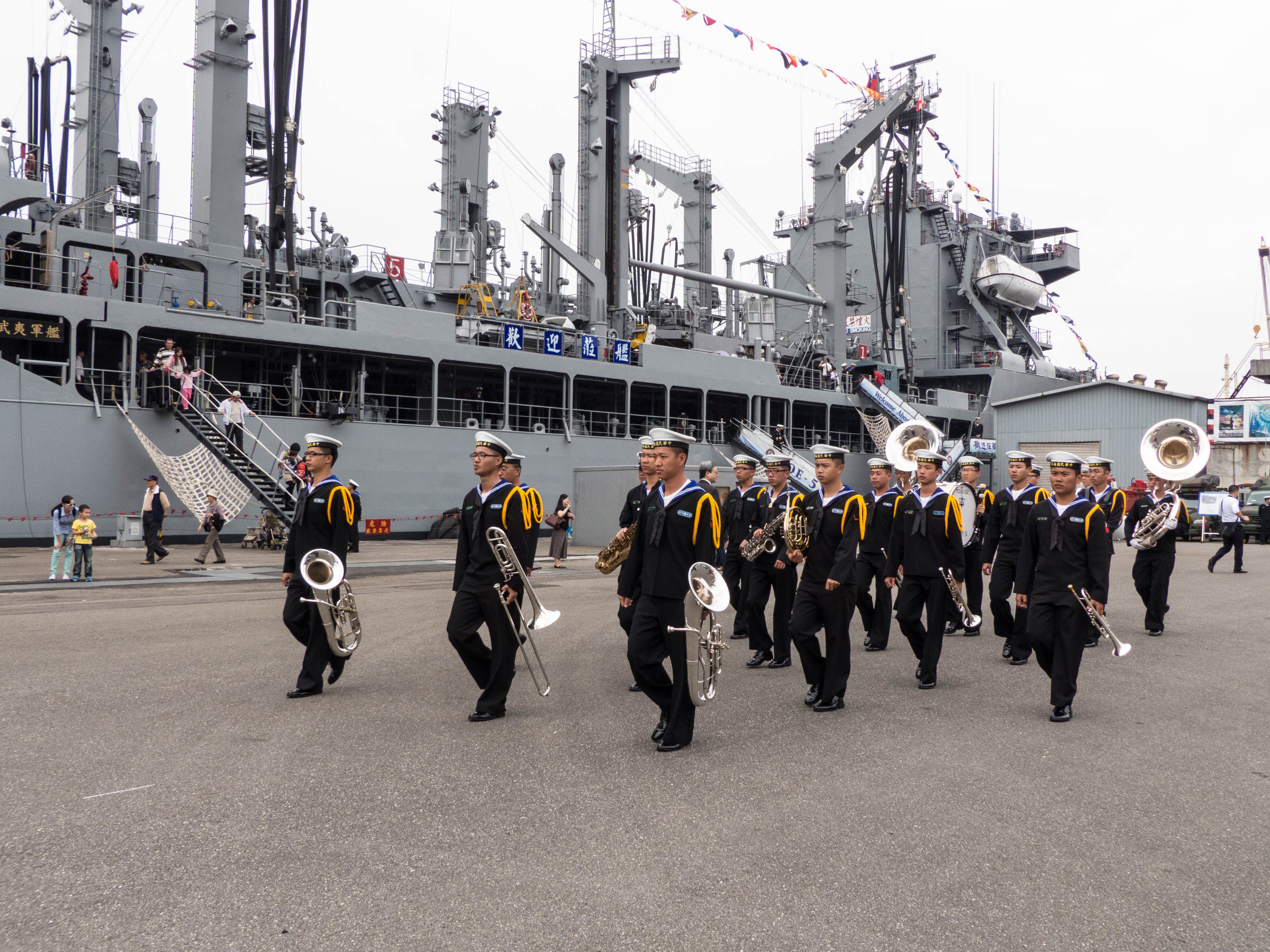
ROCN Band on Keelung Naval Pier in front of Wu Yi

Wu Yi (Chinese: 武夷) is a fleet oiler and logistics ship of the Republic of China Navy (ROCN). She is the only ship of the Wu Yi class. She was the first ship of the ROCN to include accommodations for female officers.

== Design ==
Wu Yi was designed with assistance from the American Rosenblatt & son shipyard and was partially based on the Henry J. Kaiser-class replenishment oiler. She is heavily armed for a fleet oiler, including a Sea Chaparral system.

== History ==
The ship was launched in 1990. Wu Yi has faced significant issues with her hull, machinery, and steering which has limited her ability to fulfill her mission of providing global support for naval task forces.

== See also ==
- Replenishment oiler
