= M48 Chaparral =

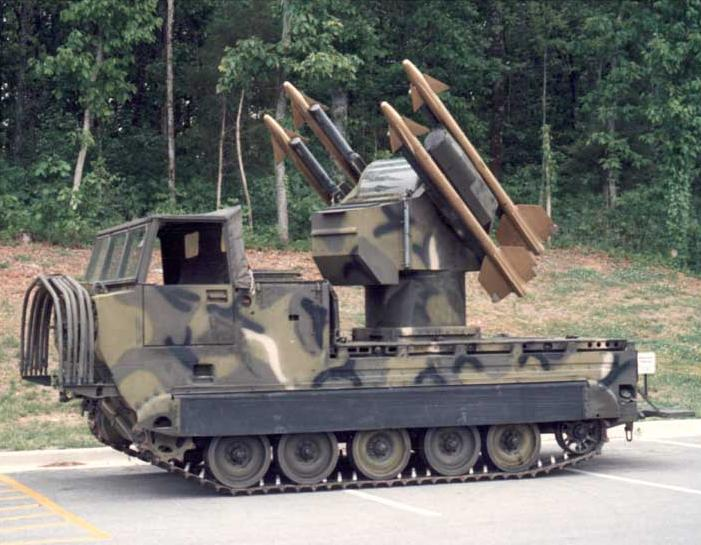
- An M48A2 Chaparral missile launcher
- Type: Mobile SAM system
- Place of origin: United States

Service history
- In service: 1969–98 (US); 1969–present (other countries)
- Used by: See list of present and former operators

Production history
- Designed: 1965
- Manufacturer: Philco-Ford Corporation, Aeronutronic Division
- Unit cost: Launcher vehicle: US$1.5 Million; Missile round: US$80,000
- Produced: 1967
- No. built: ~800
- Variants: See list of variants

Specifications (M48A1 Chaparral)
- Mass: 14,691 lb (6611 kg)
- Length: 238.5 in. (606 cm)
- Width: 105.75 in. (268.6 cm)
- Height: 105.5 in. (268 cm)
- Crew: 5
- Main armament: MIM-72 surface-to-air missile
- Engine: Detroit Diesel 6V53; 202 hp @ 2800 rpm
- Transmission: Allison TX 100-1
- Suspension: Torsion bar
- Fuel capacity: 170 gallons (643 litres)

The M48 Chaparral is an American-made self-propelled surface-to-air missile based on the M113 family of vehicles. The MIM-72 missile is based on the AIM-9 Sidewinder air-to-air missile system. The M48 entered service with the United States Army in 1969 and was phased out as the M48A2 between 1990 and 1998. It was intended to be used along with the M163 VADS, the Vulcan ADS covering short-range short-time engagements, and the Chaparral for longer range use.

== Development ==
=== Mauler ===
Starting in 1959 the U.S. Army MICOM (Missile Command) began development of an ambitious anti-aircraft missile system under their "Forward Area Air Defense" (FAAD) program. Known as the MIM-46 Mauler, it was based on a modified M113 chassis carrying a large rotating A-frame rack on top with nine missiles and both long-range search and shorter-range tracking radars. Operation was to be almost entirely automatic, with the operators simply selecting targets from the search radar's display and then pressing "fire". The entire engagement would be handled by the fire control computer.

In testing, Mauler proved to have numerous problems. Many of these were relatively minor, including problems with the rocket motors or fins on the airframe. Others, like problems with the fire control and guidance systems, appeared to be more difficult to solve. Army strategy from the mid-1950s PENTANA study was based on having embedded mobile anti-aircraft capability, and Mauler's delays put this entire program in question. More worrying, a new generation of Soviet attack aircraft was coming into service. For both of these reasons the Mauler program was scaled back in 1963 and alternatives were studied.

=== IFAAD ===
MICOM was directed to study whether or not the Navy's AIM-9D Sidewinder missile could be adapted for the ground-to-air role. Since the Sidewinder was guided by an infrared seeker, it would not be confused by ground clutter like the radar-guided Mauler. On the downside, the missile required some time to "lock on", and the current generation seekers were only able to lock onto the tail of an aircraft. MICOM's report was cautiously optimistic, concluding that the Sidewinder could be adapted very quickly, although it would have limited capability.

A new concept, the "Interim Forward Area Air Defense" (IFAAD) evolved around the Sidewinder. The main concern was that at shorter distances the missile would not have time to lock onto the target before it flew out of range, so to serve this need a second vehicle based around the M61 Vulcan cannon was specified. Both would be aimed manually, eliminating the delay needed for a fire control system to develop a "solution". Neither vehicle concept had room for a search radar, so a separate radar system using a datalink was developed for this role.

The studies were completed in 1965 and the Chaparral program was begun. The first XMIM-72A missiles were delivered to the US Army in 1967. Ford developed the M730 vehicle, adapted from the M548, itself one of the many versions of the widely used M113. The first Chaparral battalion was deployed in May 1969.

A small target-acquisition area radar, the AN/MPQ-49 Forward Area Alerting Radar (FAAR), was developed in 1966 to support the Chaparral/Vulcan system, although the FAAR is transported by the Gama Goat and thus not suitable for use in the front line.

== Description ==
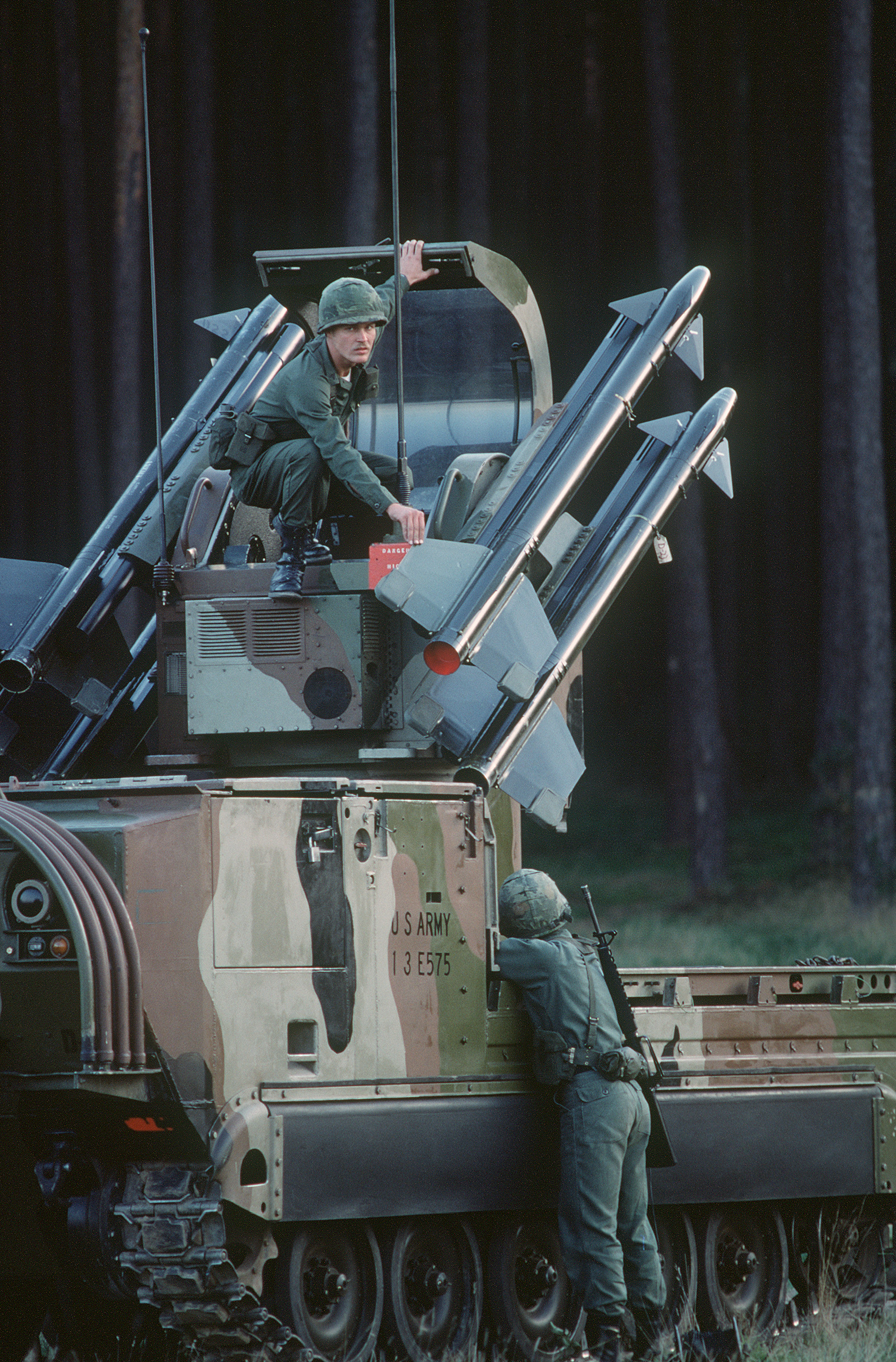
US Army Chaparral self-propelled anti-aircraft vehicle in 1977

The complete system was known as the M48 Chaparral Intercept-Aerial Guided Missile System, composed of the M54 Launching Station atop the M730 Carrier, an M113A1 variant. The M730A1 had suspension and cooling system improvements, while the M730A2 incorporated the more powerful, turbocharged engine and revised transmission (which were known as the Reliability Improvement of Selected Equipment (RISE) upgrade) as used by the M113A3.

The launcher was capable of a full 360 degrees traverse and +90/-9 degrees of elevation. Four missiles were carried on the launch rails, with eight extras stored below the launcher with their fins and wings removed. The gunner sat between the missile pairs on the mount, aiming using a simple reflex sight. An auxiliary power unit provides the necessary power to run the mount, and a cryonic air cooler provides the missile seekers with the necessary cooling. On early models the power unit was a two-cylinder 10 horsepower gasoline engine, though it was replaced with a more powerful 30 hp diesel engine in the early 1980s, greatly improving available power while simultaneously allowing fuel compatibility with the main engine.

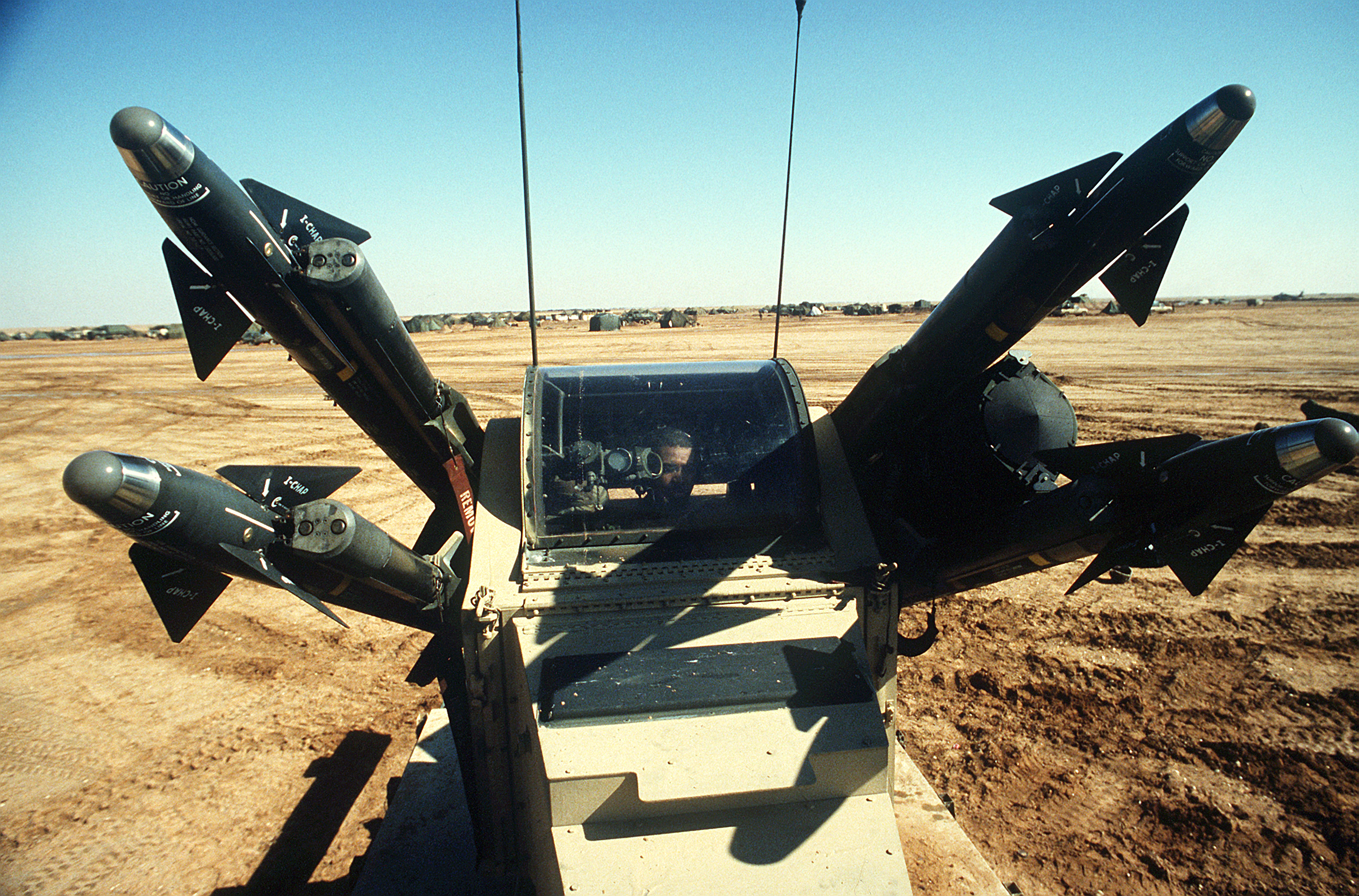
An M48A2 Chaparral missile system deployed for Operation Desert Storm

In 1984, a FLIR unit was installed to give the system an all-weather/night capability.

The MIM-72A missile was based on the AIM-9D Sidewinder. The main difference is that to reduce drag only two of the fins on the MIM-72A have rollerons, the other two having been replaced by fixed thin fins. The MIM-72's MK 50 solid-fuel rocket motor was essentially identical to the MK 36 MOD 5 used in the AIM-9D Sidewinder.

MIM-72B was a training missile with the radar fuze replaced with an IR model for use against target drones.

1974 saw the introduction of the MIM-72C, used the advanced AN/DAW-1B seeker with all-aspect capability, as well as a new doppler radar fuze and M250 blast-frag warhead. The fuze and warhead were adapted from the earlier Mauler program. C models were deployed between 1976 and 1981, reaching operational status in 1978.

A naval version of the missile was also developed, based on the C version of the missile – the RIM-72C Sea Chaparral. This was not adopted by the U.S. Navy, however it was exported to Taiwan.

MIM-72D was built for export, combining the seeker of the "A" with the improved M250 warhead.

MIM-72E retrofitted "C" of the late 1970s using the M121 smokeless motor, which greatly reduced the smoke generated on firing, thus allowing easier follow-up shots and making it harder for enemy aircraft to find the launch site.

MIM-72F was an export model, and is virtually identical to the MIM-72E, just being newly built instead of retrofitted.

MIM-72G was the final upgrade to the system. The rosette scan seeker of the Stinger POST was adapted to the Chaparral by Ford in a program beginning in 1980. The improved AN/DAW-2 seeker offered a large field of view, as well as the ability to reject most flares and countermeasures. All existing missiles had been updated by the late 1980s and new-build G models followed between 1990 and 1991. By this point in time the system was already being removed from regular Army service, and being handed over to the National Guard.

MIM-72H refers to an export version of the MIM-72F

MIM-72J is an MIM-72G with a downgraded guidance and control section, and was also intended for export.

Two training missiles, the Trainer M30 and Trainer M33, were also built. Used for loading practice, these trainers used inert dummy components and could not be launched. For tracking practice, the Trainers could be fitted with tactical seekers. The M30 replicated the live "A" using the original Mk28 seeker head, while the M33 replicated "C" and later and was fitted with the AN/DAW series of seekers

== Variants ==
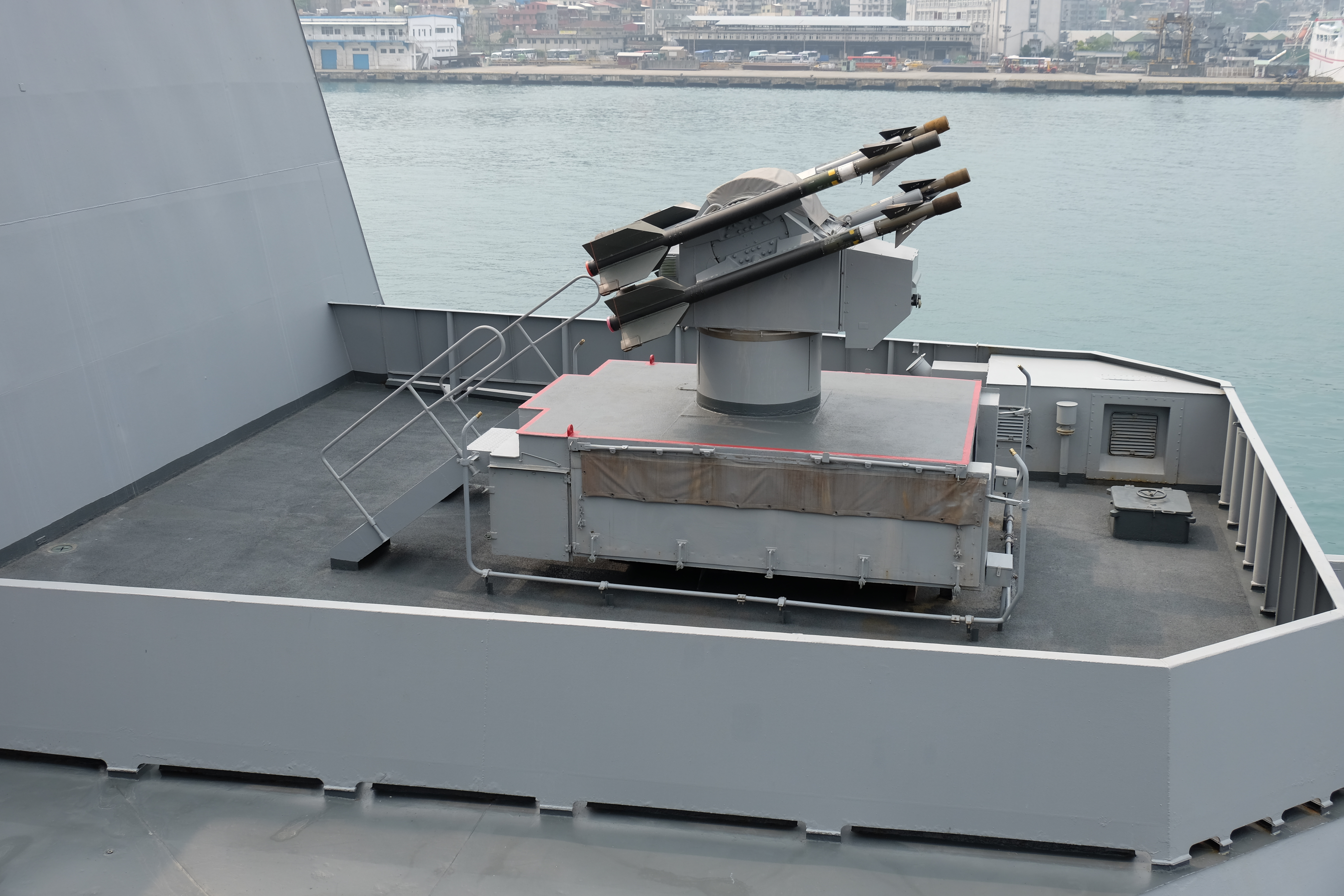
RIM-72C Launcher Mounted on ROCN Si Ning (PFG-1203)

=== Missiles ===
- MIM-72A Chaparral Original production missile.
- MIM-72B Training missile.
- MIM-72C Improved Chaparral. Featuring an improved AN/DAW-1 guidance section, M817 directional doppler fuze and a M250 blast-fragmentation warhead.
  - RIM-72C Sea Chaparral. Naval version - Evaluated but not deployed by the US Navy. Adopted by Taiwan.
- MIM-72D Export version not used by the United States
- MIM-72E MIM-72C missiles retrofitted with a new M121 smokeless motor.
- MIM-72F Newly built export version of the MIM-72E
- MIM-72G Fitted with a new AN/DAW-2 based on the seeker in the FIM-92 Stinger POST giving improved resistance to countermeasures. This was retrofitted to all Chaparral missiles during the late 1980s. New missiles were produced between 1990 and 1991.
- MIM-72H Export model of MIM-72F.
- MIM-72J A downgraded export model of MIM-72G.
- M30 Inert training missile based on MIM-72A
- M33 Inert training version of MIM-72C

== Operators ==
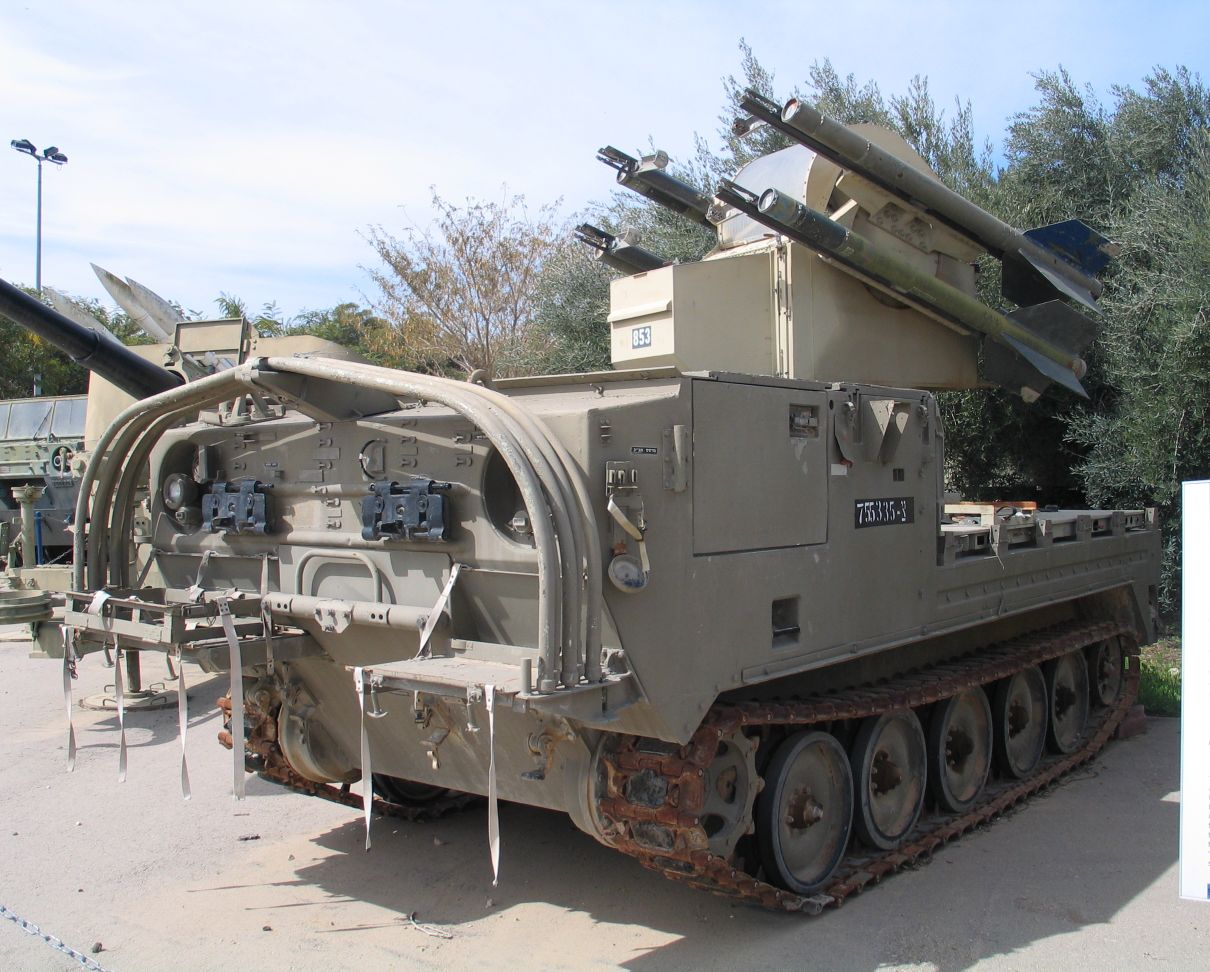
M48 operated by Israel (known as Drakon in IDF service).

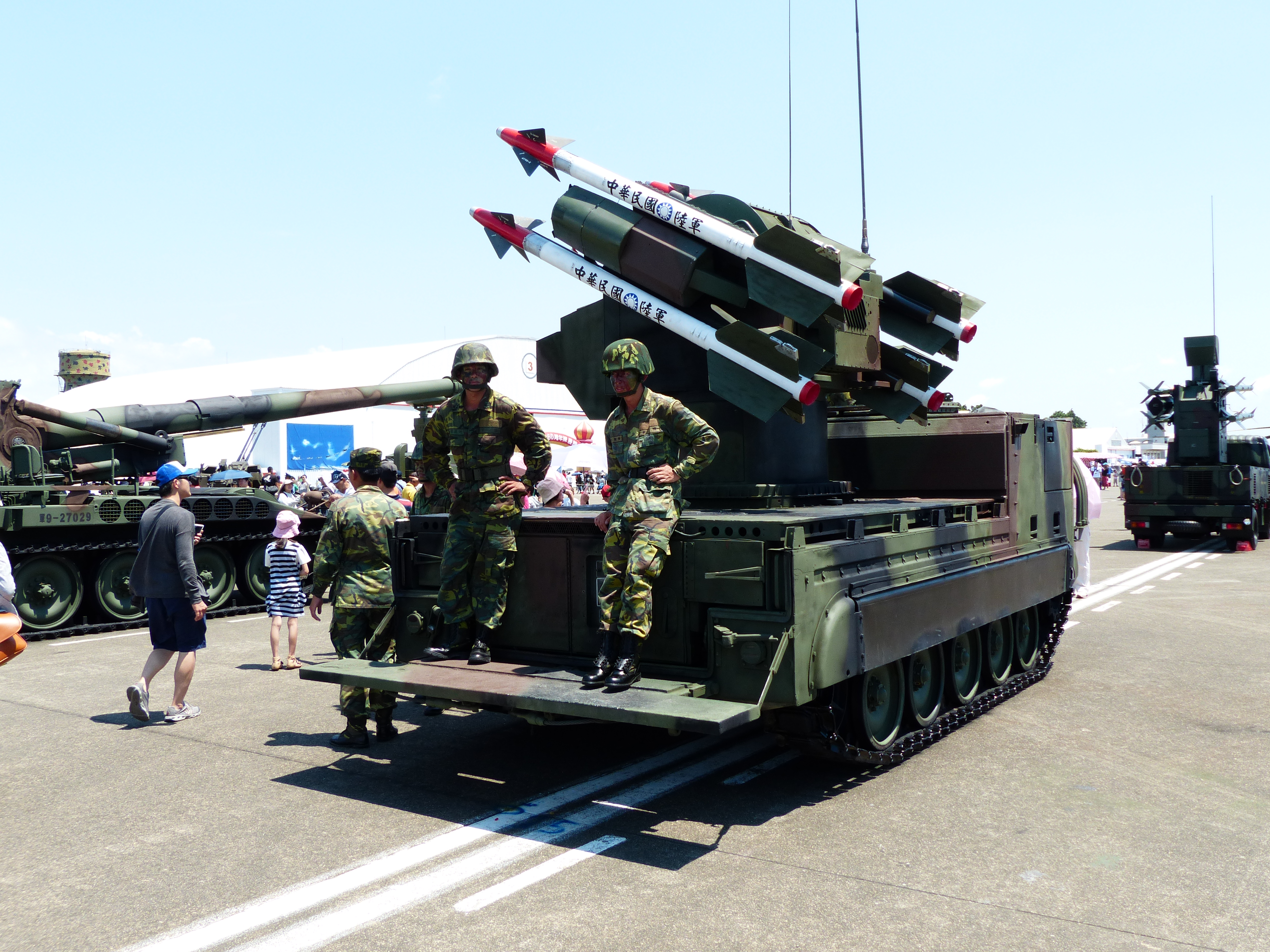
Taiwanese M48A2 on display at Tainan Air Force Base

- Egypt - 50 M-48A3 Chaparral as for 2024, having been upgraded between 2019 and 2020.
- Morocco - 37 M-48 Chaparral as for 2024
- Republic of China
  - Republic of China Army and Republic of China Marine Corps – built on M113 Chassis. Removed from service in 2025.
  - Republic of China Navy – installed on Kang Ding class frigate, Wu Yi-class fleet oiler, and Pan Shi-class fast combat support ship
- Tunisia - 26 M-48 Chaparral as for 2024

=== Former ===
- Chile - 28 units purchased in the 1980s. Phased out as of 2024.
- Ecuador
- Israel - An Israeli Chaparral shot down a Syrian MiG-17 over the Golan Heights on 16 May 1974. Israel also deployed Chaparrals during the 1982 Lebanon War. Removed from service by 2003.
- Portugal - 34 systems received (23 in the A3 version and 11 in the A2 version). Removed from service by 2018
- United States - United States Army – All units removed from service by 1997.

== General characteristics ==
- Length: 2.90 m (9 ft 6 in)
- Wingspan: 63.0 cm (24.8 in)
- Diameter: 127 mm (5.0 in)
- Launch weight: 86 kg (190 lb)
- Speed: Mach 1.5
- Range: 180 m (590 ft) (Minimum arming distance) to 5 km (3.1 mi)
- Altitude: 25 to 4,000 m (80 to 10,000 ft)
- Guidance:
  - MIM-72A: Mk 28 seeker, Passive infra-red tail chase only.
  - MIM-72C/E: AN/DAW-1B all-aspect
  - MIM-72G: AN/DAW-2 rosette scan
- Motor :
  - MIM-72A/B/C/D/F: MK 50 solid-fuel rocket motor (12.2 kN (2,700 lbf)) for 4.7 s
  - MIM-72E/G: M121 solid-fuel motor
- Warhead:
  - MIM-72A: 12.2 kg (27 lb) MK 48 Continuous-rod warhead with 6.1 lb (2.8 kg) PBXN-1 explosive
  - MIM-72C and later: 25 lb (11 kg) M250 blast-frag warhead with 6.6 lb (3.0 kg) Octol explosive

== See also ==
- FIM-92 Stinger – (United States)
- FIM-43 Redeye – (United States)
- AN/TWQ-1 Avenger – (United States)
- Rapier (missile) – (United Kingdom)
- 9K31 Strela-1 – (Soviet Union)
