= USS LST-578 =

LST-542-class landing ship tank

History

United States
- Name: LST-578
- Builder: Missouri Valley Bridge and Iron Co., Evansville
- Laid down: 4 May 1944
- Launched: 19 June 1944
- Sponsored by: Mrs. A. B. Morris
- Commissioned: 15 July 1944
- Decommissioned: 22 March 1946
- Renamed: Q099; T-LST-578
- Stricken: 1958
- Identification: Callsign: NEXI
- Honors and awards: See Awards
- Fate: Transferred to the Republic of China, 1958

Taiwan
- Name: Chung Pang; (中邦)
- Acquired: 21 September 1958
- Commissioned: 21 September 1958
- Decommissioned: 23 August 2018
- Home port: Kaohsiung
- Identification: Pennant number: LST-230
- Fate: Expended as target ship
- Status: Decommissioned

General characteristics
- Class & type: LST-542-class tank landing ship
- Displacement: 1,625 long tons (1,651 t) light; 4,080 long tons (4,145 t) full
- Length: 328 ft (100 m)
- Beam: 50 ft (15 m)
- Draft: Unloaded : 2 ft 4 in (0.71 m) forward; 7 ft 6 in (2.29 m) aft; Loaded : 8 ft 2 in (2.49 m) forward; 14 ft 1 in (4.29 m) aft
- Propulsion: 2 × General Motors 12-567 diesel engines, two shafts, twin rudders
- Speed: 12 knots (22 km/h; 14 mph)
- Boats & landing craft carried: 2 × LCVPs
- Troops: 16 officers, 147 enlisted men
- Complement: 7 officers, 104 enlisted men
- Armament: 8 × 40 mm guns; 12 × 20 mm guns

USS LST-578 was a LST-542-class tank landing ship in the United States Navy during World War II. She was transferred to the Republic of China Navy as ROCS Chung Pang (LST-230).

== Construction and commissioning ==
LST-578 was laid down on 5 May 1945 at Chicago Bridge and Iron Company, Seneca, Illinois. Launched on 8 June 1945 and commissioned on 30 June 1945.

=== Service in United States Navy ===
During World War II, LST-578 was assigned to the Asiatic-Pacific theater. She then participated in the Leyte landings from 5 to 18 November 1944. In 1945, she took part in the Lingayen Gulf landing from 4 to 17 January, the Mindanao Island landing from 10 to 18 March, 24 March to 14 April and 17 to 23 April 1945. She was assigned to occupation and China from 20 October 1945 to 29 June 1946.

She was decommissioned on 1 July 1946 and assigned to Commander Naval Forces Far East (COMNAVFE) Shipping Control Authority for Japan (SCAJAP), redesignated Q099. She was later transferred to the Military Sea Transportation Service (MSTS), 31 March 1952, placed in service as USNS T-LST-578. She was struck from the Naval Register on 6 February 1956 after she was transferred to the Republic of China and renamed Chung Pang (LST-230).

=== Service in Republic of China Navy ===
On 23 August 2018, she was decommissioned.

On 29 July 2019, her together with her sister ship Chung Kuang served as a target ship for multiple F-16s fired Harpoon missiles and was hit.

In the exercise of Han Kuang 36 on July 15, 2020, she served as a target ship for Harpoon missiles. She refused to sink during the exercise. After the exercise ended on July 17, she was towed back to the naval pier in Qijin, Kaohsiung. The side of the hull has at least two holes visible from the missiles.

== Awards ==
LST-578 have earned the following awards:

- American Campaign Medal
- Asiatic-Pacific Campaign Medal (3 battle stars)
- World War II Victory Medal
- Navy Occupation Service Medal (with Asia clasp)
- Philippine Presidential Unit Citation
- Philippine Liberation Medal (2 battle stars)

== Gallery ==
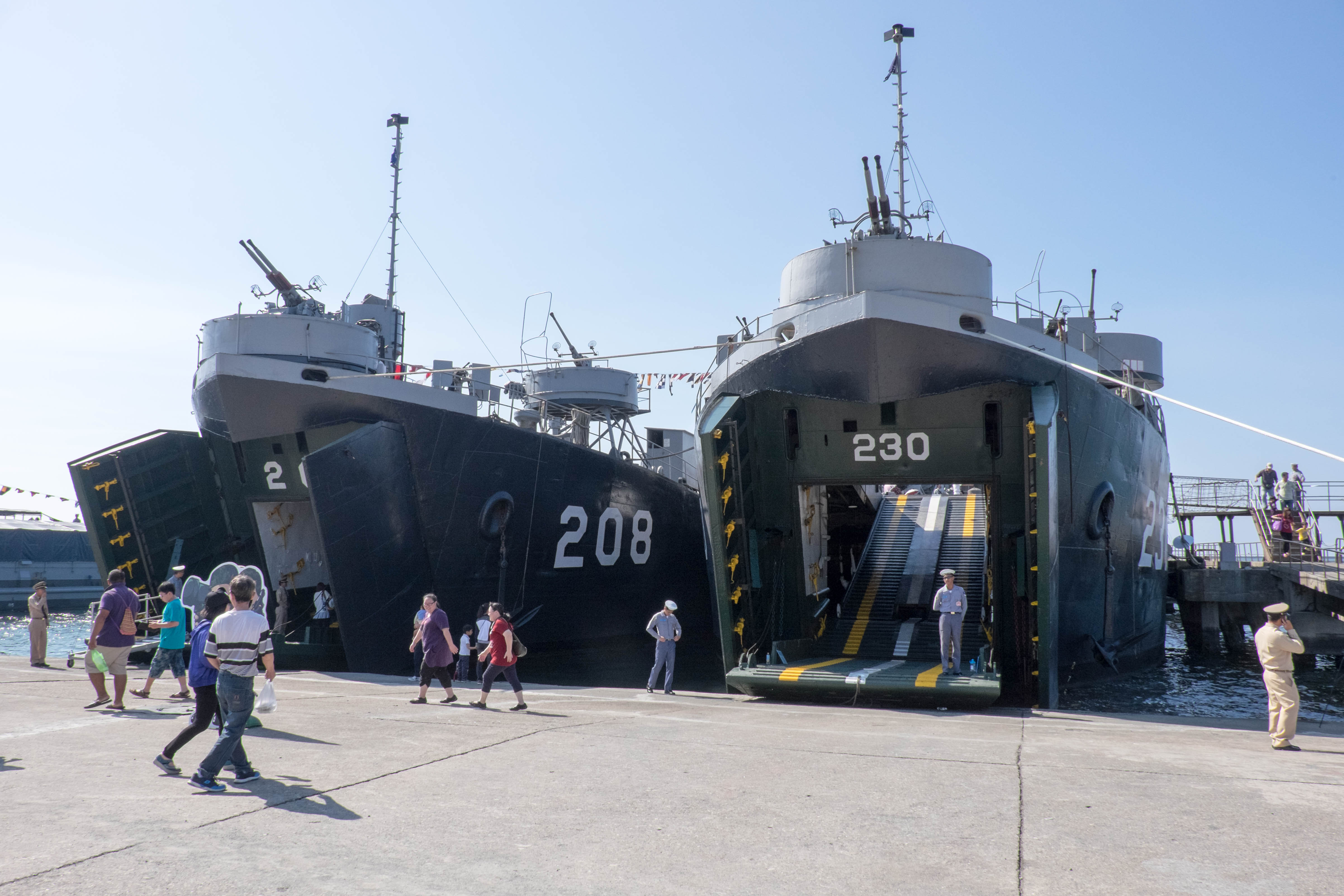
Bow view of ROCS Chung Pang and ROCS Chung Shun

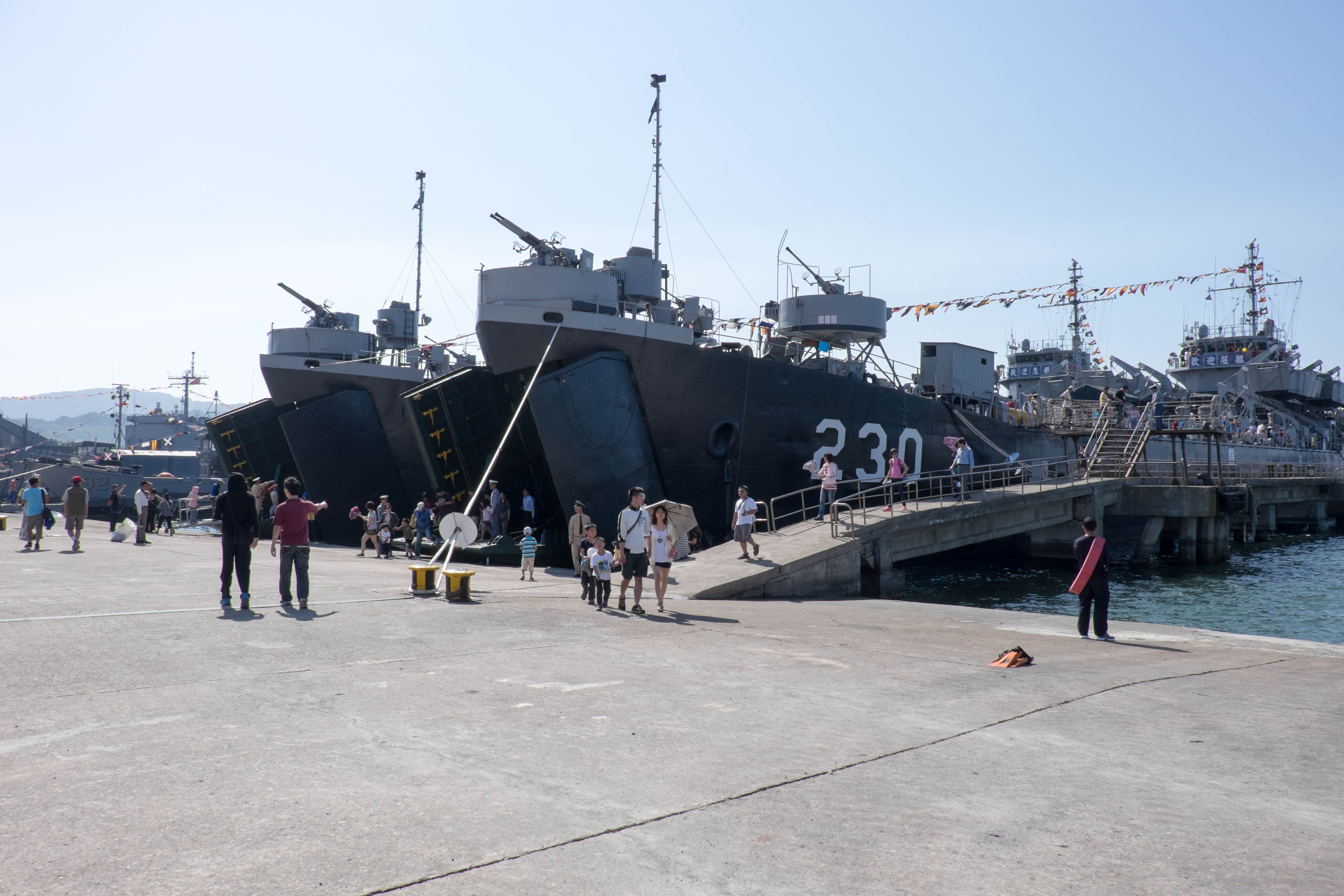
ROCS Chung Pang alongside ROCS Chung Shun

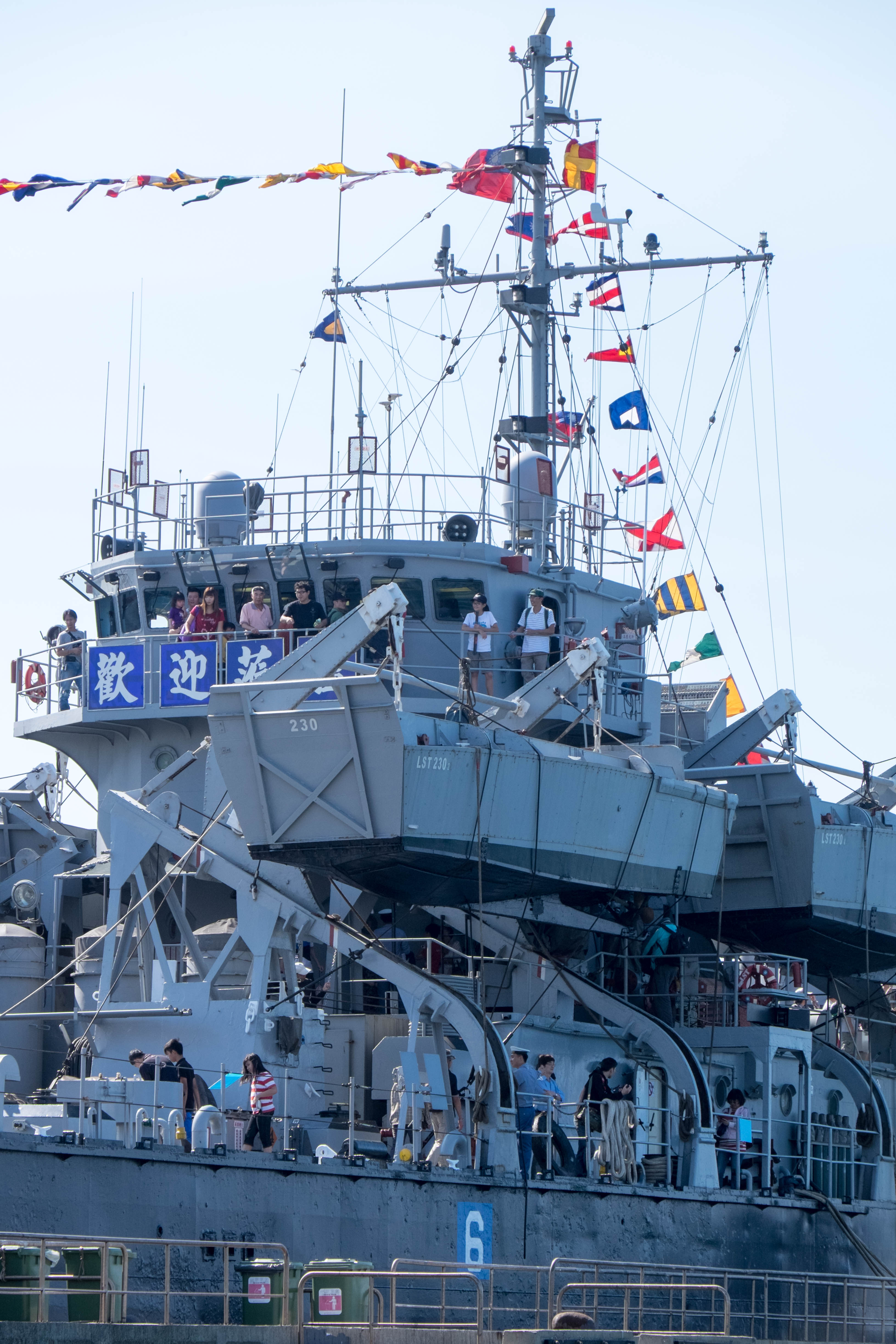
ROCS Chung Pang's LCVPs and bridge

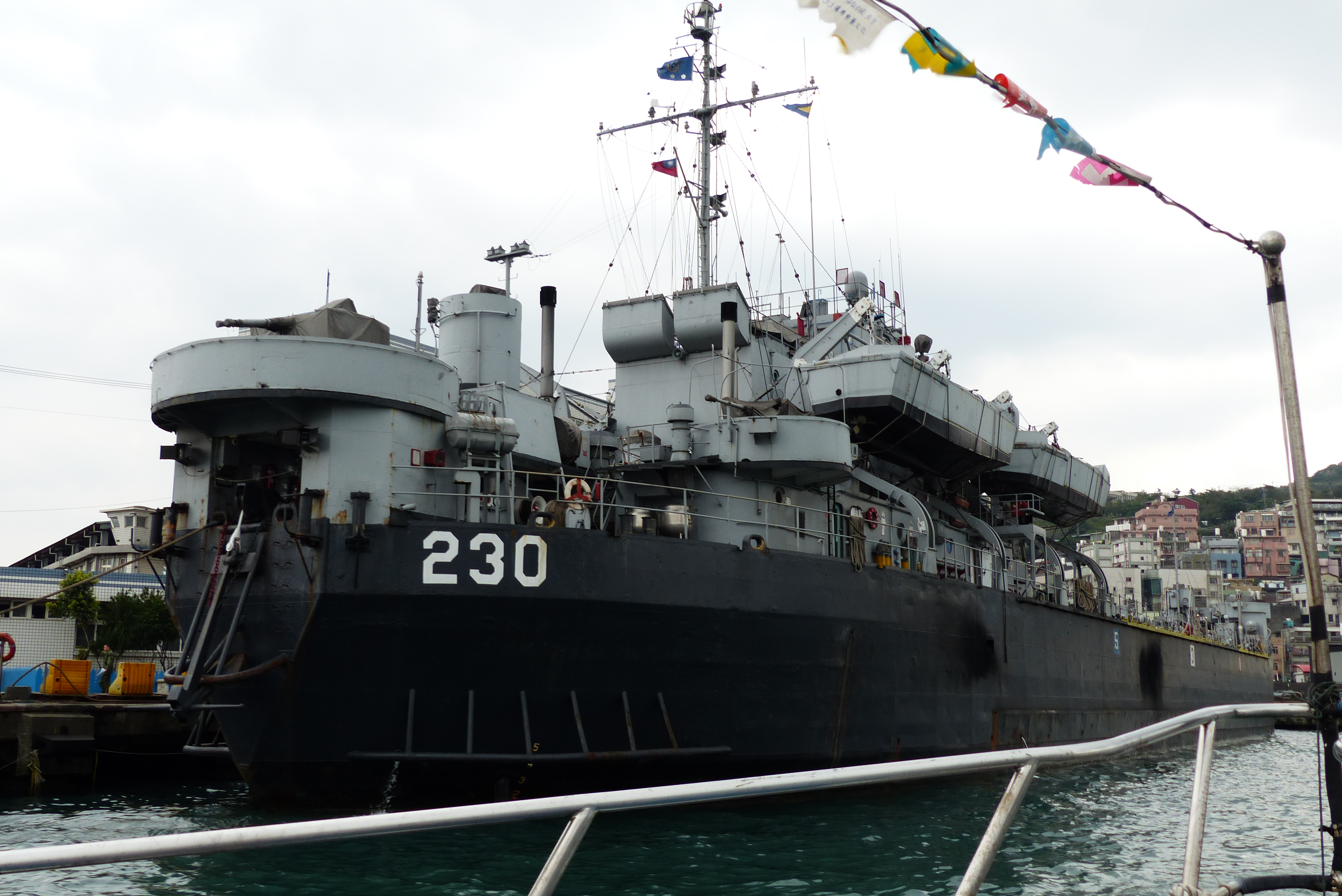
ROCS Chung Pang's aft

== Sources ==
- United States. Dept. of the Treasury (1962). Treasury Decisions Under the Customs, Internal Revenue, Industrial Alcohol, Narcotic and Other Laws, Volume 97. U.S. Government Printing Office.
- Moore, Capt. John (1984). Jane's Fighting Ships 1984-85. Jane's Information Group. ISBN 978-0710607959.
- Saunders, Stephen (2009). Jane's Fighting Ships 2009-2010. Jane's Information Group. ISBN 978-0710628886.
- Fairplay International Shipping Journal Volume 222. United Kingdom: Fairplay Publishing Limited. 1967.
