= John Moore (Royal Navy officer) =

- Born: John Evelyn Moore; 11 November 1921; St Illario, near Genoa, Italy
- Died: 8 July 2010 (aged 88); East Sussex, United Kingdom
- Spouses: Joanna Pardoe; Barbara Kerry
- Children: 2 daughters, 1 son
- Military career
- Allegiance: Kingdom of Great Britain
- Branch: Royal Navy
- Service years: 1939–1972
- Rank: Captain
- Commands: HMS Totem; HMS Alaric; Seventh Submarine Division

Captain John Evelyn Moore (11 November 1921 – 8 July 2010) was a submariner in the Royal Navy, a Fellow of the Royal Geographical Society and after retirement from the Royal Navy the author for 15 years of the authoritative naval publication Jane's Fighting Ships.

== Early life and naval career ==
Born at St Illario just outside Genoa on 11 November 1921 Armistice Day, Moore was the son of an import-export merchant. The family then moved to New Zealand before Moore was sent to Sherborne, an independent boys' boarding school in Dorset, to complete his education. He joined the Royal Navy in 1939 and after specialising in hydrographic surveying was appointed a Fellow of the Royal Geographical Society in 1942. He joined the submarine service in 1944, later commanding the submarines HMS Tactician, HMS Telemachus, HMS Totem (P352) and HMS Alaric (P441). He served in Ankara, Turkey from 1958 to 1960 in conjunction with the Turkish Navy and NATO. From 1960 to 1963 he worked in the Plans Division of the Admiralty at Whitehall, London. From 1963 to 1965 he was Commander SM at HMS Dolphin, Gosport. He was then appointed Commander of the Seventh Submarine Squadron, based at HMS Medway (former Landing Craft Tank LCT1109) in Singapore until 1967. Following service in the Far East, Moore was promoted to captain and served as chief of staff to the Commander-in-Chief, Portsmouth, Naval Home Command (CINCNAVHOME) and later in the Defence Intelligence Staff (Navy) at the Ministry of Defence in charge of Soviet Naval Intelligence.

=== Development of 'Goldfish' and the Trongle ===
During the World War II, Moore became acquainted with the difficulties experienced in getting men from submarines to land and later in his career he devoted much attention to this subject. While in command of the Seventh Submarine Division in Singapore in the mid-60s during the period of confrontation between Malaysia and Indonesia he carried out experiments with the Special Boat Service (SBS) of the Royal Marines Commandos, working closely with a young 2nd lieutenant in that unit called Paddy Ashdown, later to become a British MP and latterly Lord Ashdown. These experiments built on earlier developments that had led to the development of 'Goldfish', which allowed submariners to enter and leave their vessels while submerged. Moore designed a device which he named 'Trongle' that allowed submariners to locate their vessel in the hours of darkness, revolutionising the way the SBS operated.

== Editor of Jane's Fighting Ships ==
On retirement from the Royal Navy in 1973 Moore became editor of the authoritative Jane's Fighting Ships, which he did for the fifteen years until 1988, expanding the number of countries whose navies were described in detail from 108 to 152. During this period the first personal computers became available, but Moore did not use one, preferring a manual filing system in a shed in the garden at his home in Rickney, Sussex and communicating with contacts worldwide by letters written in longhand,

=== Other publications ===
Besides editing 15 editions of Jane's Fighting Ships and other works published by Jane's, Moore published several books including: The Soviet Navy Today (1976); Warships of the Royal Navy (1979); Seapower and Politics from the Norman Conquest to the Present Day (1979); Warships of the Soviet Navy (1981); The Encyclopedia of the World's Warships(1985); (with Richard Compton-Hall) Submarine Warfare: Today and Tomorrow (1986); and The Impact of Polaris (1999).

== Honorary appointments ==
Moore was appointed visiting professor of International Relations at the University of Aberdeen from 1987 to 1989 and at the University of St Andrews from 1990 to 1992.

== Sources ==
- "Captain John Moore". The Daily Telegraph. London. 23 August 2010.
- "Captain John Moore, naval officer and editor". The Scotsman. Edinburgh. 27 August 2010.
- "Captain John Moore – Janes Fighting Ships". RNZN Communicators Association. 25 August 2010.
