= USS LST-503 =

LST-491-class landing ship tank

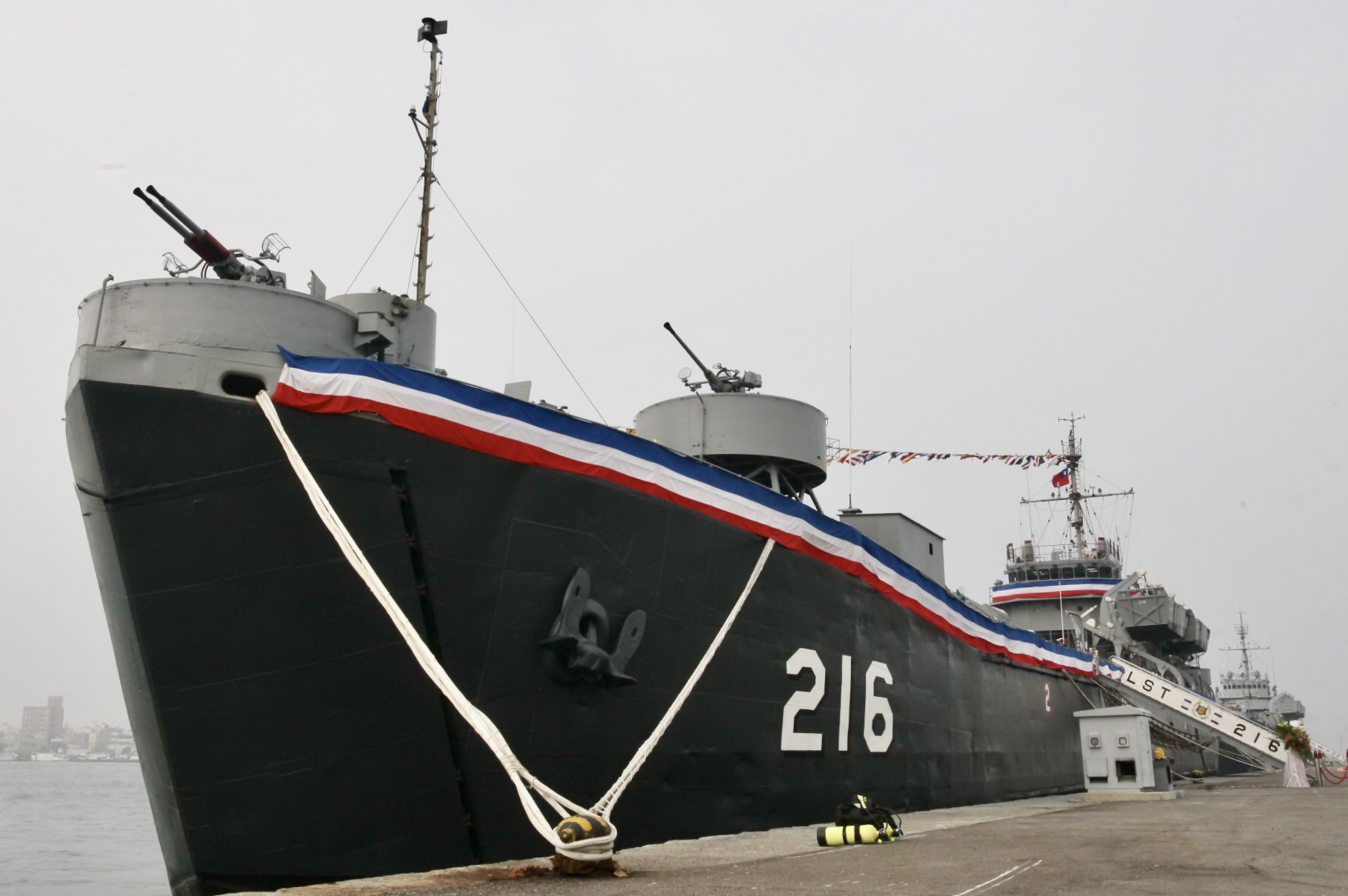
- ROCS Chung Kuang on 16 February 2009

History

United States
- Name: LST-503
- Builder: Missouri Valley Bridge and Iron Co., Evansville
- Laid down: 29 July 1943
- Launched: 8 October 1943
- Sponsored by: Mrs. David E. Eppley
- Commissioned: 8 December 1943
- Decommissioned: 11 June 1946
- Recommissioned: 9 January 1951
- Decommissioned: 4 April 1955
- Stricken: 25 April 1960
- Identification: Callsign: NDXH
- Honors and awards: See Awards
- Fate: Transferred to Republic of China, 4 April 1955

Taiwan
- Name: Chung Kuang; (中光)
- Acquired: 4 April 1955
- Commissioned: 29 April 1955
- Decommissioned: 16 February 2009
- Reclassified: LST-686, 1976; LST-216, 1976
- Identification: Hull number: LST-216
- Fate: Expended as a target 2019

General characteristics
- Class & type: LST-491-class tank landing ship
- Displacement: 1,625 long tons (1,651 t) (light); 4,080 long tons (4,145 t) (full (seagoing draft with 1,675 short tons (1,520 t) load); 2,366 long tons (2,404 t) (beaching)
- Length: 328 ft (100 m) oa
- Beam: 50 ft (15 m)
- Draft: Unloaded: 2 ft 4 in (0.71 m) forward; 7 ft 6 in (2.29 m) aft; Full load: 8 ft 3 in (2.51 m) forward; 14 ft 1 in (4.29 m) aft; Landing with 500 short tons (450 t) load: 3 ft 11 in (1.19 m) forward; 9 ft 10 in (3.00 m) aft
- Installed power: 2 × 900 hp (670 kW) Electro-Motive Diesel 12-567A diesel engines; 1,700 shp (1,300 kW)
- Propulsion: 1 × Falk main reduction gears; 2 × Propellers
- Speed: 12 kn (22 km/h; 14 mph)
- Range: 24,000 nmi (44,000 km; 28,000 mi) at 9 kn (17 km/h; 10 mph) while displacing 3,960 long tons (4,024 t)
- Boats & landing craft carried: 6 x LCVPs
- Capacity: 1,600–1,900 short tons (3,200,000–3,800,000 lb; 1,500,000–1,700,000 kg) cargo depending on mission
- Troops: 16 officers, 147 enlisted men
- Complement: 13 officers, 104 enlisted men
- Armament: Varied, ultimate armament; 2 × twin 40 mm (1.57 in) Bofors guns; 4 × single 40 mm Bofors guns; 12 × 20 mm (0.79 in) Oerlikon cannons

USS LST-503 was a LST-491-class tank landing ship in the United States Navy during World War II. She was transferred to the Republic of China Navy as ROCS Chung Kuang (LST-216).

== Construction and career ==
LST-503 was laid down on 29 July 1943 at Missouri Valley Bridge and Iron Company, Evansville, Indiana. Launched on 8 October 1943 and commissioned on 8 December 1943.

=== Service in the United States Navy ===
During World War II, LST-503 was assigned to the European theater. She then participated in the Invasion of Normandy from 6 to 25 June 1944.

She was decommissioned on 11 June 1946 and laid up in the Atlantic Reserve Fleet, Green Cove Springs, Florida.

On 9 January 1951, she was recommissioned and was homeported at NAB Little Creek, Virginia. In August, she was assigned to Operation Blue Bird in Greenland.

On 4 April 1955, the ship was decommissioned and transferred to the Republic of China.

LST-503 was struck from the Navy Register on 25 April 1960.

=== Service in the Republic of China Navy ===
She was commissioned into the Republic of China Navy on 29 April 1955 and renamed ROCS Chung Kuang (LST-216).

The ship had participated in the transportation and replenishment missions of Kinmen Island many times during the 1958, 823 artillery battle.

In 1976, she was reclassified as LST-646 but was later reverted in the same year. So far, her main tasks are transportation of personnel and vehicles, and transportation to other islands.

Chung Kuang was decommissioned on 16 February 2009.

On 11 April 2016, the Ministry of National Defense agreed to display Chung Kuang's anchor at the Taoyuan National Home of Honor (桃園榮譽國民之家), Bade District.

On 29 July 2019, her together with her sister ship Chung Pang served as a target ship for multiple F-16s fired Harpoon missiles and was hit.

== Awards ==
LST-503 have earned the following awards:

- American Campaign Medal
- European-Africa-Middle East Campaign Medal (1 battle star)
- World War II Victory Medal

== Sources ==
- United States. Dept. of the Treasury (1962). Treasury Decisions Under the Customs, Internal Revenue, Industrial Alcohol, Narcotic and Other Laws, Volume 97. U.S. Government Printing Office.
- Moore, Capt. John (1984). Jane's Fighting Ships 1984-85. Jane's Information Group. ISBN 978-0710607959.
- Saunders, Stephen (2009). Jane's Fighting Ships 2009-2010. Jane's Information Group. ISBN 978-0710628886.
- Fairplay International Shipping Journal Volume 222. United Kingdom: Fairplay Publishing Limited. 1967.
