= Combat Fleets of the World =

Naval reference book

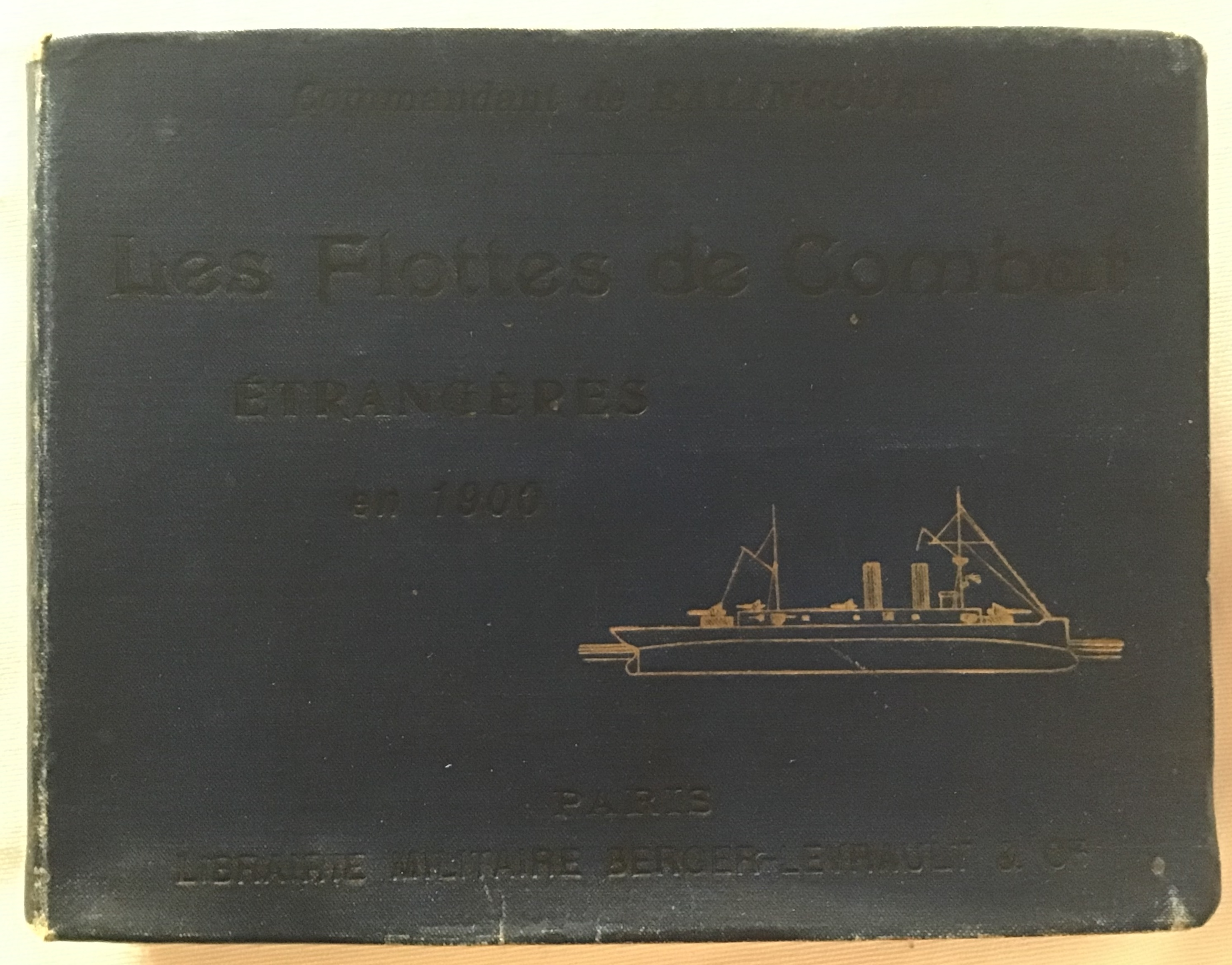
Les Flottes de Combat 1900

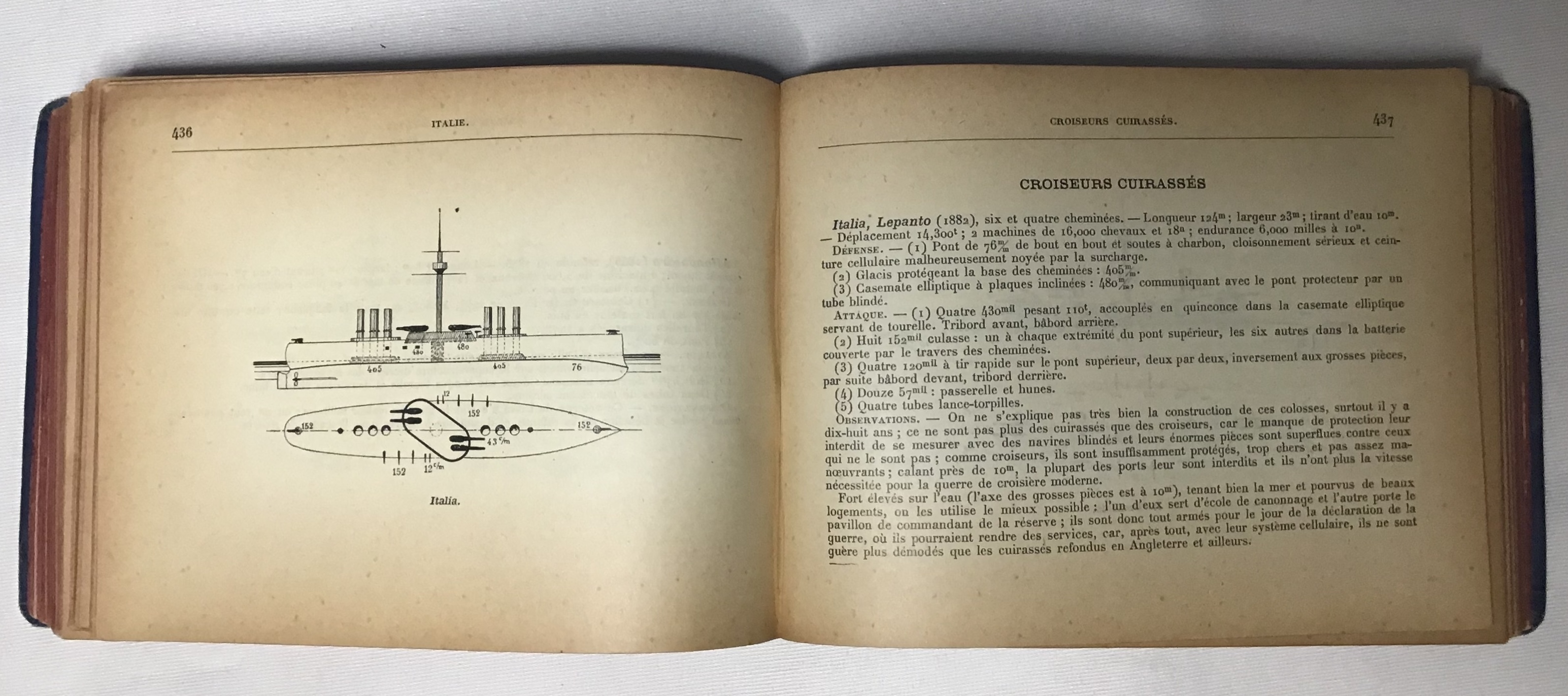
Les Flottes de Combat 1900, pages 436-437

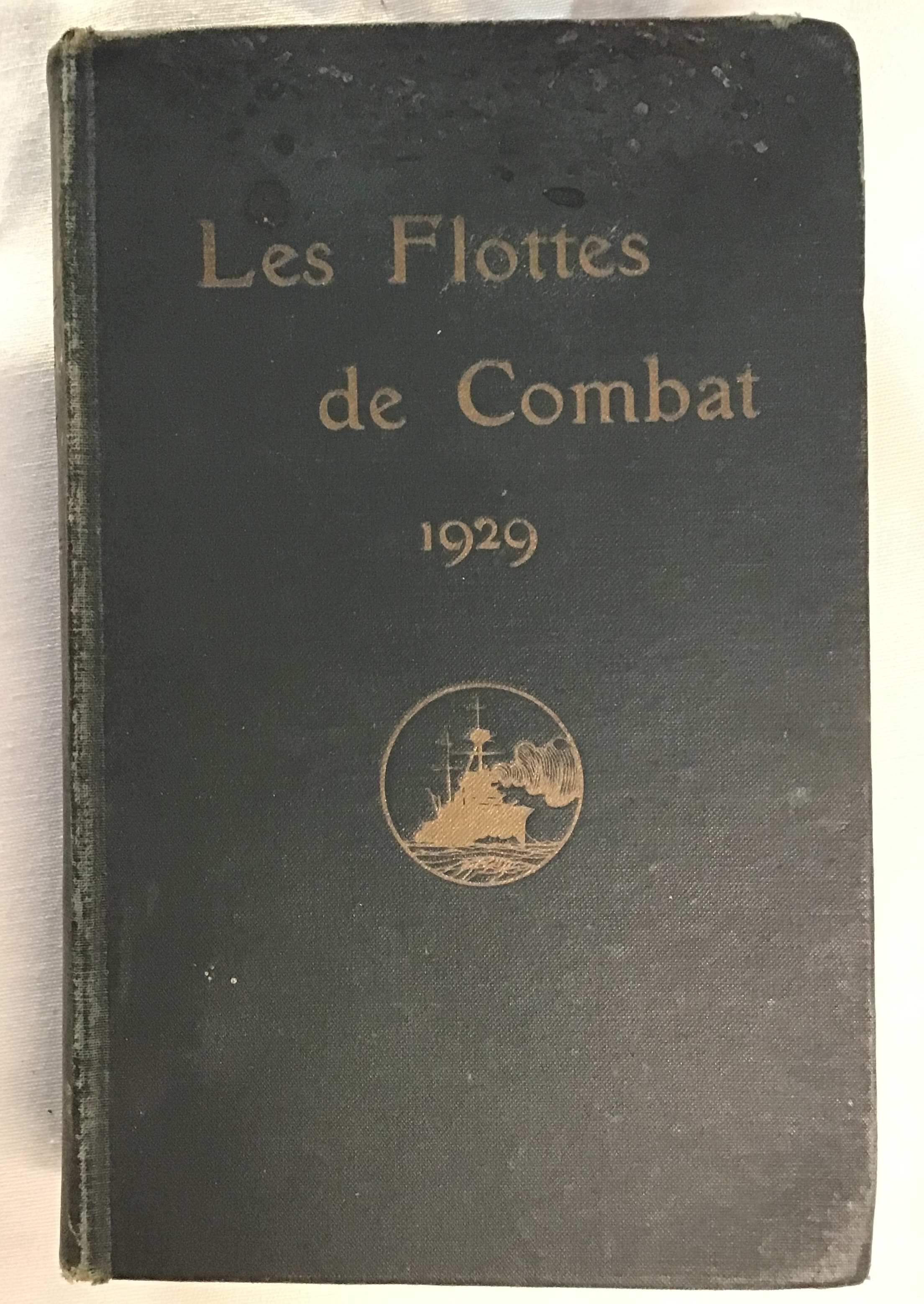
Les Flottes de Combat 1929

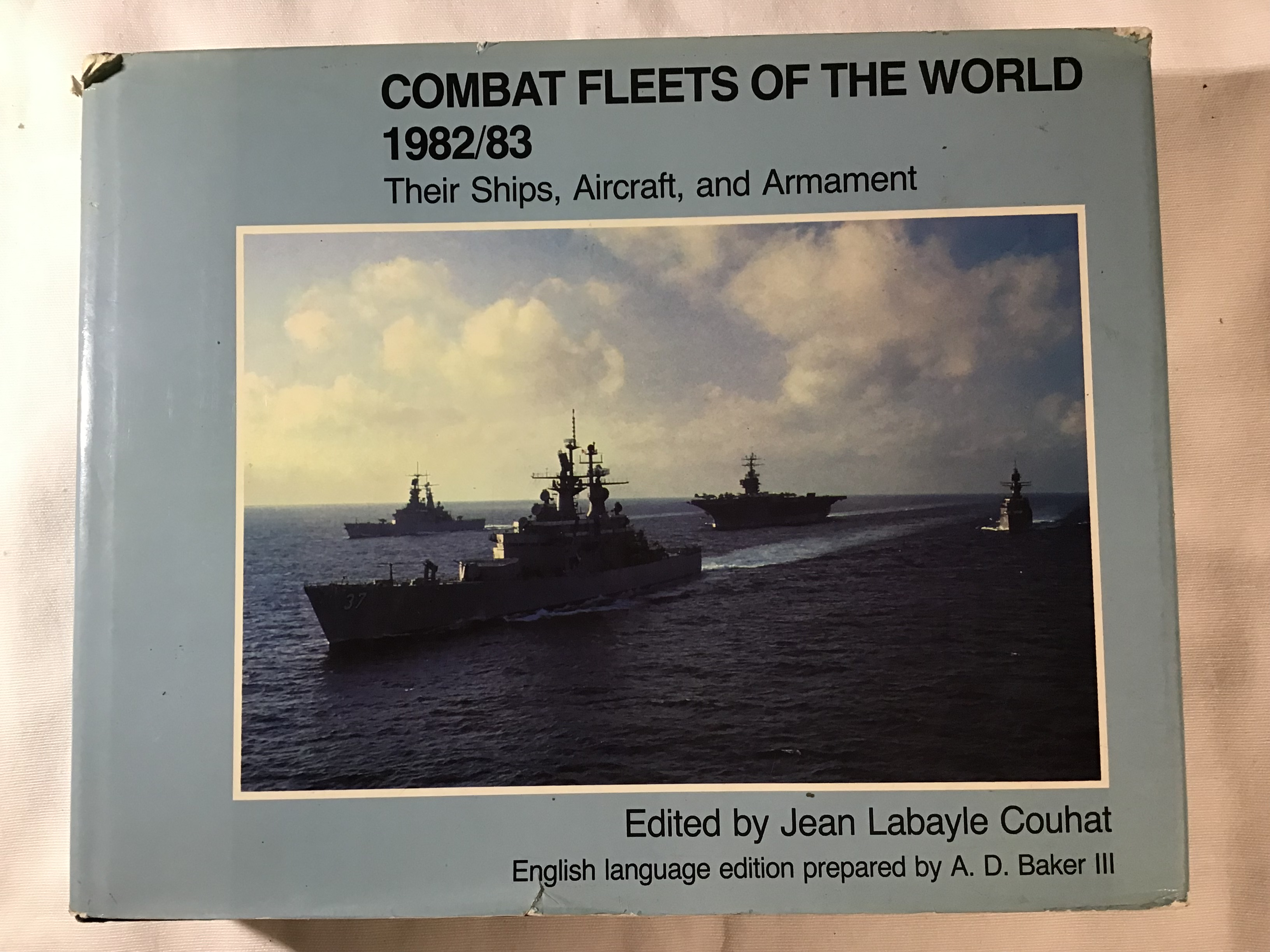
English language edition from 1982. ISBN 0-87021-125-0

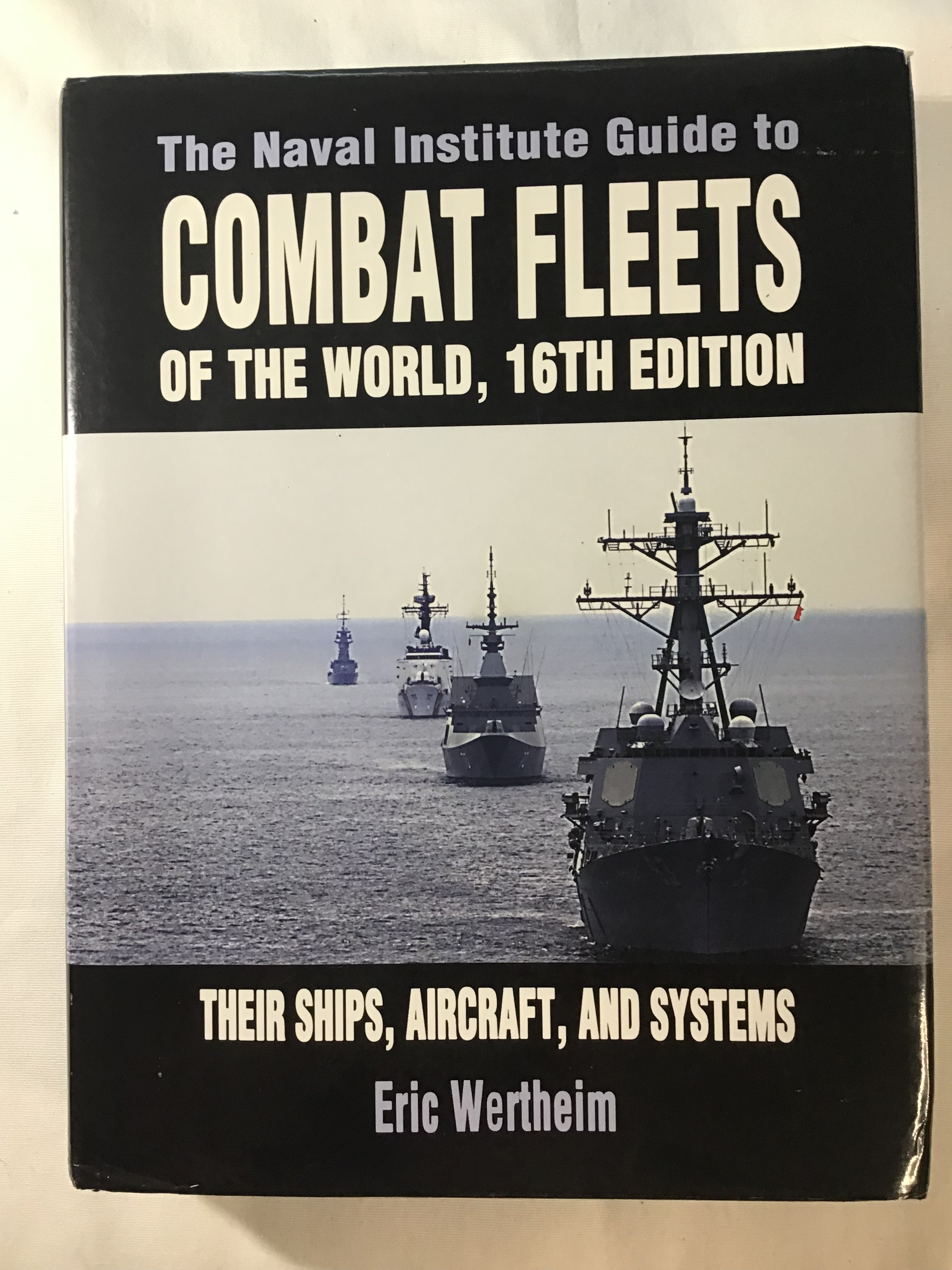
The 16th Edition ISBN 978-1-59114-954-5

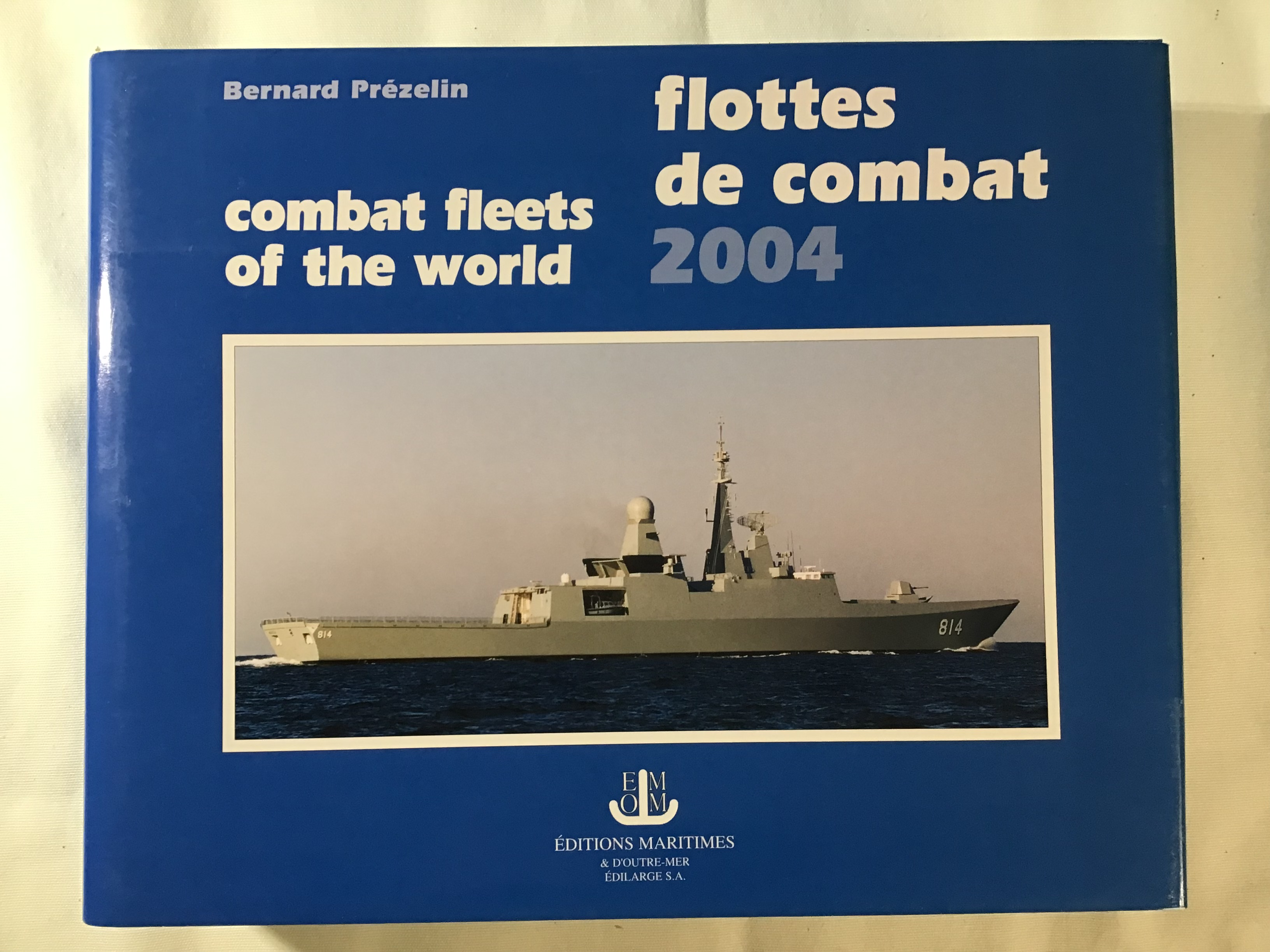
Flottes de Combat 2004. ISBN 2-7373-3379-2

Flottes de combat, translated as Combat Fleets of the World, is an almanac and reference book for the world's navies. Arranged by nation, listings include ship names, construction information, engineering characteristics, and armament specifications. Most listings include one or more photographs along with relevant observations. Sometimes, there is an elevation drawing to indicate particular characteristics. It is published in French and English.

The information provided comes from open-source intelligence, as well as correspondence with a variety of knowledgeable sources. Sister publications, Weyer's Flottentaschenbuch and Jane's Fighting Ships, are also consulted.

The original French edition was started by Commandant de Balincourt in 1897. The current publisher is Éditions Maritimes & d’Outre-Mer of Rennes, a subsidiary of Ouest-France. The English version, known as Combat Fleets of the World, has been published by Naval Institute Press in Annapolis (United States) since 1977. The latest English edition, the 16th, was published in 2013 . The latest French edition was published in 2018. The future of this publication is in some doubt.

The English language version appears months after the French language version. As a result, updates are included that make the editions differ in detail. Other differences include the French version reporting propulsion characteristics including both horsepower and kilowattage, while the English version lists only horsepower. In the French edition, the listings begin with France, then other countries follow alphabetically. The English version is alphabetical, without regard to France bring first. Each language can have different names for countries, such as: Pays-Bas/Netherlands. So, the alphabetical order is different for each version. As such, layouts vary, and the versions do not match on a page by page basis.

The first editions were in the landscape format and quite small (16x12 cm). Line drawings with side and overhead elevations were provided for visual identification. There were no photographs. By 1915, and perhaps earlier, editions were a bit larger (18x13 cm). The 1927 edition carried some photographs. Major changes came with the 1929 edition. It was larger (14x22 cm), and the portrait format was introduced. Photographs and line drawings accompanied most of the listings. The format would revert to landscape, and have another dimension adjustment (21.5 x 21 cm), with the 1947 edition. The "Les" in the title was minimized beginning in 1960, and dropped altogether by 1972. The page count would be the next major change. It went from 449 in 1972, to 698 in 1980. This allowed for expanded coverage of individual ship classes, as well as additional, larger photographs and line drawings. In 1998, a section was devoted to color photographs. By 2004 color photographs were common throughout the book. Also, the page count was up to 1200, allowing for a more thorough examination of the fleets.

== Editors ==
=== French issue ===
Start date	End	Name
1897	1928	Commandant de Balincourt
1928	1943	Commandant Vincent-Bréchignac
1943	1974	Henri Le Masson
1974	1988	Jean Labayle-Couhat
1988	2016	Commandant Bernard Prézelin
2018		Stéphane Gallois and Alexandre Sheldon-Duplaix

=== English issue ===
Start date	End	Name
1977	2002	A. D. Baker III
2002		Eric Wertheim

== Similar books ==
- Jane's Fighting Ships (United Kingdom)
- Brassey's Naval Annual (later Royal United Services Institute and Brassey's Defence Yearbook) : competing United Kingdom publication
- Almanacco Navale (Italy)
- Weyers Flottentaschenbuch (Germany)
- Marinkalender (Sweden)
