= USS LST-993 =

1944 LST-542-class tank landing ship

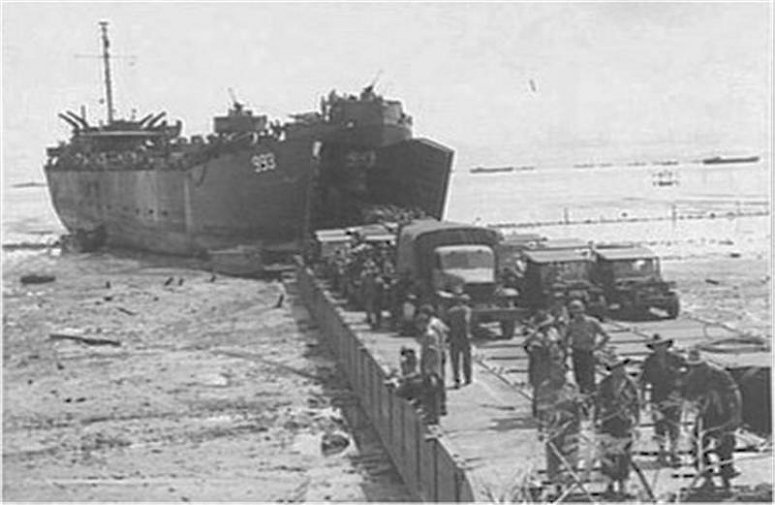
- USS LST-933 at Tarakan on 1 May 1945

History

United States
- Name: LST-993
- Builder: Boston Navy Yard
- Laid down: 7 March 1944
- Launched: 7 April 1944
- Commissioned: 12 May 1944
- Decommissioned: 1 June 1946
- Stricken: 12 March 1948
- Honours and awards: 3 battle stars (World War II)
- Fate: Transferred to the Taiwan, 7 February 1948

History

Taiwan
- Name: Chung Shun; (中訓)
- Acquired: 7 February 1948
- Commissioned: 7 February 1948
- Decommissioned: 31 December 1954
- Identification: Hull number: LST-208
- Fate: Scrapped, 31 December 1954

General characteristics
- Class & type: LST-542-class tank landing ship
- Displacement: 1,490 long tons (1,514 t) light; 4,080 long tons (4,145 t) full
- Length: 328 ft (100 m)
- Beam: 50 ft (15 m)
- Draft: 8 ft (2.4 m) forward; 14 ft 4 in (4.37 m) aft
- Propulsion: 2 × General Motors 12-567 diesel engines, two shafts
- Speed: 10.8 knots (20.0 km/h; 12.4 mph)
- Complement: 7 officers, 104 enlisted men
- Armament: 6 × 40 mm guns; 6 × 20 mm guns

USS LST-993 was an LST-542-class tank landing ship in the United States Navy. Like many of her class, she was not named and is properly referred to by her hull designation.

LST-993 was laid down on 7 March 1944 at the Boston Navy Yard; launched on 7 April 1944; sponsored by Mrs. Gladys L. Morey; and commissioned on 12 May 1944.

== Service history ==
=== Service in United States Navy ===
During World War II, LST-993 was assigned to the Asiatic-Pacific theater and participated in the following operations:

- Leyte landings — November 1944
- Lingayen Gulf landings — January 1945
- Tarakan Island operation — April and May 1945

Following the war, LST-993 performed occupation duty in the Far East and saw service in China until early June 1946. She was decommissioned on 1 June 1946. On 7 February 1948, the ship was transferred to the Republic of China. She was struck from the Navy list on 12 March 1948.

LST-993 earned three battle stars for World War II service.

=== Service in Republic of China Navy ===
On 14 August 1954, ROCS Chun Shun ran aground in the waters of the Nanji Islands in Zhejiang Province and her hull was seriously damaged. It was finally decided to abandon the ship and was scrapped on 31 December of the same year. In 1955, her name and pennant number was taken over by another LST. The second ship is ROCS Chung Shun, this makes her the second ship with the same name that has been in service so far.
