= Trongle =

Device used on submarines to help swimmers to locate a submerged submarine

Trongle is a device used on submarines to help swimmers, especially the naval special forces, to locate a submerged submarine in order that they may return to it. The trongle was invented by Captain John Moore of the Royal Navy.
