= Eric Wertheim =

Eric Wertheim (born 1973) is an American naval expert, columnist and author who writes the monthly Combat Fleets of the World column for the Naval Institute's Proceedings magazine. In 2002 he took over responsibility for compiling the Naval Institute's Combat Fleets of the World, often referred to as the "nation's premier naval reference book".

== Bibliography ==
- Wertheim, Eric (2007), The Naval Institute Guide to Combat Fleets of the World: Their Ships, Aircraft, and Systems (15th ed.), Annapolis, Maryland: Naval Institute Press, ISBN 978-1-59114-955-2
- Naval Institute Guide to Combat Fleets of the World, 2005-06 (2005)
- Chronology of the Cold War at Sea (with Norman Polmar, Andrew Bahjat and Bruce Watson) (1998)
- Dictionary of Military Abbreviations (with Norman Polmar and Mark Warren) (1994)

== See also ==
Combat Fleets of the World
