= USS LST-732 =

LST-542-class landing ship tank

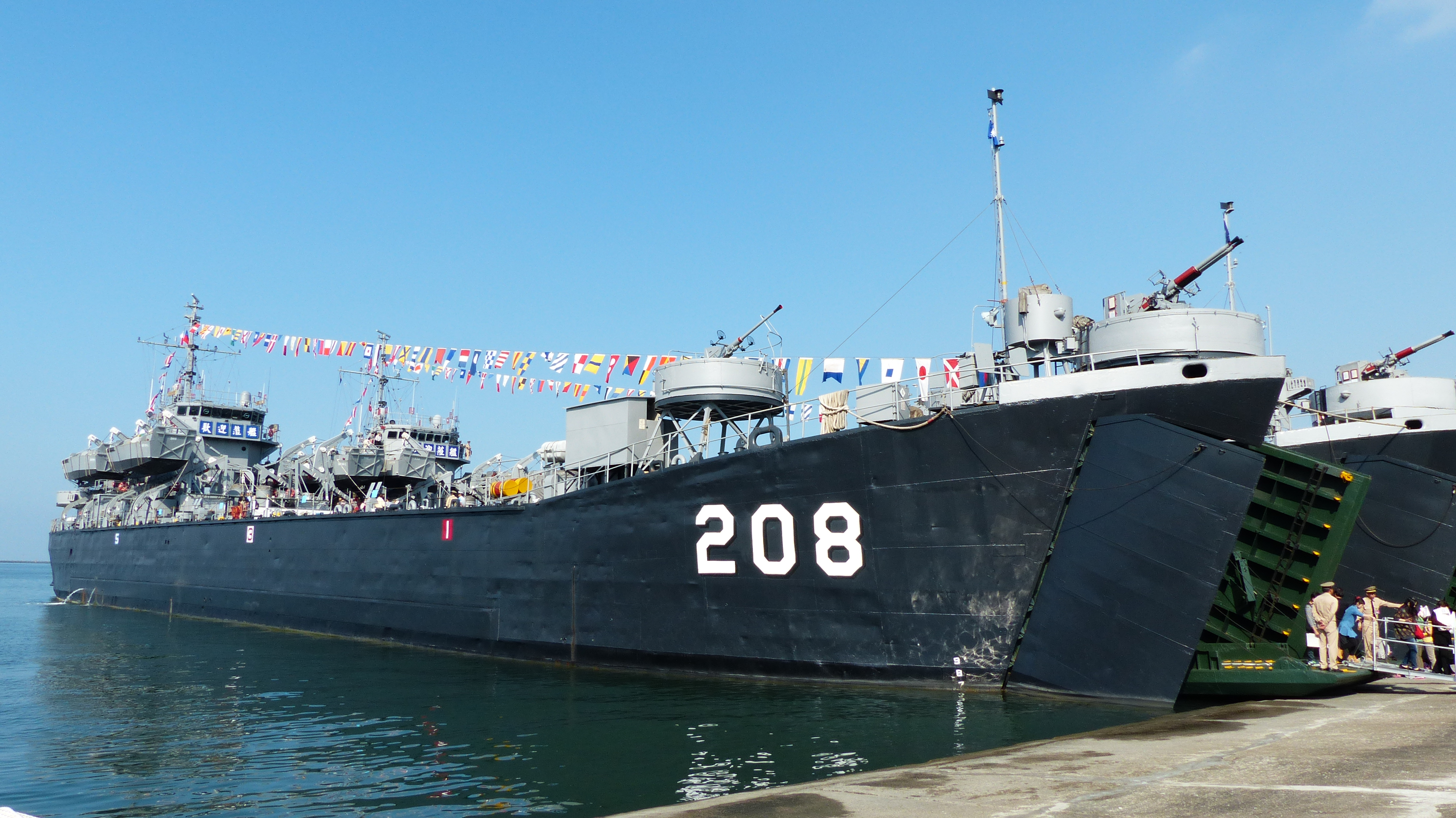
- ROCS Chung Shun on 23 November 2017

History

United States
- Name: LST-732
- Builder: Dravo Corporation, Pittsburgh
- Laid down: 5 January 1944
- Launched: 19 February 1944
- Sponsored by: Mrs. Marian B. Ross
- Commissioned: 10 April 1944
- Decommissioned: 7 June 1946
- Stricken: 19 July 1946
- Identification: Callsign: NGBT
- Honors and awards: See Awards
- Fate: Sold for commercial use, 1946

Taiwan
- Name: Chung Shun; (中訓)
- Acquired: 1955
- Commissioned: 7 January 1955
- Decommissioned: 1 April 2021
- Renamed: from Wan Guo
- Identification: Hull number: LST-208
- Status: Decommissioned

General characteristics
- Class & type: LST-542-class tank landing ship
- Displacement: 1,625 long tons (1,651 t) light; 4,080 long tons (4,145 t) full
- Length: 328 ft (100 m)
- Beam: 50 ft (15 m)
- Draft: Unloaded : 2 ft 4 in (0.71 m) forward; 7 ft 6 in (2.29 m) aft; Loaded : 8 ft 2 in (2.49 m) forward; 14 ft 1 in (4.29 m) aft
- Propulsion: 2 × General Motors 12-567 diesel engines, two shafts, twin rudders
- Speed: 12 knots (22 km/h; 14 mph)
- Boats & landing craft carried: 2 × LCVPs
- Troops: 16 officers, 147 enlisted men
- Complement: 7 officers, 104 enlisted men
- Armament: 8 × 40 mm guns; 12 × 20 mm guns

USS LST-732 was a LST-542-class tank landing ship in the United States Navy during World War II. She was transferred to the Republic of China Navy as ROCS Chung Shun (LST-208).

== Construction and commissioning ==
LST-732 was laid down on 5 January 1944 at Dravo Corporation, Pittsburgh, Pennsylvania. Launched on 19 February 1944 and commissioned on 2 February 1944.

=== Service in United States Navy ===
During World War II, LST-537 was assigned to the Asiatic-Pacific theater. She was assigned to occupation and China from 28 September to 1 November 1945 and 20 November 1945 to 7 June 1946.

She was decommissioned on 29 May 1946 and struck from the Naval Register, 12 March 1948. She was sold for commercial service named Wan Guo.

=== Service in Republic of China Navy ===
During the great retreat in 1949, she at that time was still only a civilian vessel, and had not joined the Chinese navy, but she also participated in emergency retreat operations. For example, in January of that year, the Central Radio Nanjing Main Station in the capital Nanjing was active in the chaotic situation. Operated, leased the ship, and berthed into Nanjing Xiaguan Wharf on the 22nd of the month, and then rushed to workday and night to transport more than a thousand boxes of broadcasting equipment and equipment on board. However, news of the upcoming blockade of the Yangtze River by the Lao Communist Party came one after another. So, the voyage was rushed, leaving behind a large number of equipment that was still too late to be shipped. After arriving in Shanghai in February, the important equipment of the Shanghai branch of China Central Broadcasting was installed and shipped to Taiwan.

On 14 August 1954, the Navy's then-training ship (the first-generation ROCS Chun Shun) ran aground in the waters of the Nanji Islands in Zhejiang Province and her hull was seriously damaged. It was finally decided to abandon the ship and was scrapped on 31 December of the same year. In 1955, the navy took over the Wan Guo from merchant service, using the previously scrapped Chung Shun's name and ship number LST-208. Thus, she is the second ship to be named ROCS Chung Shun that has been in service so far.

She was acquired and commissioned into the Republic of China Navy on 7 January 1955 and renamed Chung Shun (LST-208).

Chung Shun was decommissioned on 1 April 2021.

== Awards ==
LST-732 have earned the following awards:

- China Service Medal (extended)
- American Campaign Medal
- Asiatic-Pacific Campaign Medal
- World War II Victory Medal
- Navy Occupation Service Medal (with Asia clasp)

== Gallery ==
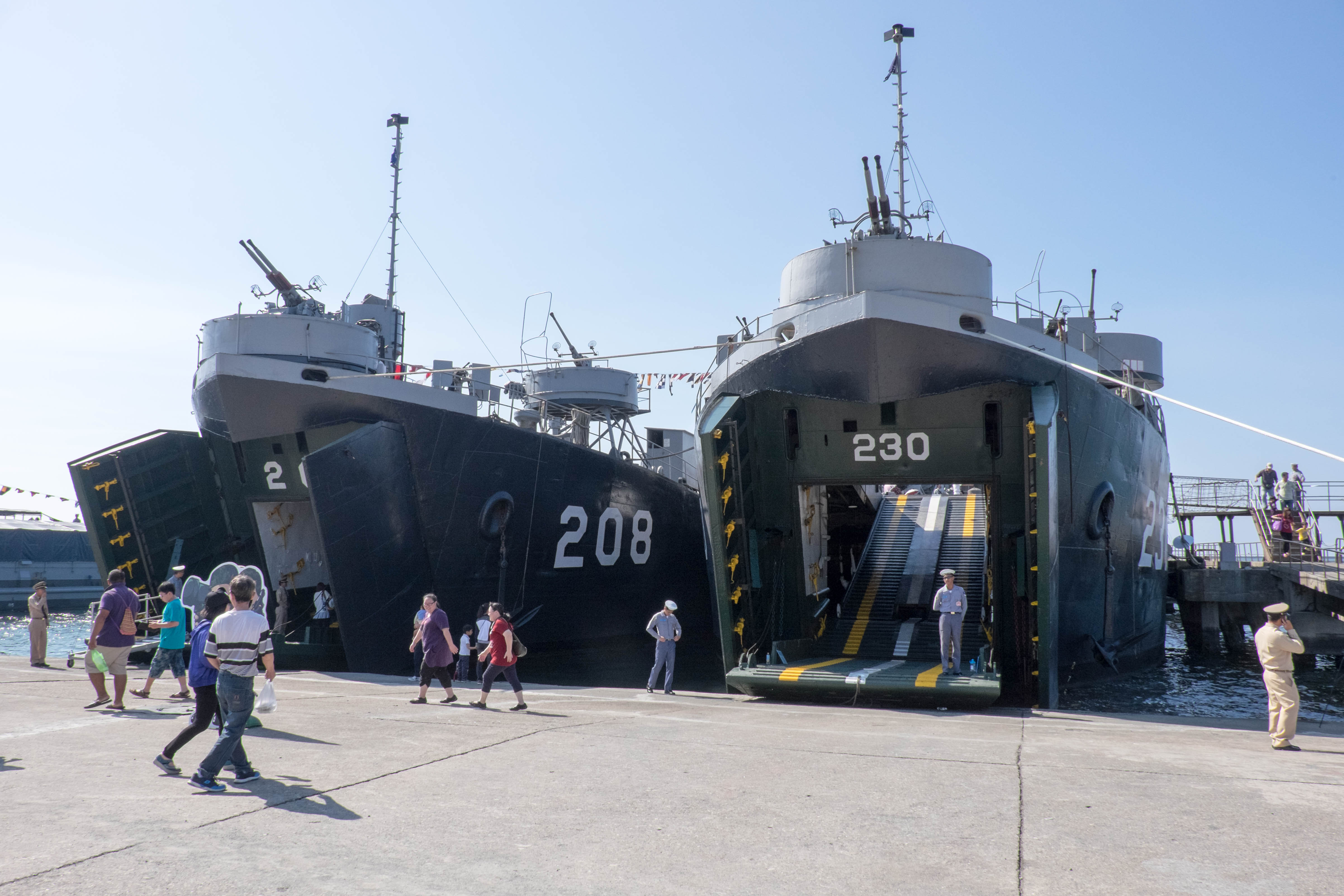
ROCS Chung Bang and ROCS Chung Shun on 23 November 2014

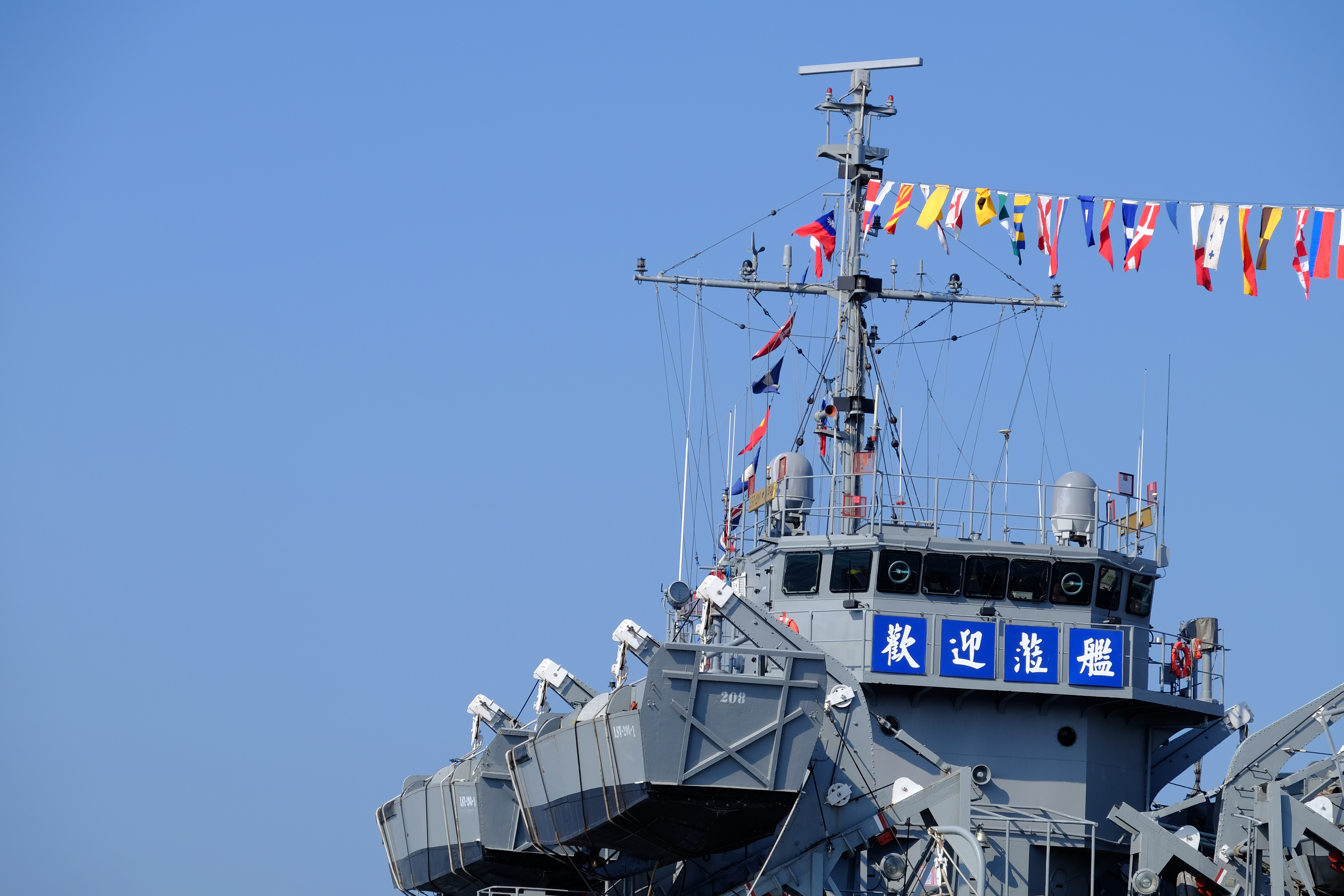
ROCS Chung Shun's main mast and bridge

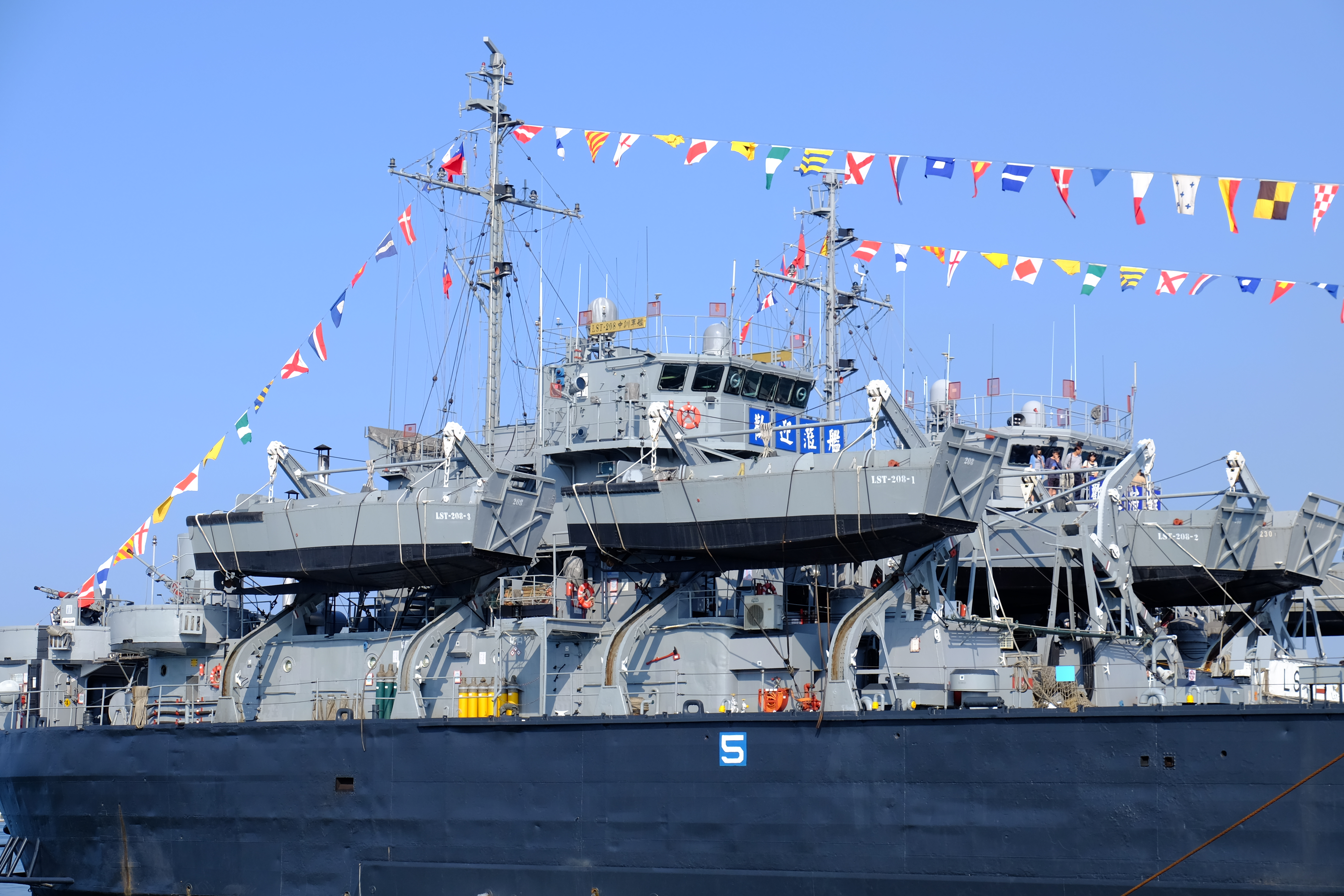
ROCS Chung Shun's LCVPs

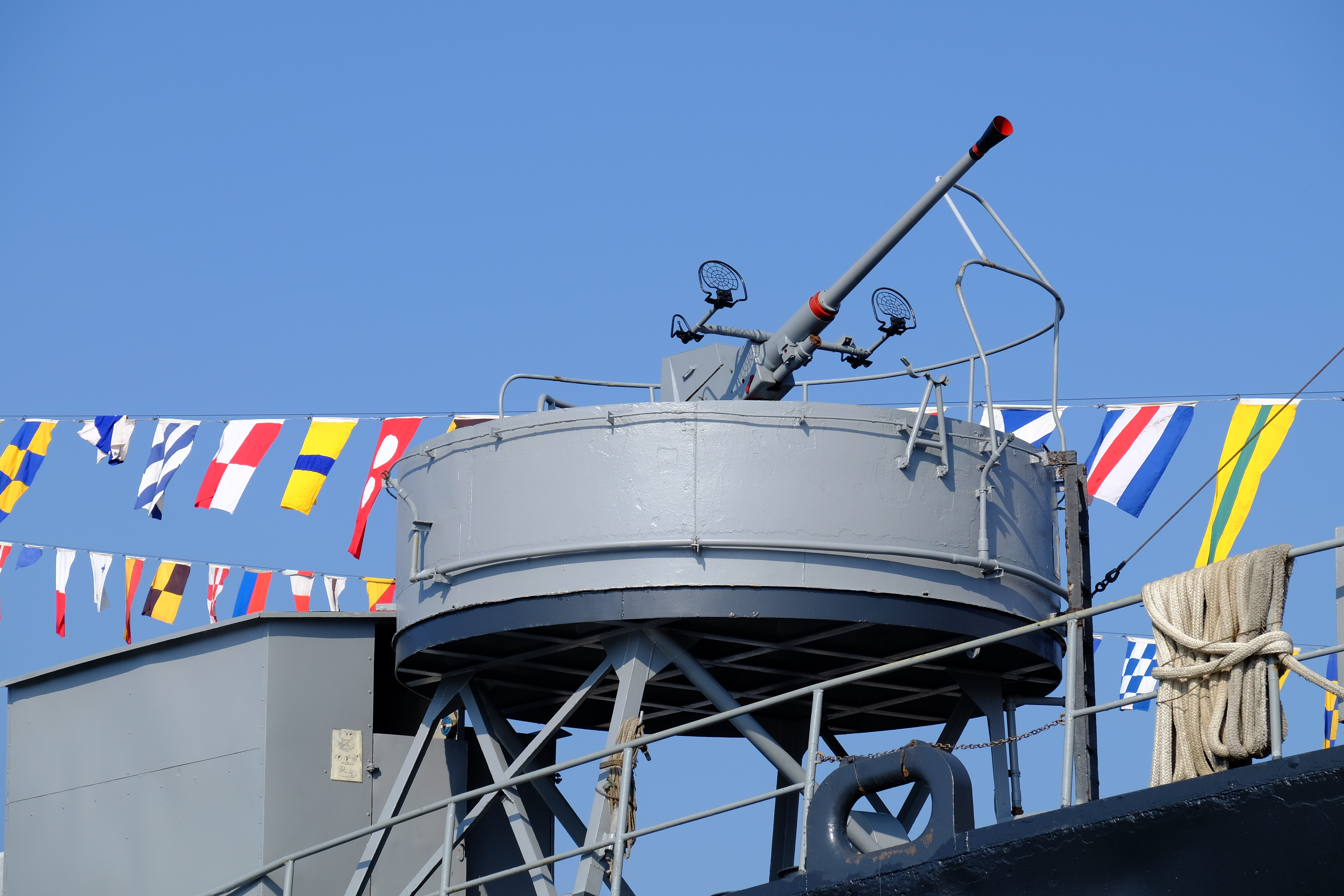
ROCS Chung Shun's single Bofors 40 mm gun

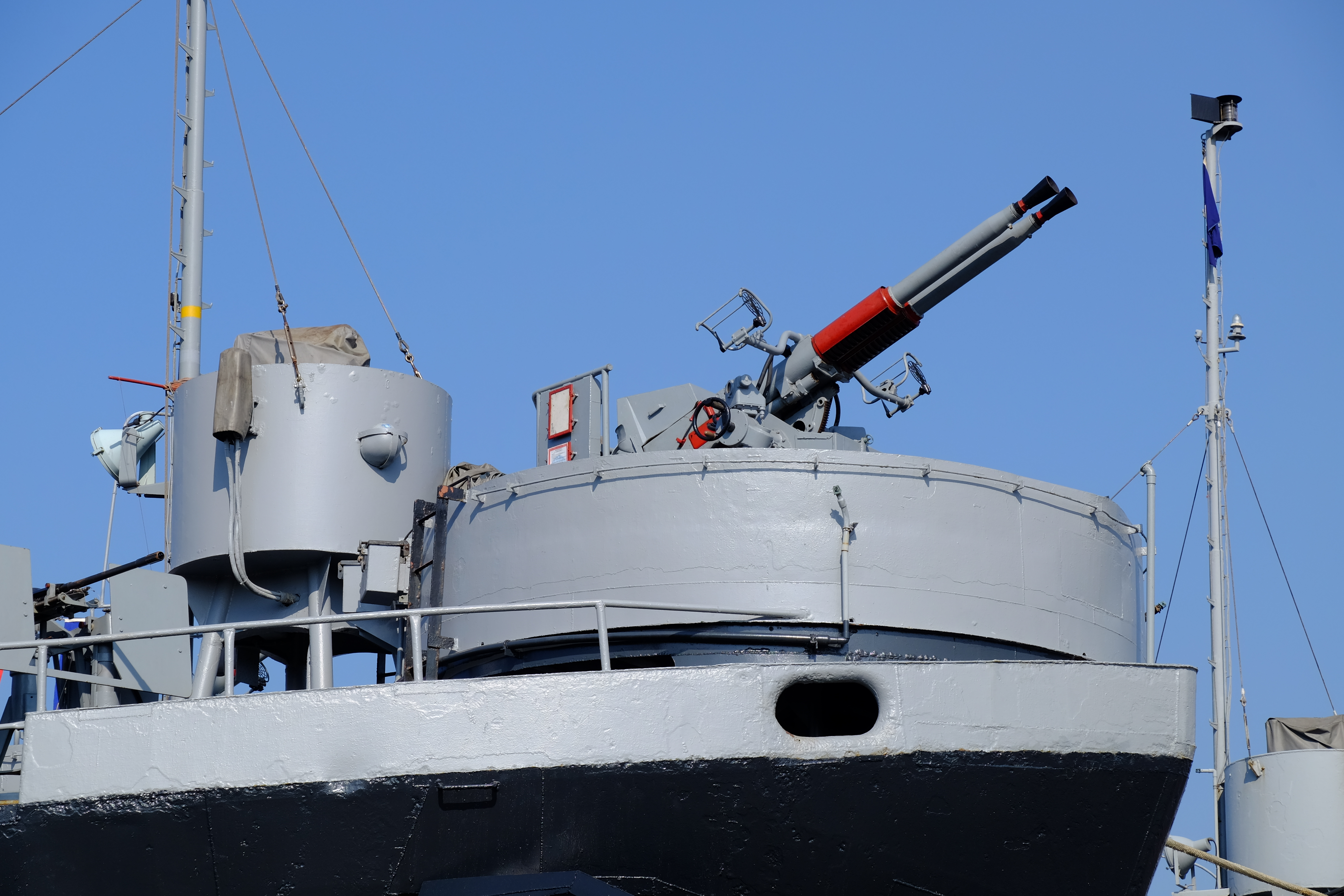
ROCS Chung Shun's twin Bofors 40 mm gun

== Sources ==
- United States. Dept. of the Treasury (1962). Treasury Decisions Under the Customs, Internal Revenue, Industrial Alcohol, Narcotic and Other Laws, Volume 97. U.S. Government Printing Office.
- Moore, Capt. John (1984). Jane's Fighting Ships 1984-85. Jane's Information Group. ISBN 978-0710607959.
- Saunders, Stephen (2009). Jane's Fighting Ships 2009-2010. Jane's Information Group. ISBN 978-0710628886.
- Fairplay International Shipping Journal Volume 222. United Kingdom: Fairplay Publishing Limited. 1967.
