= HMS Telemachus =

Two ships of the Royal Navy have borne the name HMS Telemachus, after Telemachus, a figure in Greek mythology, the son of Odysseus and Penelope, and a central character in Homer's Odyssey:

- HMS Telemachus (1917) was an R-class destroyer launched in 1917 and sold in 1927.
- HMS Telemachus (P321) was a T-class submarine launched in 1943 and scrapped in 1961.

In addition, the Royal Navy employed a hired armed cutter Telemachus between 1795 and 1801.
