= HMS Tactician =

Two ships of the British Royal Navy have been named Tactician

- HMS Tactician (1918), an S-class destroyer launched in 1918.
- HMS Tactician (P314), a T-class submarine launched in 1942
