= Janes Fighting Ships =

Annual warship reference book

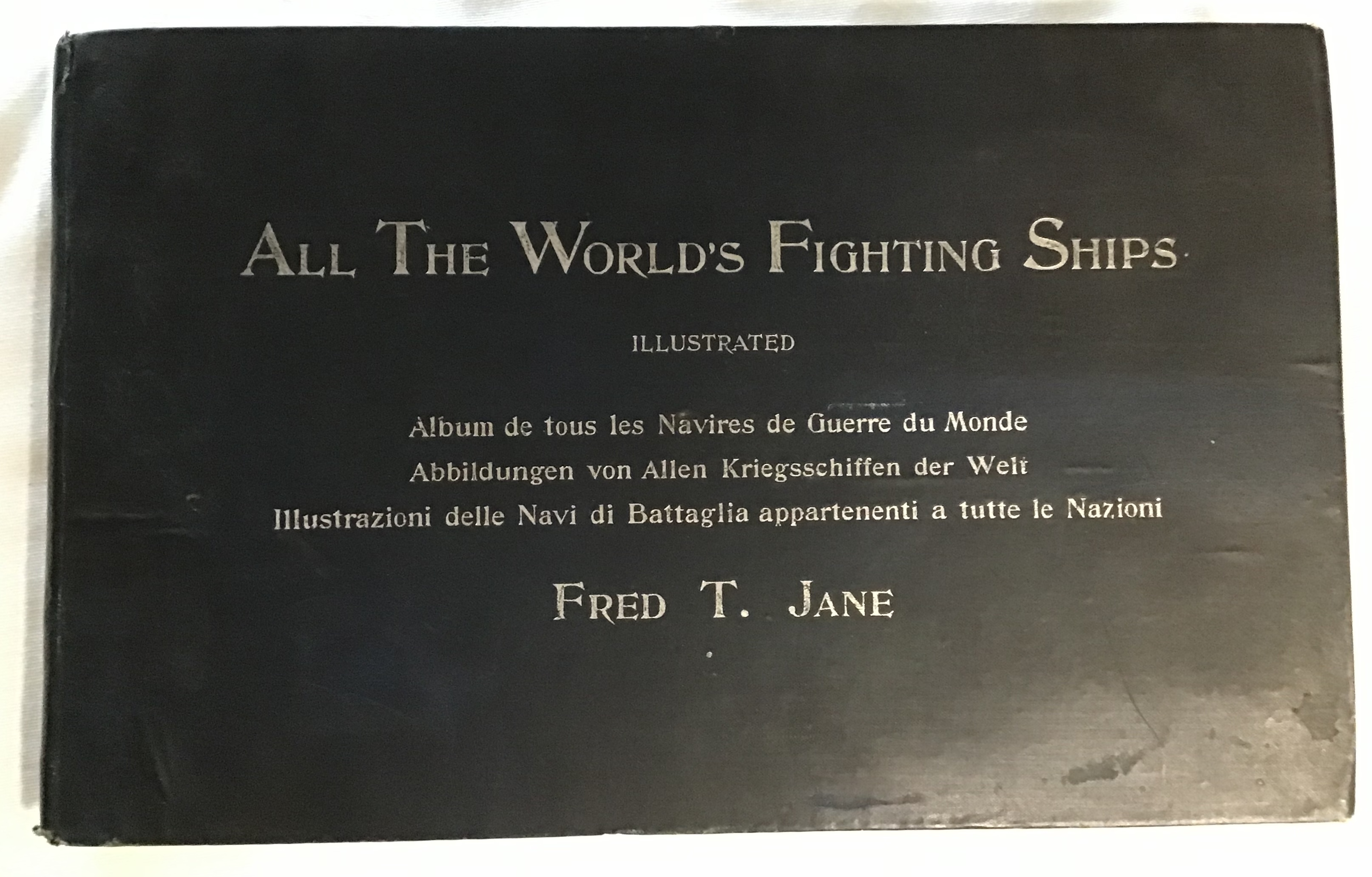
Cover of the first edition, 1898

Janes Fighting Ships (known as Jane's Fighting Ships before 2020) is an annual reference book of each country's navy and coast guard, along with their weapons and aircraft. Included are ship names, construction data, size, speed, range, complement, engineering, armament, and sensors. This is generally followed by relevant commentary. Originally, it was illustrated with ink sketches done by founder Fred T. Jane.

== History ==
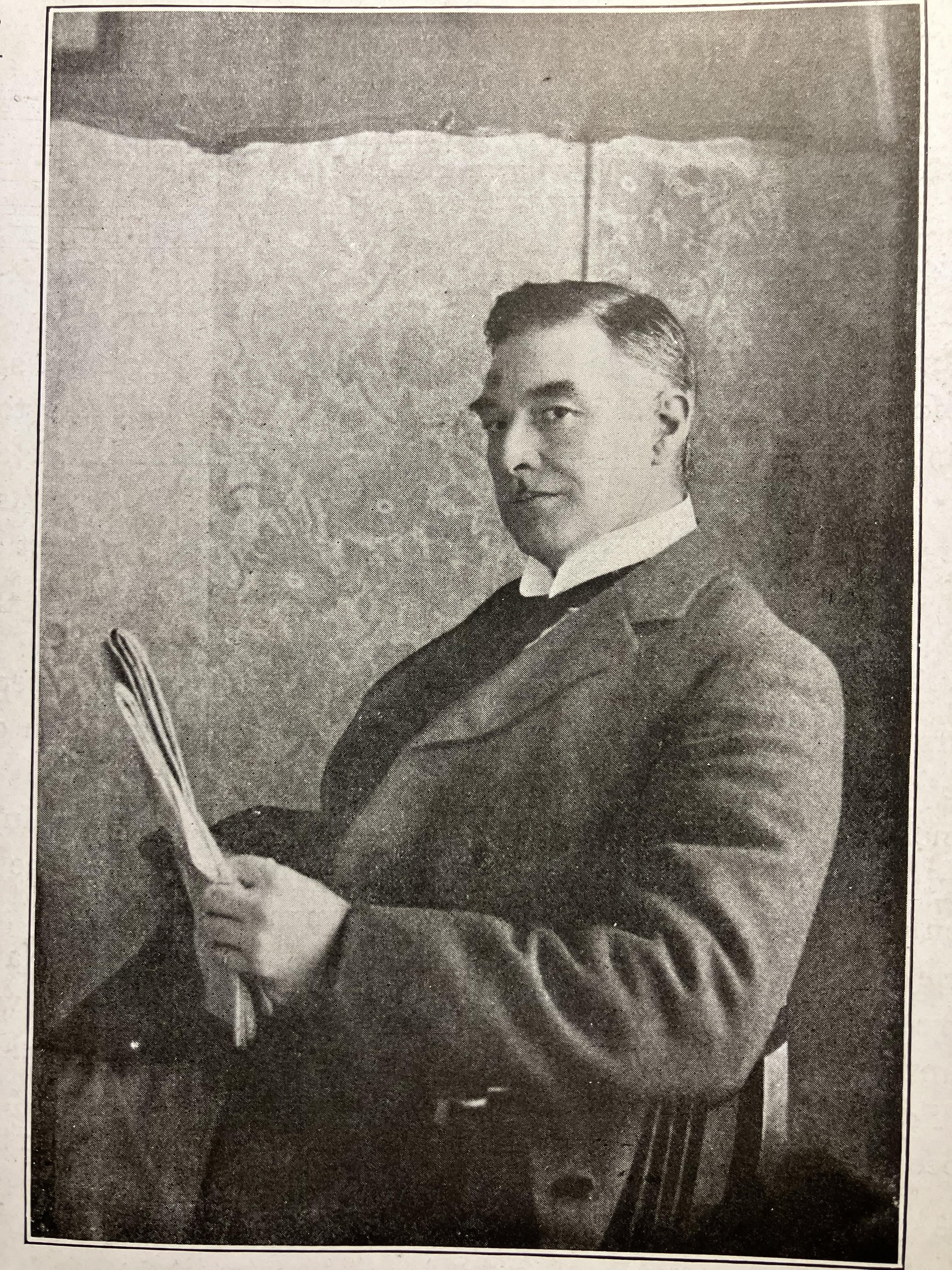
Fred T. Jane late in life

Fred T. Jane (1865–1916) was a struggling English commercial artist and journalist with an interest in naval affairs. In the 1880s, he set out to record all of the armoured warships serving in the world's navies. His plan was to publish this record with the title Ironclads of the World. Initially, Brassey's Naval Annual and various Royal Navy periodicals were the source of inspiration for his drawings. In later years, he became acquainted with a collector of warship photographs, W. A. Bieber. This enabled Jane to complete nearly 500 drawings. The first edition was published in early 1898 as All The World's Fighting Ships. It cost 10s. 6d. (£0.53) and was an immediate success. Jane's book was the first naval almanac/encyclopedia to put the illustrations alongside the technical data, which simplified the reference. It also had a silhouette section that directed the user to ships that shared certain characteristics, such as the number of funnels, aiding in rapid identification of unfamiliar ships at sea.

Jane's has been published every year since 1898, with the exception of the 1940s, when only eight of ten years saw new editions. There were a number of contributing factors to this gap. Vast wartime construction programs were difficult to verify. Extensive modifications were made to warships, again, difficult to verify under wartime conditions. Ships were also sunk or destroyed, a vexing complication. At the end of the war, demobilization and redistribution of naval assets was rapid and complex. After 1942, editions were published with paired, hyphenated years, beginning with 1943–44. This essentially skipped the 1943 edition, as it was published in 1944. The 1944–45 edition was published in 1946, meaning that no edition was actually published in 1945. There was no 1945–46 edition. The 1946–47 edition was published in 1947, with succeeding editions arriving every year since (e.g. 2024–25).

Vintage editions of Jane's Fighting Ships are considered collectable. Those published before World War Two are uncommon, while volumes published prior to World War One are scarce.

The first photo appeared in the 1899 edition. From the 1900 edition, photographs would rapidly replace the sketches. Color photographs were introduced to the Forward with the 1990–91 edition. With the 1997–98 edition, colour photographs began to appear in individual country listings and soon predominated.

By the 1903 edition, the title on the spine was printed as Jane's Fighting Ships. In 1916, the title page followed suit. It was not until 1922 or 1923 that the front cover did as well. The apostrophe in Jane's was dropped in 2020.

=== Publishers ===
The first two editions were published by Sampson Low (England), and Little Brown (United States). Sampson Low solely published the 1900 through 1940 editions. Wartime demand brought in Macmillan to publish a North American edition from 1941 to the 1947–48 edition. McGraw Hill took over from Macmillan in publishing the North American edition through the 1973–74 edition. Both Sampson Low and McGraw Hill ended their association with Jane's when Jane's Yearbooks publisher Franklin Watts took over with the 1974–75 edition. That iteration was succeeded by Jane's Publishing Company in 1980–81, and then by Jane's Information Group (JIG) with the 1990–91 edition. JIG was acquired by Information Handling Services (IHS) in 2007. IHS was merged with Markit to form IHS Markit Ltd in 2016. In turn, IHS Markit sold Jane's Information Group to private equity firm Montagu Private Equity in 2019.

=== Content ordering ===
Since the 1961–62 edition, navies have been listed in alphabetical order. That had been the policy from 1898 to 1902. However, from 1903 to 1921, the principal navies were listed in order of strength, with the lesser navies following in geographic clusters. From 1922 through the 1960–61 edition, the Royal Navy was listed first, followed by Dominion navies in alphabetical order, and then by the rest of the world. As the Dominions gained independence, they lobbied to be listed separately. As a result, the editors reverted to the 1898 order, conceding that it was more logical as well as handier for the user.

Warship types are listed in a subjective order of importance, which is generally related to size. An exception to this is the submarine, which is now highly regarded, despite tending to be smaller than many surface ships. Type designation is done by the individual navies. This is imperfect, and can be the subject of spirited discussion. Nevertheless, most types (for example: frigate) hold generally true. Ships built to the same general design (class) are listed together. Each class is listed in chronological order, from newest to oldest. The details are assembled by the editors, primarily using open-source intelligence (OSINT).

=== Related works ===
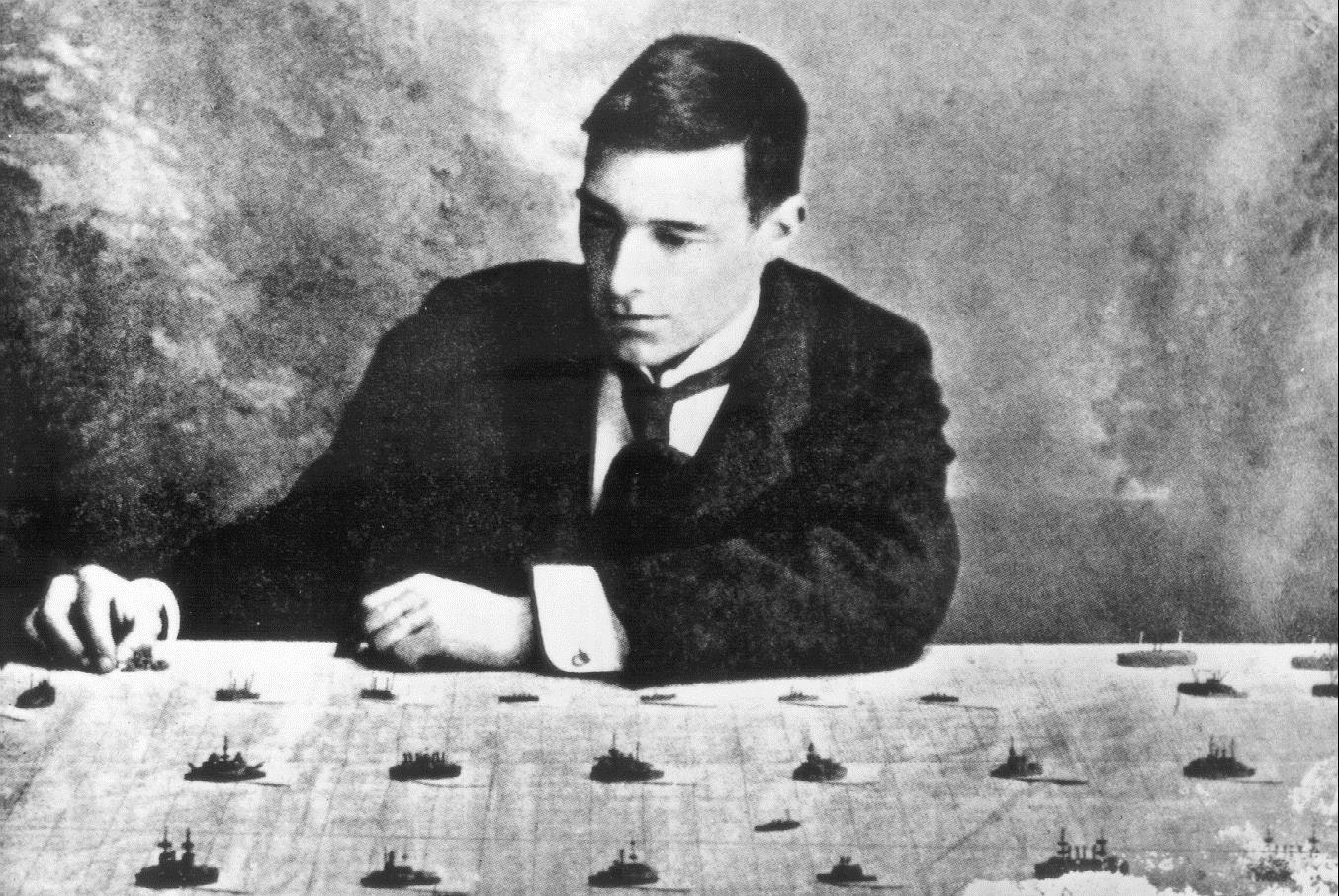
Fred T. Jane with his Naval War Game in 1898

The publication's success launched many popular, military and commercial reference titles that carry the name "Janes". As of 2024, Janes had 35 such titles in print. In the past, Sampson Low, Jane's Yearbooks, Jane's Publishing and JIG have published dozens of similar titles.

The Jane Naval War Game was produced in 1899 and advertised in that year's edition.

Ten early editions of Jane's (those of 1898, 1905–06, 1906–07, 1914, 1919, 1924, 1931, 1939, 1944–45, and 1950–51) were reissued in facsimile reprints by Arco Publishing starting in 1969. All of these appeared in the landscape format that characterized the series until the 1956–57 edition, while since 1957–58 the present portrait layout was adopted, thus matching sister publication Jane's All the World's Aircraft.

In 1996, Janes became available on CD-ROM and other forms of electronic delivery.

== Editors ==
- 1898–1915: Fred T. Jane
- 1916–1918: Maurice Prendergast
- 1919–1921: Oscar Parkes with Maurice Prendergast
- 1922: Oscar Parkes
- 1923–1929: Oscar Parkes and Francis E. McMurtrie
- 1930–1934: Oscar Parkes
- 1935–1948: Francis E. McMurtrie
- 1949–1950: Francis E. McMurtrie and Raymond Blackman
- 1951–1973: Raymond Blackman
- 1974–1988: Capt. John Moore (RN)
- 1988–2000: Capt. Richard Sharpe (RN)
- 2000–2017: Commodore Stephen Saunders (RN)
- 2018–present: Alex Pape

== Gallery ==
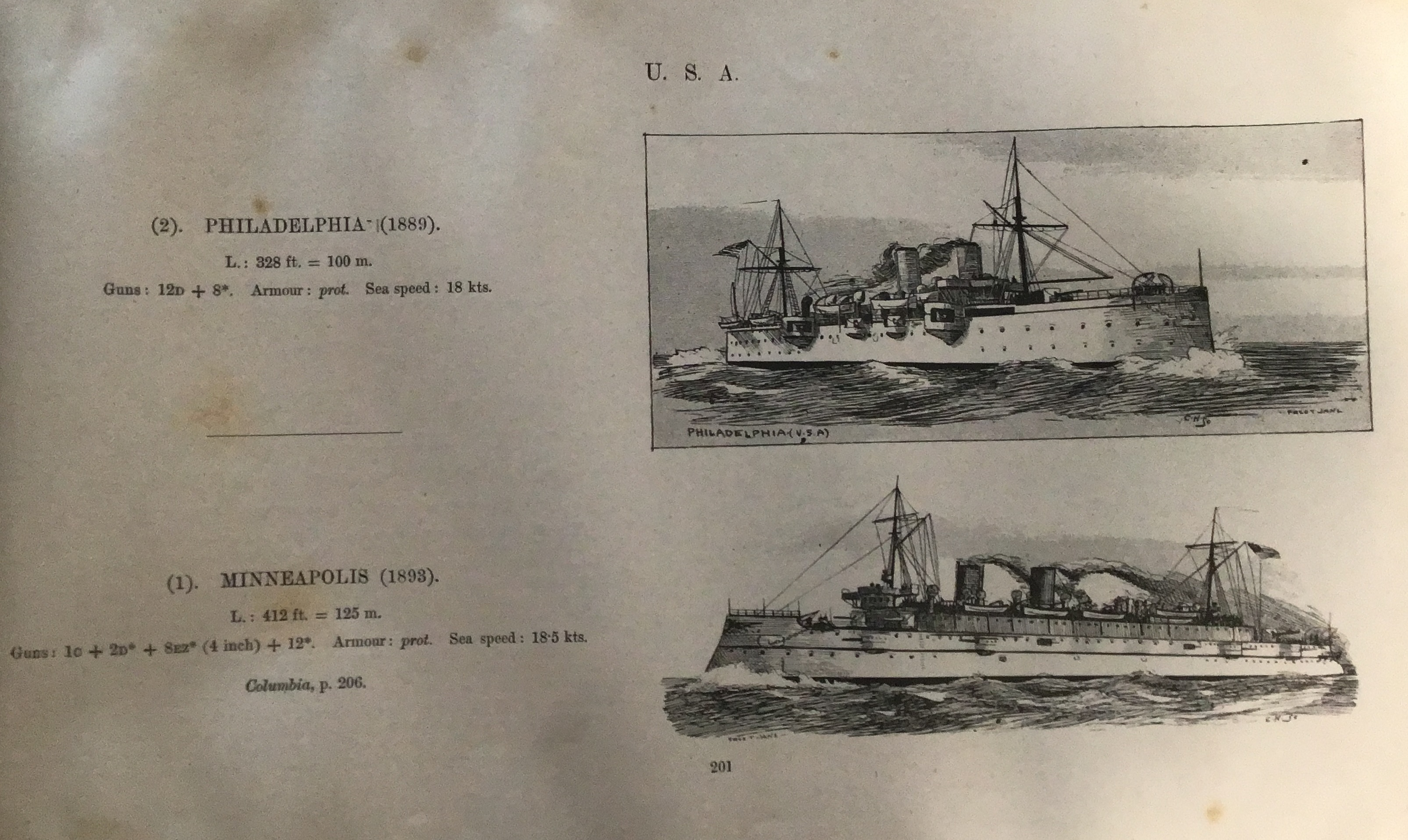
Fred T. Jane's illustrations on page 201 in the 1898 edition

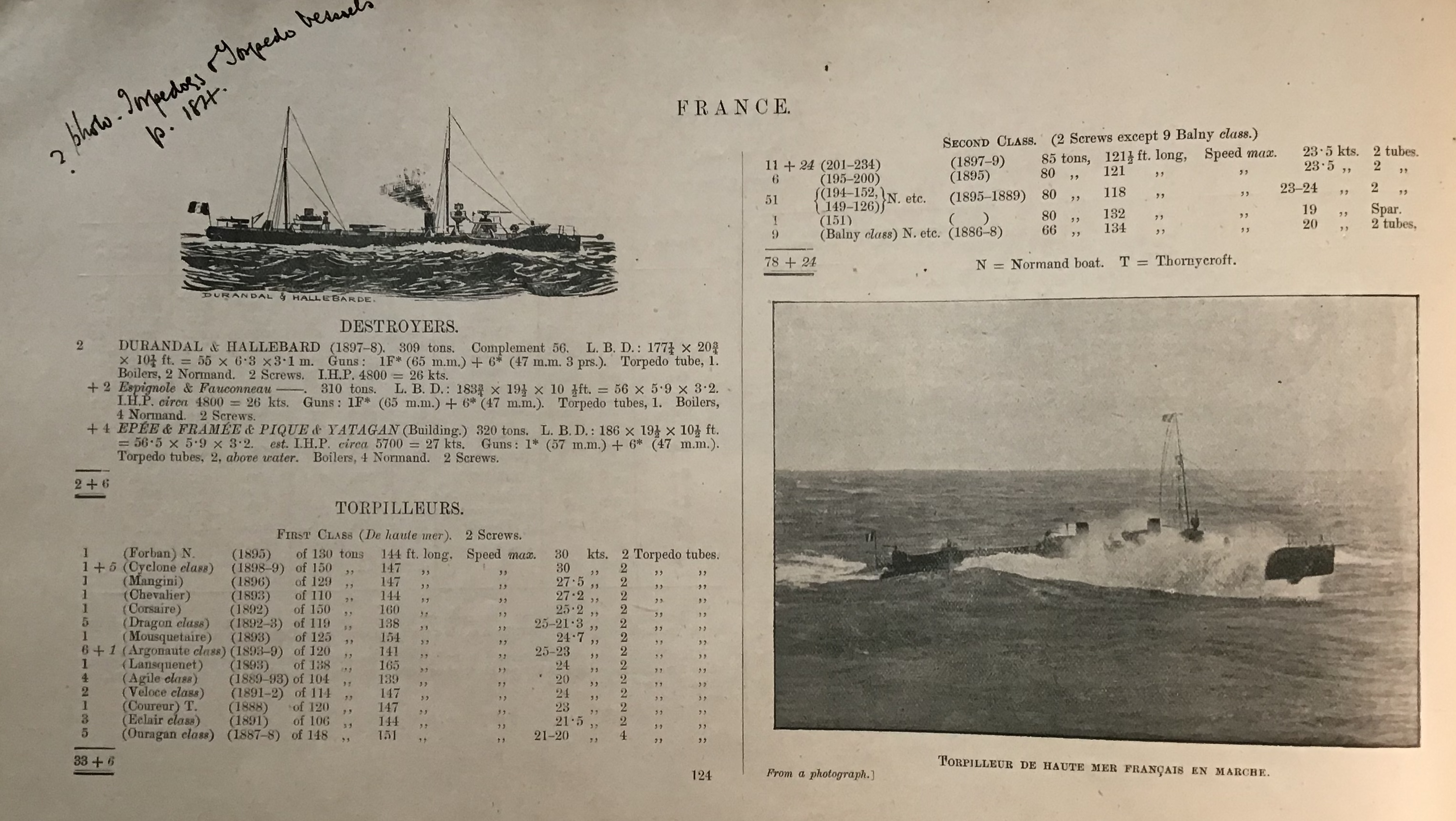
The first photo in Jane's Fighting Ships

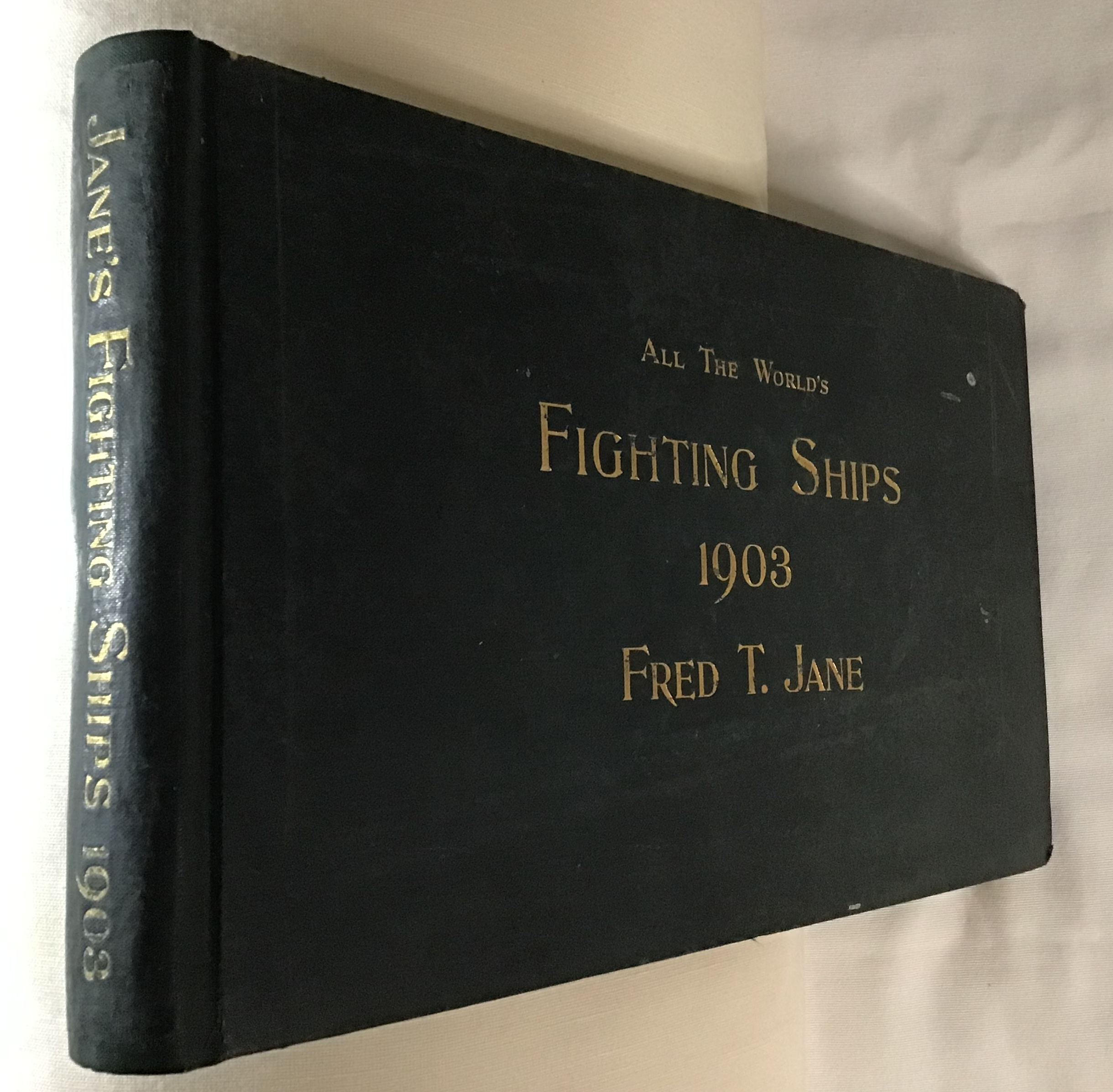
The 1903 edition

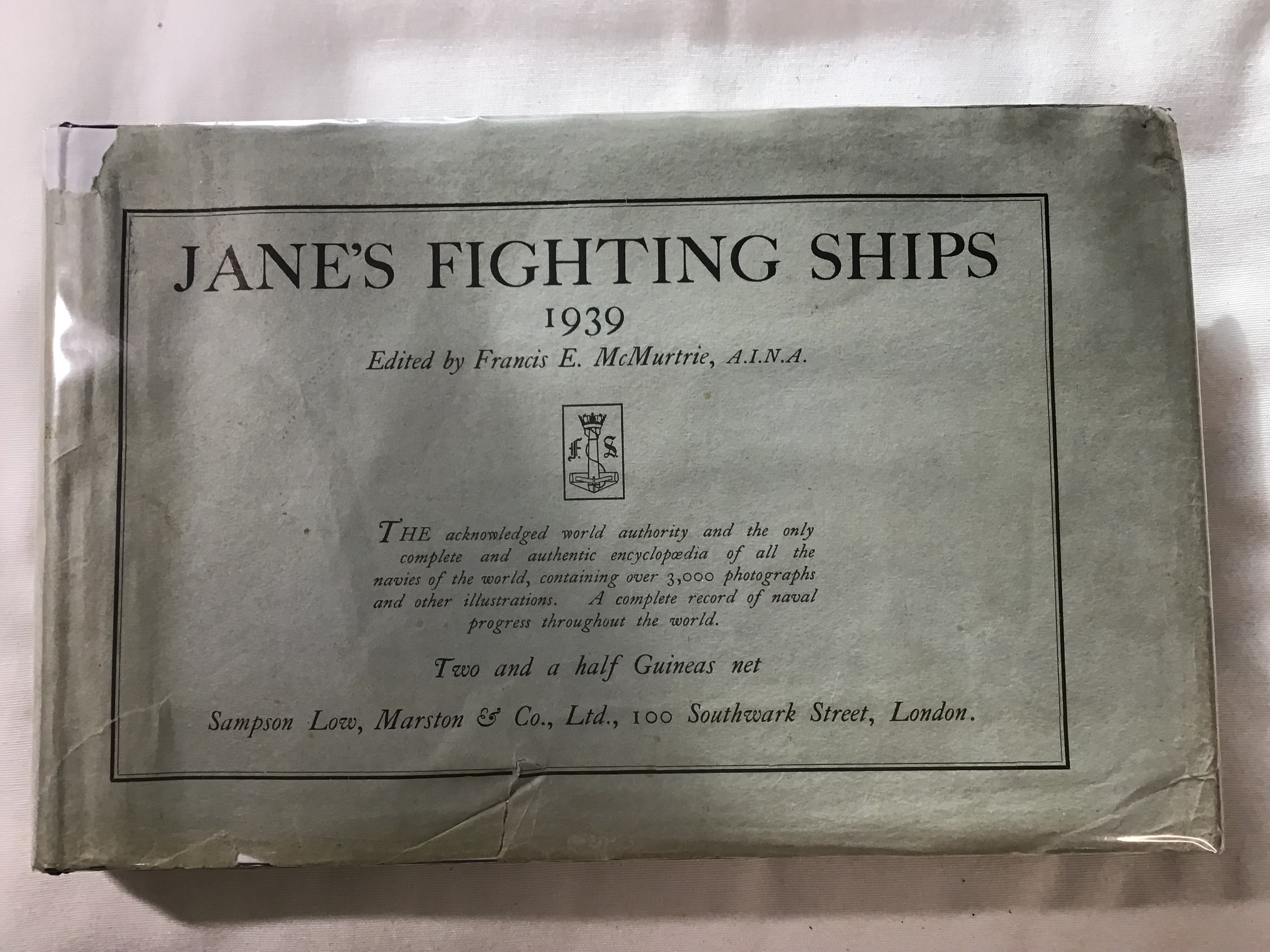
The 1939 edition in a dust jacket

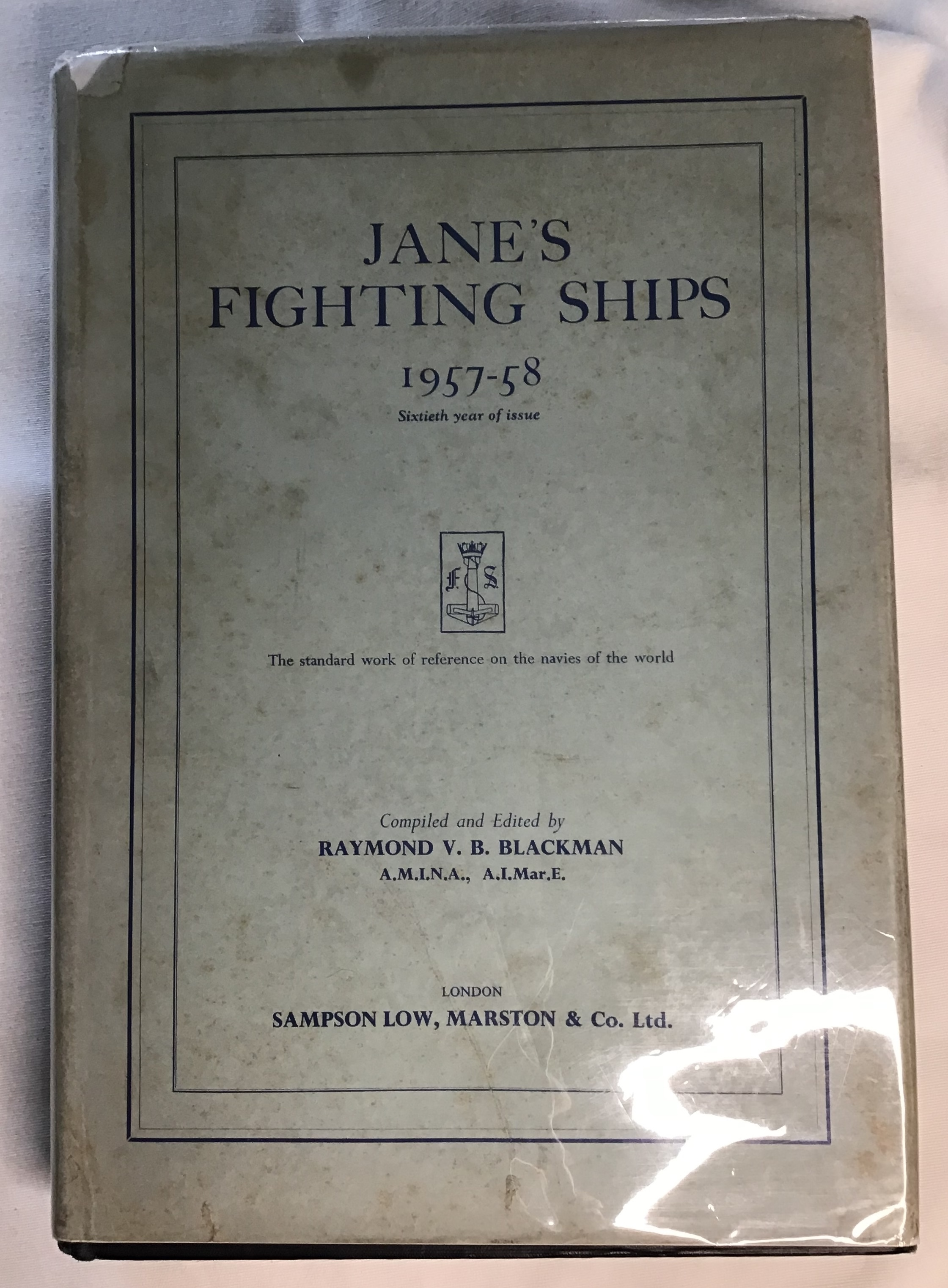
The first edition to come in portrait format, 1957–58

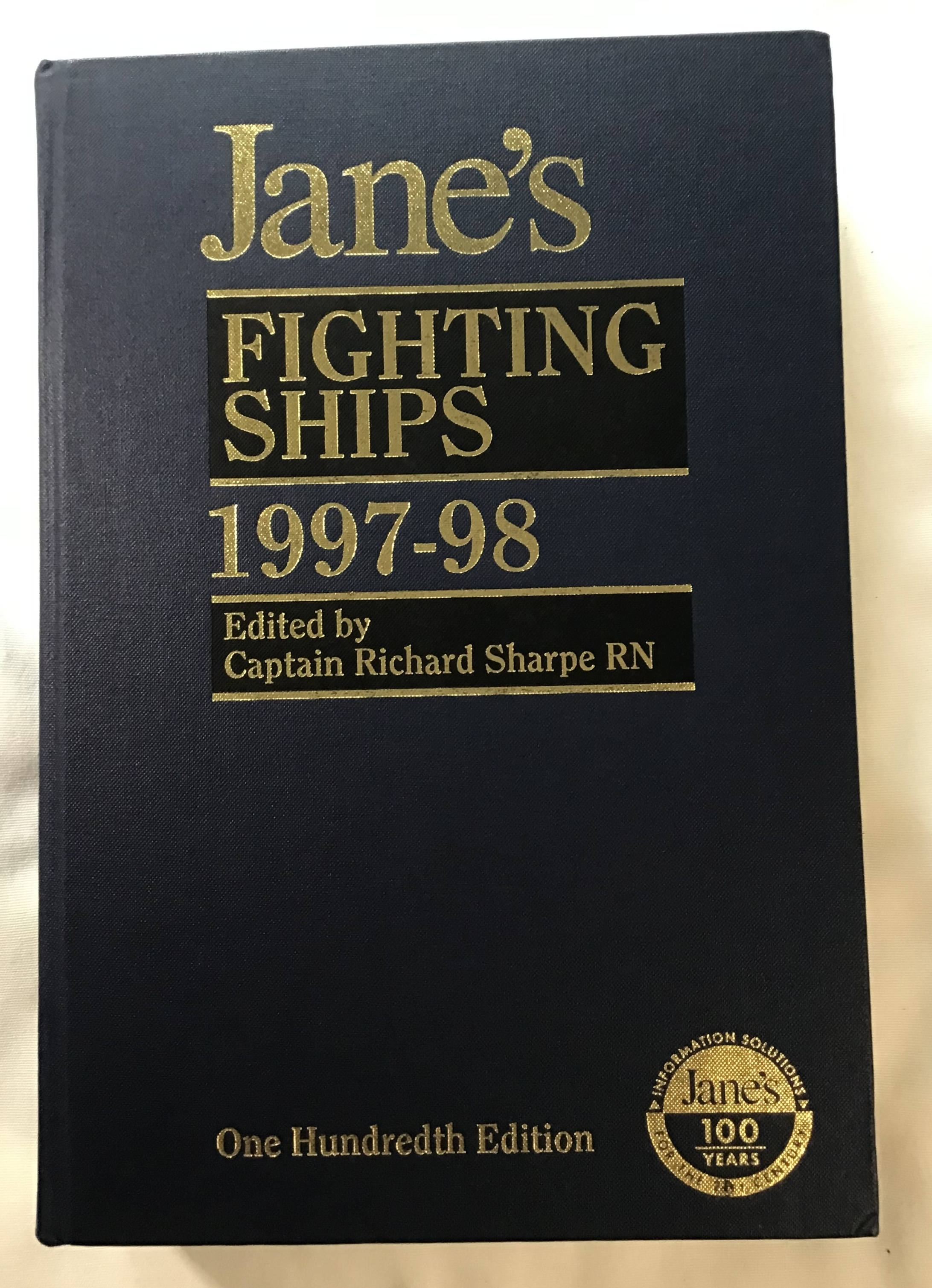
The 100th edition of 1997–98; color photographs were introduced to individual country listings

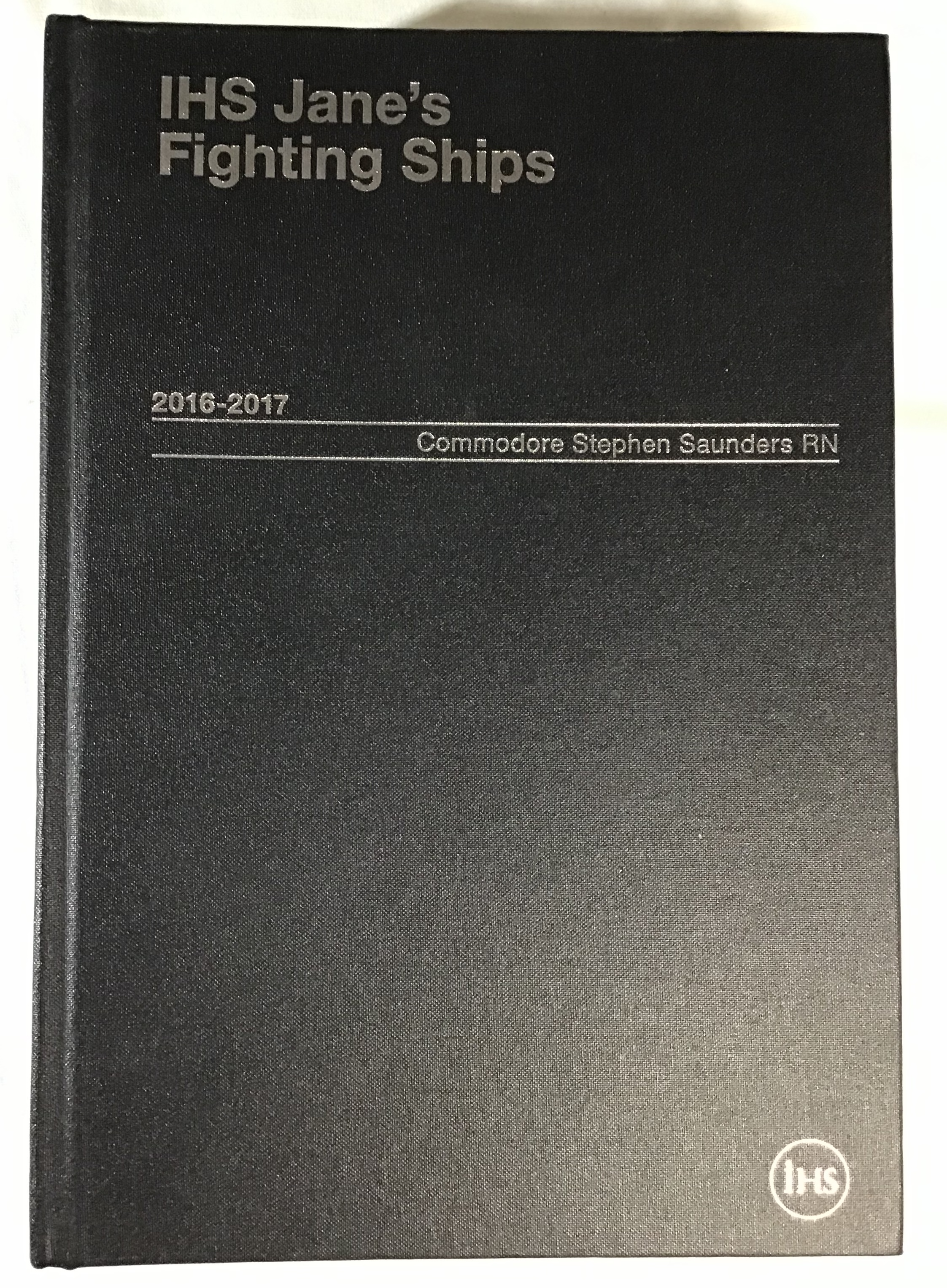
Cover of the 2016–17 edition

== See also ==
- Combat Fleets of the World

== Sources ==
- "Defence & Security Intelligence & Analysis". IHS Jane's 360.
- Brooks, Richard (1997). Fred T. Jane: An Eccentric Visionary. Coulsdon, Surrey, England: Jane's Information Group. ISBN 978-0710617514.
