= King Fahd Naval Academy =

Initial officer training establishment of the Royal Saudi Navy

Coordinates: 26.9586°N 49.6829°E

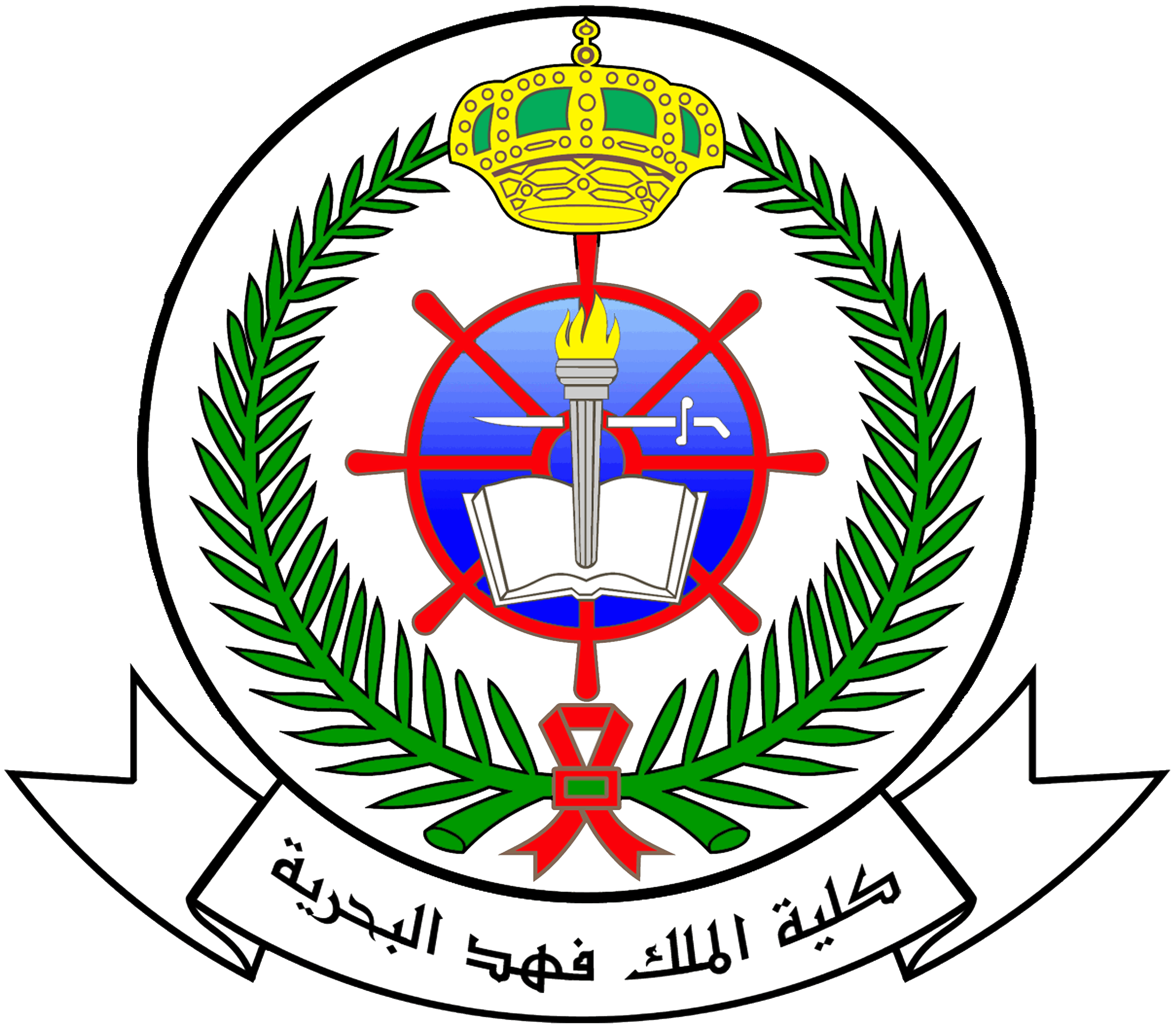
- Active: 19 April 1983 – present
- Country: Saudi Arabia
- Branch: Royal Saudi Navy
- Type: Training academy
- Role: Initial Officer training, Maritime training
- Ship's name: King Abdulaziz Naval Base
- Nickname(s): KFNA
- Motto(s): إيمان إخلاص فداء(Faith, Faithfulness, Redemption)

Commanders
- Ceremonial Chief: Faisal Alghofaili
- Commander: Rear Admiral Mohammed bin Zaid Al-Otaibi

The King Fahd Naval Academy (Arabic: كلية الملك فهد البحرية) is the main naval academy of the Kingdom of Saudi Arabia for the Royal Saudi Navy, located inside King Abdulaziz Naval Base in Jubail, which also hosts the navy's Western Fleet.

The academy was established in 1986 and is modeled on the Britannia Royal Naval College of the Royal Navy in Dartmouth, United Kingdom.

The academy maintains close relations with the Royal Navy, and on several occasions British instructors visit to train the Saudi cadets. Saudi naval cadets from the King Fahd Academy also frequently study at the Britannia Royal Naval College. Cadets from other GCC countries, such as Bahrain, also attend the King Fahd Naval Academy.
