= Saudi frigate Al Riyadh =

Al Riyadh class frigate

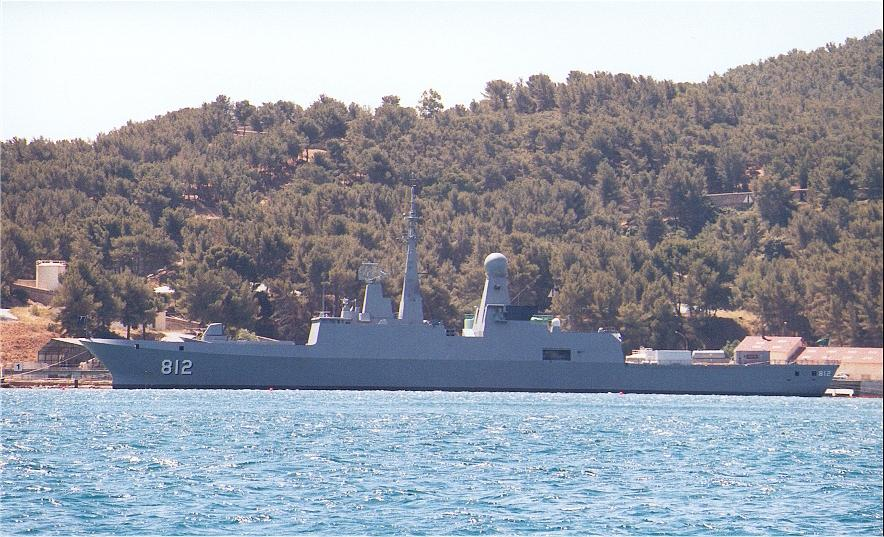
- Al Riyadh at Toulon in 2005

History

Saudi Arabia
- Name: Al Riyadh; (الرياض)
- Namesake: Al Riyadh
- Builder: Direction des Constructions Navales (DCNS), Lorient
- Laid down: 28 May 1999
- Launched: 1 August 2000
- Commissioned: 26 July 2002
- Home port: King Faisal Naval Base
- Identification: Pennant number: 812
- Status: Active

General characteristics
- Class & type: Al Riyadh-class frigate
- Displacement: 4,700 tonnes
- Length: 133 m (436 ft 4 in)
- Beam: 15.4 m (50 ft 6 in)
- Draught: 4.1 m (13 ft 5 in)
- Propulsion: 4 diesel SEMT Pielstick 12PA6V280 STC2, 21,000 hp (16,000 kW)
- Speed: 24.5 knots (45.4 km/h; 28.2 mph)
- Range: 7,000 nmi (13,000 km; 8,100 mi)
- Endurance: 50 days of food
- Boats & landing craft carried: 2 × ETN boats
- Capacity: 350 tonnes of fuel, 80 m^{3} (2,800 cu ft) of kerosene, 60 tonnes of potable water
- Complement: 12 officers; 68 petty officers; 61 enlisted
- Sensors & processing systems: 1 × DRBN34 navigation radar; 1 × DRBN34 landing radar; 1 × Air/Surface DRBV 15C sentry radar; 1 × firing control radar for the 100 mm gun; 1 × CN2 firing control radar; 1 × Saïgon ARBG 1 radio interceptor; 1 × ARBR 21 radar interceptor; 2 × Dagaie Mk2 AMGL-1C chaff launcher; 1 × AN/SLQ-25 Nixie tugged noise maker; 1 × Prairie-Masker noise reduction system; 1 × Integrated Shipboard Communication System ISCS (SNTI 120 ch.); 1 × SEAO/OPSMER Naval command support system; 1 × Syracuse II satellite transmission system; 1 × Inmarsat navigation system; 1 x BlueWatcher sonar (Surcouf only)
- Armament: Anti-ship; 16 × Aster anti-air missiles; 8 Exocet Anti-ship missiles; 4 x F17 torpedoes; Guns; 1 × 100 mm TR automatic gun
- Armour: On sensitive areas (munition magazine and control centre)
- Aircraft carried: 1 × helicopter (Panther or NH90)

Al Riyadh (812) is an Al Riyadh-class frigate of the Royal Saudi Navy.

== Development and design ==
Al Riyadh is an expanded anti-air version of the French La Fayette class, displacing about 4,700 t (5,181 short tons) and extended to 133 m (436 ft 4 in) in length.

The frigate's combat system, produced by Armaris (a Direction des Constructions Navales/Thales Group joint venture), is armed with Aster 15 surface-to-air missiles (SAM) launched from SYLVER vertical launchers (SYLVER - SYstème de Lancement VERtical). As with the La Fayette class, the primary offensive weapon is the anti-surface Exocet missile. The main gun of the Al Riyadh frigates is the OTO Melara 76 mm super-rapid firing gun replacing the modèle 100 TR automatic gun of the La Fayette class. There are also four aft-mounted 533 mm (21.0 in) torpedo tubes, firing DTCN F17 heavyweight anti-submarine torpedoes. Al Riyadh is capable of a maximum speed of ~46 kilometres per hour (25 kn; 29 mph) with a maximum range of 13,000 kilometres (7,019 nmi; 8,078 mi).

== Construction and career ==
Al Riyadh was launched on 1 August 2000 at the DCNS dockyard in Lorient and commissioned on 26 July 2002.

== Al Riyadh-class frigates ==
Three Al Riyadh class frigates have been built:

Al Riyadh (812)
the lead ship commissioned in 2002
Makkah (814)
commissioned in 2004
Al Dammam (816)
commissioned in 2004
