= King Abdulaziz Naval Base =

Saudi Arabian naval base

King Abdulaziz Naval Base
- قاعدة الملك عبد العزيز البحرية
- Jubail in Saudi Arabia

Site information
- Operator: Royal Saudi Navy
- Controlled by: Eastern Fleet

Location
- Shown within Saudi Arabia
- Coordinates: 26.98°N 49.69°E

Airfield information
- Identifiers: ICAO: OEJL
- Elevation: 8 feet (2 m) AMSL
Runways
Direction	Length and surface
15/33	8,022 ft (2,445 m) Asphalt
- Sources: DoD FLIP

The King Abdulaziz Naval Base (KANB; ICAO: OEJL; Arabic: قاعدة الملك عبد العزيز البحرية) is a naval base in Jubail, Eastern Province, Saudi Arabia. It is operated by the Royal Saudi Navy. The base serves as headquarters for the navy's Eastern Fleet, one of the two main formations of the Saudi navy, the second one being the Western Fleet. King Fahd Naval Academy is located on the installation.

== See also ==
- List of airports in Saudi Arabia
- List of things named after Saudi kings
- List of military installations in Saudi Arabia
