= La Fayette-class frigate =

French general purpose stealth frigates

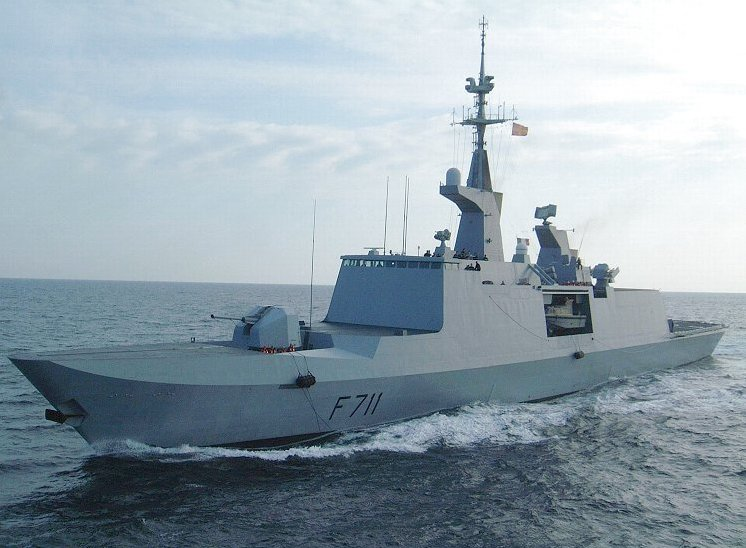
- The French frigate Surcouf

Class overview
- Name: La Fayette class
- Builders: DCNS
- Operators: French Navy; Royal Saudi Navy; Republic of China Navy; Republic of Singapore Navy
- Preceded by: Floréal class
- Succeeded by: Frégate de Défense et d'Intervention
- Subclasses: Al Riyadh class (Saudi Arabia); Formidable class (Singapore); Kang Ding class (Republic of China)
- In commission: 1996–present
- Completed: 20
- Active: 20

General characteristics
- Type: General purpose frigate
- Displacement: 3,200 t (3,100 long tons; 3,500 short tons); 3,800 t (3,700 long tons; 4,200 short tons) fully loaded
- Length: 125 m (410 ft 1 in)
- Beam: 15.4 m (50 ft 6 in)
- Draught: 4.1 m (13 ft 5 in)
- Propulsion: 4 diesel SEMT Pielstick 12PA6V280 STC2, 21,000 hp (16,000 kW)
- Speed: 25 kn (46 km/h; 29 mph)
- Range: 4,000 nmi (7,400 km; 4,600 mi) at 15 knots (28 km/h; 17 mph); 9,000 nmi (17,000 km; 10,000 mi) at 12 knots (22 km/h; 14 mph)
- Endurance: 50 days of food
- Boats & landing craft carried: 2 × ETN boats
- Capacity: 350 t (340 long tons; 390 short tons) of fuel, 80 m^{3} (2,800 cu ft) of kerosene, 60 t (59 long tons; 66 short tons) of potable water
- Complement: 164+; around 6 additional personnel on Courbet, La Fayette and Aconit post-upgrade
- Sensors & processing systems: 1 × DRBN34 navigation radar; 1 × DRBN34 landing radar; 1 × Air/Surface DRBV 15C sentry radar; 1 × Thales TAVITAC combat management system (fitted to Surcouf and Guépratte); 1 × SENIT FLF combat management system (replaced previous Thales TAVITAC CMS on La Fayette, Courbet and Aconit); 1 × firing control radar for the 100 mm gun; 1 × CN2 firing control radar; 1 × Saïgon ARBG 1 radio interceptor; 1 × ARBR 21 radar interceptor; 2 × Dagaie Mk2 AMGL-1C chaff launcher; CANTO anti-torpedo countermeasures (fitted to La Fayette in 2021-22 and Aconit in 2023; to be fitted to Courbet in due course); 1 × AN/SLQ-25 Nixie tugged noise maker; 1 × Prairie-Masker noise reduction system; 1 × Integrated Shipboard Communication System ISCS (SNTI 120 ch.); 1 × SEAO/OPSMER Naval command support system; 1 × Syracuse II satellite transmission system; 1 × Inmarsat navigation system; 1 × BlueWatcher sonar (Surcouf only); 1 × KingKlip Mk 2 hull-mounted sonar (fitted to Courbet, La Fayette and Aconit)
- Armament: Guns; 1 × 100 mm TR automatic gun; 2 × 20 mm modèle F2 guns; Anti-ship; 8 × Exocet MM40 block II anti-ship missiles (upgraded to capacity for Block 3c variant on Courbet, La Fayette and Aconit); CIWS; 1 × Crotale CN2 CIWS (fitted on Surcouf and Guépratte); 2 × 6 Sadral launchers with Mistral Mk 3 SAM/SSM (replaced Crotale on Courbet, La Fayette and Aconit); 2 x 2 manually operated Simbad/Mistral (reported fit to Surcouf in 2023)
- Armour: On sensitive areas (munition magazine and control centre)
- Aircraft carried: 1 × helicopter (Panther or NH90)

The La Fayette class (also known as FL-3000 for "Frégate Légère de 3,000 tonnes", or FLF for Frégate Légère Furtive) is a class of general purpose frigates built by DCNS in the 1980s and 1990s, operated by the French Navy and three other navies. Derivatives of the type are in service in the navies of Saudi Arabia, Singapore, and Republic of China.

The ships were originally known as "stealth frigates" due to their unique stealth design at the time. Their reduced radar cross section is achieved by a clean superstructure compared to conventional designs, angled sides and radar absorbent material, a composite material of wood and glass fibre as hard as steel, light, and resistant to fire. Most modern combat ships built since the introduction of the La Fayette class have followed the same principles of stealth.

All information gathered by the onboard sensors is managed by the Information Processing System, the electronic brain of the operation centre of the ship. It is completed by an electronic command aid system.

The ships are designed to accommodate a 10-tonne (9.8-long-ton; 11-short-ton) helicopter in the Panther or NH90 range (though they are also capable of operating the Super Frelon and similar heavy helicopters). These helicopters can carry anti-ship missiles AM39 or AS15, and they can be launched during sea state five or six due to the Samahé helicopter handling system. France ordered five ships of the La Fayette class in 1988, the last of which entered service in 2001. In the French Navy, they are being incrementally superseded in "first-rank" functions by five frégates de taille intermédiaire (FTI, "intermediate size frigates") from 2025.

== French version ==
=== Background ===
In the late 1980s, the French Navy (Marine Nationale) started the studies for frigates adapted to low-intensity conflicts in the post–Cold War era. The ships were to serve in the large French exclusive economic zone (EEZ), be adapted to humanitarian operations or low-intensity operations in support of land troops, and replace the aging D'Estienne d'Orves-class avisos, which tended to prove too focused on naval operations and were ill-suited for joint operations.

Conventional warships used in low-intensity or humanitarian relief operations proved costly, with their heavy equipment and large crew. Hence came the requirement for lightly armed frigates with economical engines and small crew. In Italy, the same requirements led to the development of the Cassiopea and Minerva type corvettes, built according to both civilian and military standards. These ships were limited to 1,300 tonnes (1,300 long tons; 1,400 short tons) because the limited size and depth of the Mediterranean Sea and the proximity of the homeland. The French Navy, on the other hand, had to be present in overseas territories, bases and EEZ. To be enduring enough, the ships had to reach 3,000 tonnes (3,000 long tons; 3,300 short tons), the size of a frigate. The larger displacement allows combining strong firepower (like the Minerva class) and a capacity for a medium helicopter (like the Cassiopea class), along with a good autonomy and seaworthiness.

The first type of ships built on these principles were the Floréal-class frigates, built on civilian standards, with a limited armament, and carrying a medium helicopter. These ships are high endurance units designed to be operated in overseas territories in the Caribbean Sea, Polynesia, and New Caledonia and the EEZ, where the likelihood of a naval threat is low. The speed is limited to 20 knots (37 km/h; 23 mph) because of the low-power engines which emphasised autonomy and reliability. To fight pirates in fast rigid-hulled inflatable boats, the Floréals rely on their onboard helicopter and marine detachment.

The niche for more hostile environments is covered by the La Fayette type, designed to operate in complex zones like the Indian Ocean or Djibouti. These ships were to be able to secure the EEZ, but also to operate in naval groups or intelligence gathering missions. The intended role for the ships was in fact very varied, because the experience of the C.70 class, with an intended 20 ships cut down to only nine (the seven Georges Leygues-class frigates and two Cassard-class frigates) had taught that project downsizing and reorganisation could lead to badly balanced naval capabilities. The new ships were to benefit from breakthroughs in stealth ("furtivité") achieved by the DCN in the 1980s.

It took several years to refine the concept, and the first ship was eventually launched in 1992, two years after the final design was completed. Weapon system testing took place in 1994, and particularly extensive trials were undertaken to prove the structure of the ship under a wide range of conditions. La Fayette was eventually commissioned in March 1996.

=== Stealth ===
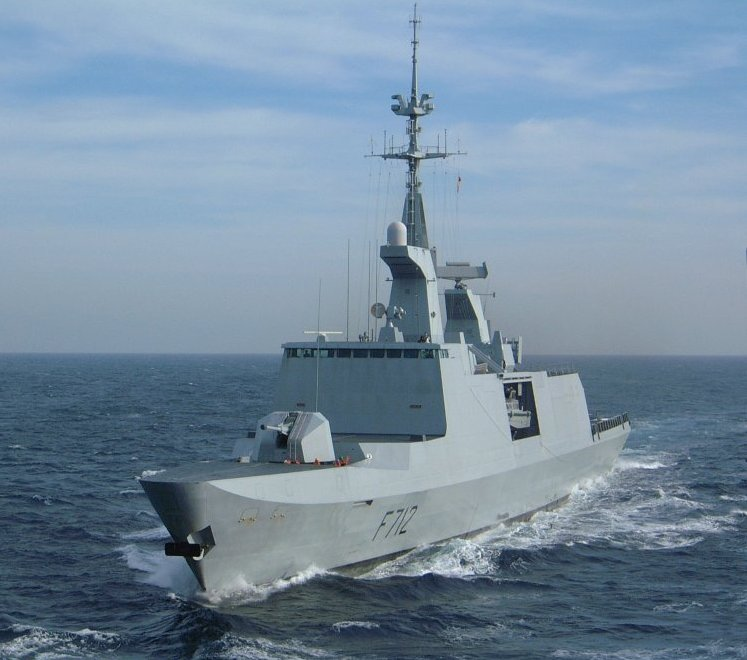
The La Fayette type features very clean superstructures, as Courbet demonstrates.

At the time of their commissioning, the units of the La Fayette class were the state of the art in stealth for warships. The shape of the hull and the superstructures is devised for the optimal reduction of the radar signature. Stealth is achieved with inclined flanks, as few vertical lines as possible, and very clean lines and superstructures: stairs and mooring equipment are internal, and prominent structures are covered by clear surfaces. The superstructures are built using radar-absorbent synthetic materials.

Their radar cross-section is equivalent to that of a large fishing boat, which can make camouflage among civilian ships possible; or that of a much less capable corvette, which could lead an enemy to underestimate the capabilities of the ship. In case of a direct attack, the small radar signature helps evade enemy missiles and fire control systems. The La Fayettes are also equipped with jammers that can generate false radar images, as well as decoy launchers.

Thanks to the adoption of low-power diesel motors and a special heat dissipation system, the La Fayette ships have a low thermal signature. The usual funnel is replaced with a small sets of pipes, aft of the mast, which cool the exit gas before it is released. The ships usually operate in warm areas, which further decreases the thermal contrast with the environment.

The magnetic signature is reduced by the presence of a demagnetisation belt.

The acoustic signature is minimized by mounting the engines on elastomeric supports, which minimize vibration transfers to the hull, and by rubber coatings on the propellers. The La Fayettes are equipped with the Prairie Masker active acoustic camouflage system, which generates small bubbles from underneath the hull to confuse sonars.

=== Construction ===
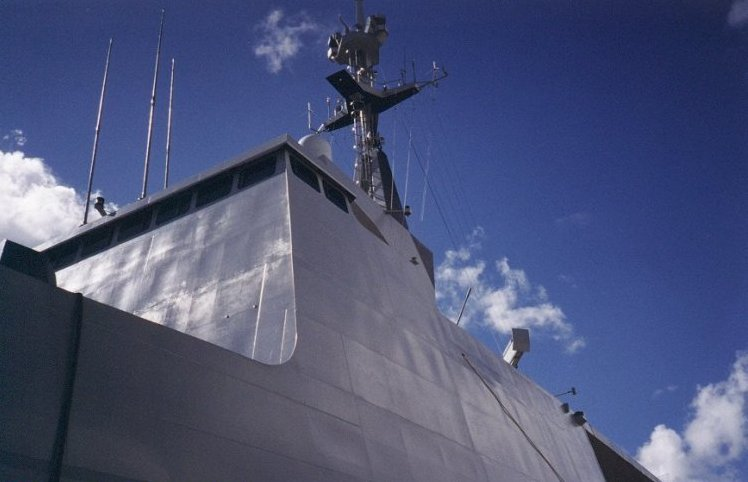
Superstructure of a La Fayette blends into the hull with only a slight change in inclination.

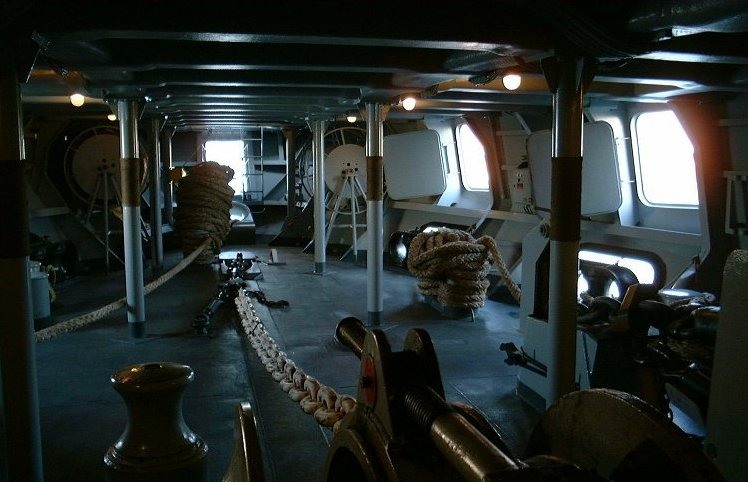
Cable deck of Surcouf, covered to reduce the radar signature; seamanship evolutions are completed through openings in the hull

The superstructure is made of light alloy and glass-reinforced plastic, which allow a reduction in top weight. This provides adequate but sub-optimal resistance to fire. Vital zones are armoured in Kevlar, and important systems are redundant. The crew is protected against biological, chemical, and nuclear environments.

The ships were built with a modular inner structure from eleven prefabricated modules which were completed at the factory, delivered to the shipyard and assembled there. This technique results in a construction time of less than two years.

The hull has a pronounced angle at the stem, with a short forecastle that integrates directly into the superstructure. The ship's sides have a negative inclination of ten degrees. The single anchor is located exactly on the stem, into which it is completely recessed. The deck where the seamanship equipment and capstans are installed is internal in order to hide it from radar.

The superstructure is built in one piece and directly integrates into the hull, with only a change in inclination. A platform is located between the main gun and the bridge. The superstructure runs continuously down to the helicopter hangar, on top of which short-range anti-aircraft Crotale missiles were initially installed (being replaced on three ships in the early 2020s with the SADRAL/Mistral system).

The ships feature two masts. The main mast has a pyramidal structure which integrates funnels and supports the antenna of the Syracuse military communications satellite system, while the second supports the main radar.

=== Life extension upgrades ===
Three of the French Navy frigates (La Fayette, Courbet and Aconit) were selected to receive mid-life upgrades extending their useful service lives into the early 2030s. The three frigates are receiving KingKlip Mk2 hull-mounted sonar to incorporate an anti-submarine capability, modernized point air defence systems (consisting of two renovated SADRAL launchers, removed from the retired Georges Leygues class, and operating Mistral Mk3 SAMs/SSMs) as well as other improvements including the ability to carry the latest version of the Exocet anti-ship missile and CANTO anti-torpedo countermeasures (initially fitted first to La Fayette when she received her upgrade in 2021–22). The upgrades increase the displacement of the ships by some 80 tonnes (79 long tons; 88 short tons) and will permit the three ships to operate through the 2020s and be retired between 2031 and 2034. The first vessel, Courbet, began her conversion refit in October 2020. She returned to sea in June 2021. In October 2021, La Fayette began her planned refit and in November 2022 was declared operational again upon its completion. In February 2023 Aconit, the last of the frigates to be upgraded, began her life extension refit. She was relaunched in July and was expected to be fully operational again in 2024.

The other two vessels of the class (Surcouf and Guépratte) were scheduled to undergo more modest structural and technical upgrades (with the elderly Crotale SAM to be removed), and be withdrawn from service in 2027 and 2031 respectively. With somewhat reduced general purpose capability, it had been anticipated that the two ships would be re-assigned to offshore patrol duties for the remainder of their service life. Initially there was some uncertainty as to whether the change in role would take place. However, it was later reported that Guépratte and her sister ship Surcouf would undertake the offshore patrol role in order to fill a gap created by the delayed arrival of the Patrouilleurs Hauturiers OPVs. It was also subsequently reported that both frigates would be extended in service for five years, to 2032 and 2036 respectively.

The La Fayette-class units are being incrementally complemented, and will be eventually replaced, in first rank functions in the French Navy by the FDI-class frigates.

=== Ships ===
La Fayette class
Number	Ship	Builder	Laid down	Launched	Commissioned	Status
F 710	La Fayette	DCN Lorient		13 June 1992	22 March 1996	In active service
F 711	Surcouf	DCN Lorient		3 July 1993	7 February 1997	In active service
F 712	Courbet	DCN Lorient		12 March 1994	1 April 1997	In active service
F 713	Aconit	DCN Lorient		8 June 1997	3 June 1999	In active service
F 714	Guépratte	DCN Lorient		3 March 1999	27 October 2001	In active service

== Export ==
=== Al Riyadh class: Saudi Arabia ===
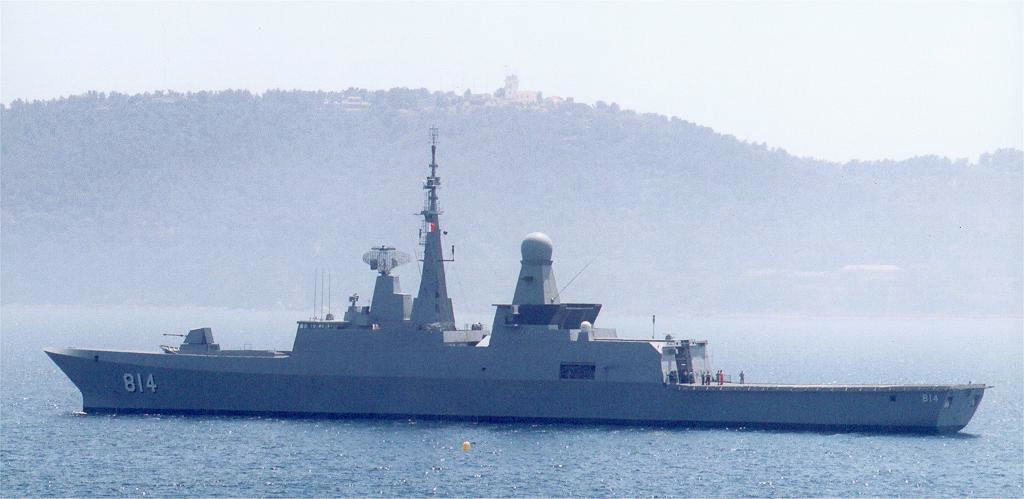
Saudi Arabian ship Makkah (814)

The three Al Riyadh-class ships are an expanded anti-air version of the French La Fayette class, displacing about 4,700 tonnes (4,600 long tons; 5,200 short tons) and extended to 133 m (436 ft 4 in) in length.

The ships' combat systems are produced by Armaris (a DCN/Thales joint venture) and are armed with the Aster 15 missile. The Aster missiles use the DCN SYLVER launcher. As with the La Fayette class the primary offensive weapon is the anti-surface Exocet missile. The ships' main gun is the Oto Melara 76 mm/62 Super Rapid gun replacing the 100 mm TR automatic gun. There are also four 533 mm (21.0 in) aft torpedo tubes. The ship is armed with the DCNS F17 heavyweight anti-submarine torpedo.

The ships are capable of a maximum speed of 24.5 knots (45.4 km/h; 28.2 mph) with a maximum range of 7,000 nautical miles (13,000 km; 8,100 mi).

Al Riyadh class
Number	Ship	Builder	Laid down	Launched	Commissioned	Status
812	Al Riyadh	DCN Lorient			26 July 2002	In active service
814	Makkah	DCN Lorient			23 April 2004	In active service
816	Al Dammam	DCN Lorient			23 October 2004	In active service

=== Formidable class: Singapore ===
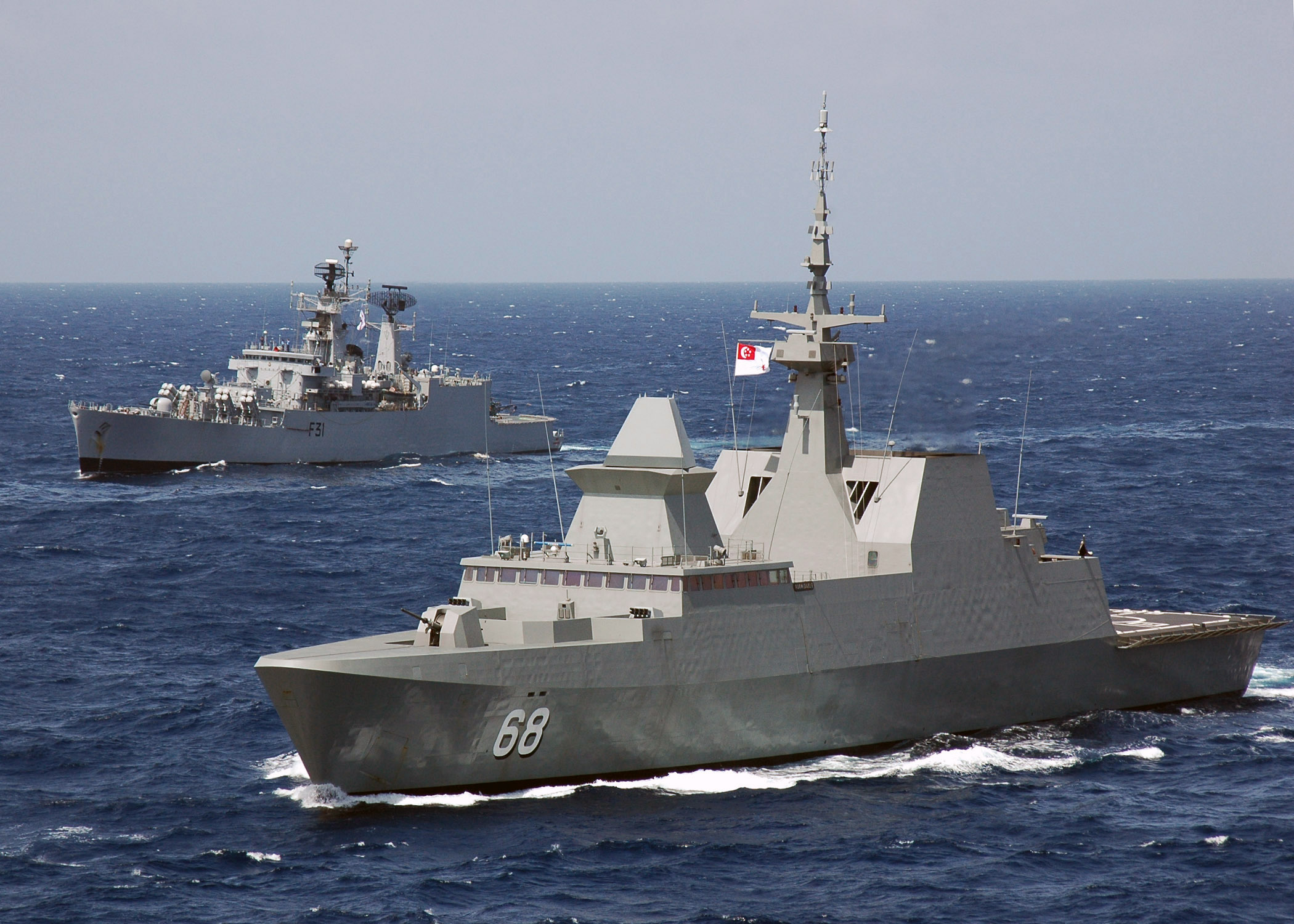
RSS Formidable

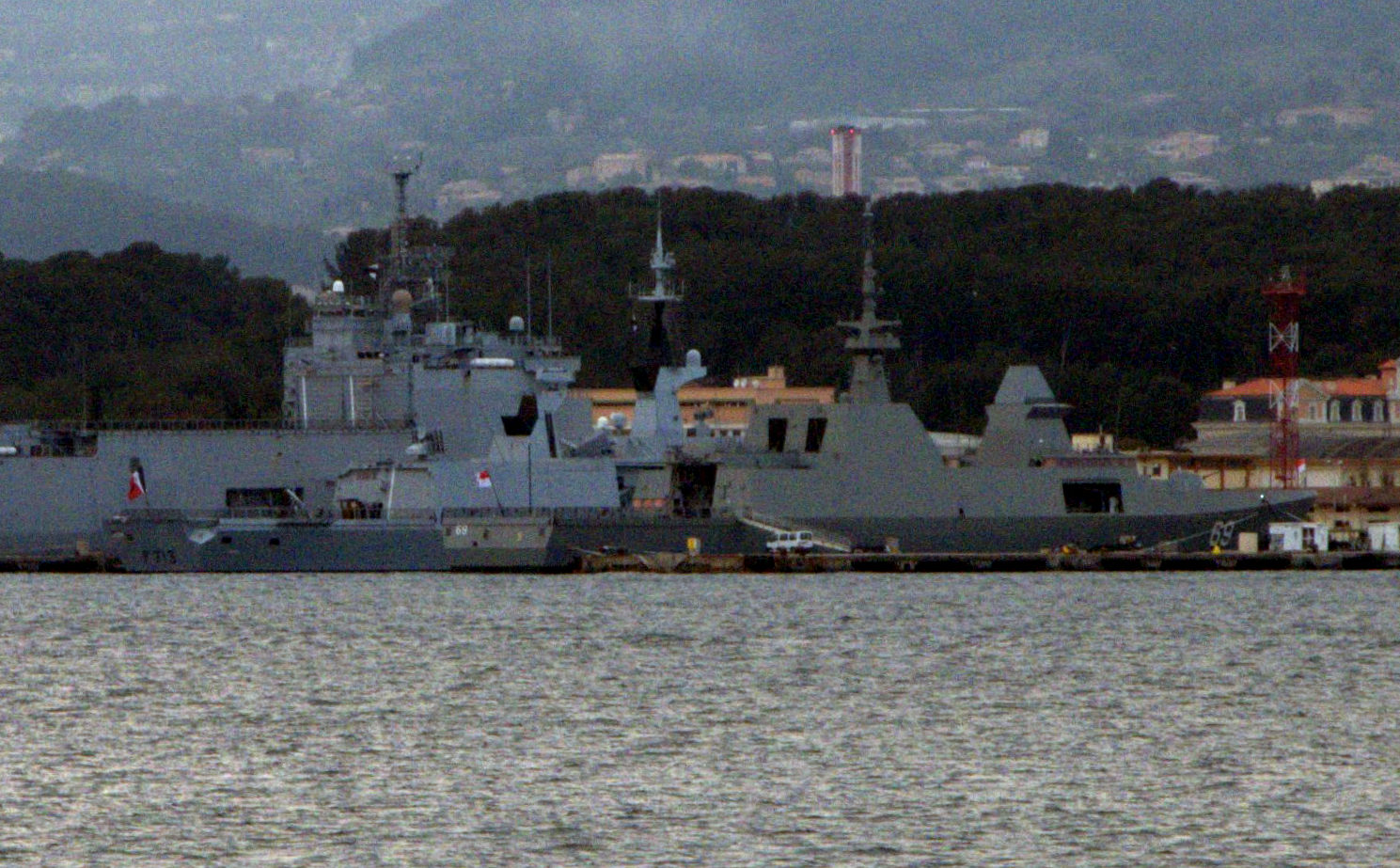
The frigates Aconit and RSS Intrepid side by side, illustrating the differences in their superstructures

The Republic of Singapore Navy's six Formidable-class frigates are of comparable size to the La Fayette class but differ from that class and the Saudi Al Riyadh class in the armament carried: in place of the Exocet is the Boeing Harpoon. The main gun is a stealth cupola equipped with an Oto Melara 76 mm gun replacing the 100 mm TR automatic gun. The Formidable class also uses the SYLVER launcher/Aster missile combination.

The first ship, RSS Formidable, was built by DCN, while the remaining ships were constructed by Singapore Technologies Marine.

Anti-submarine capability includes S-70B Seahawk helicopters.

Maximum speed is 27 kn (50 km/h; 31 mph), making it the fastest variant. The ships have a maximum range of 4,200 nmi (7,800 km; 4,800 mi).

Formidable class
Number	Ship	Builder	Laid down	Launched	Commissioned	Status
68	Formidable	DCNS	2002	7 January 2004	5 May 2007	In active service
69	Intrepid	ST Engineering (Marine)		3 July 2004	5 February 2008	In active service
70	Steadfast	ST Engineering (Marine)		15 July 2005	5 February 2008	In active service
71	Tenacious	ST Engineering (Marine)		15 July 2005	5 February 2008	In active service
72	Stalwart	ST Engineering (Marine)		9 December 2005	16 January 2009	In active service
73	Supreme	ST Engineering (Marine)		9 May 2006	16 January 2009	In active service

=== Kang Ding class: Republic of China ===
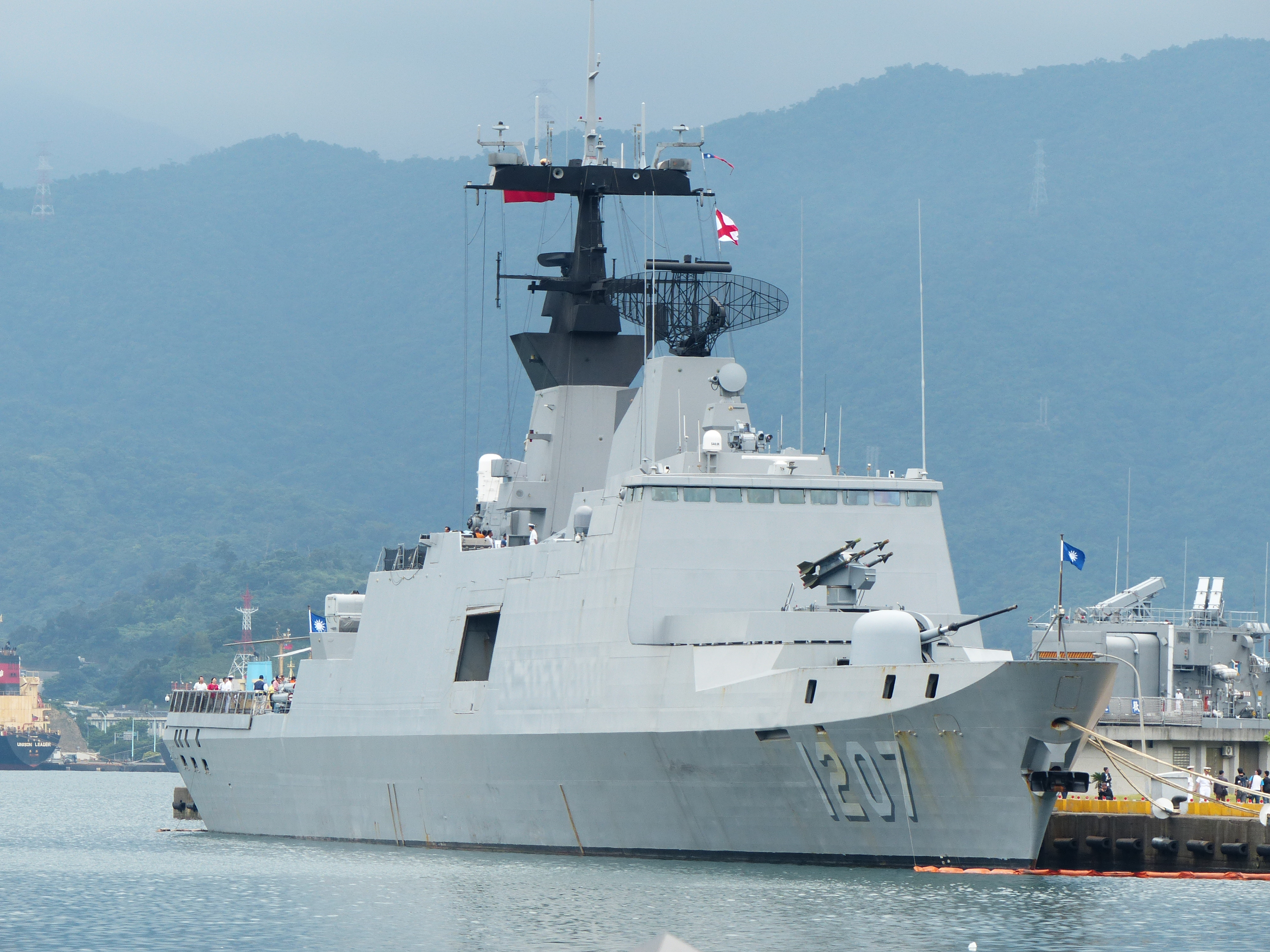
The Taiwanese frigate Wu Chang in 2013

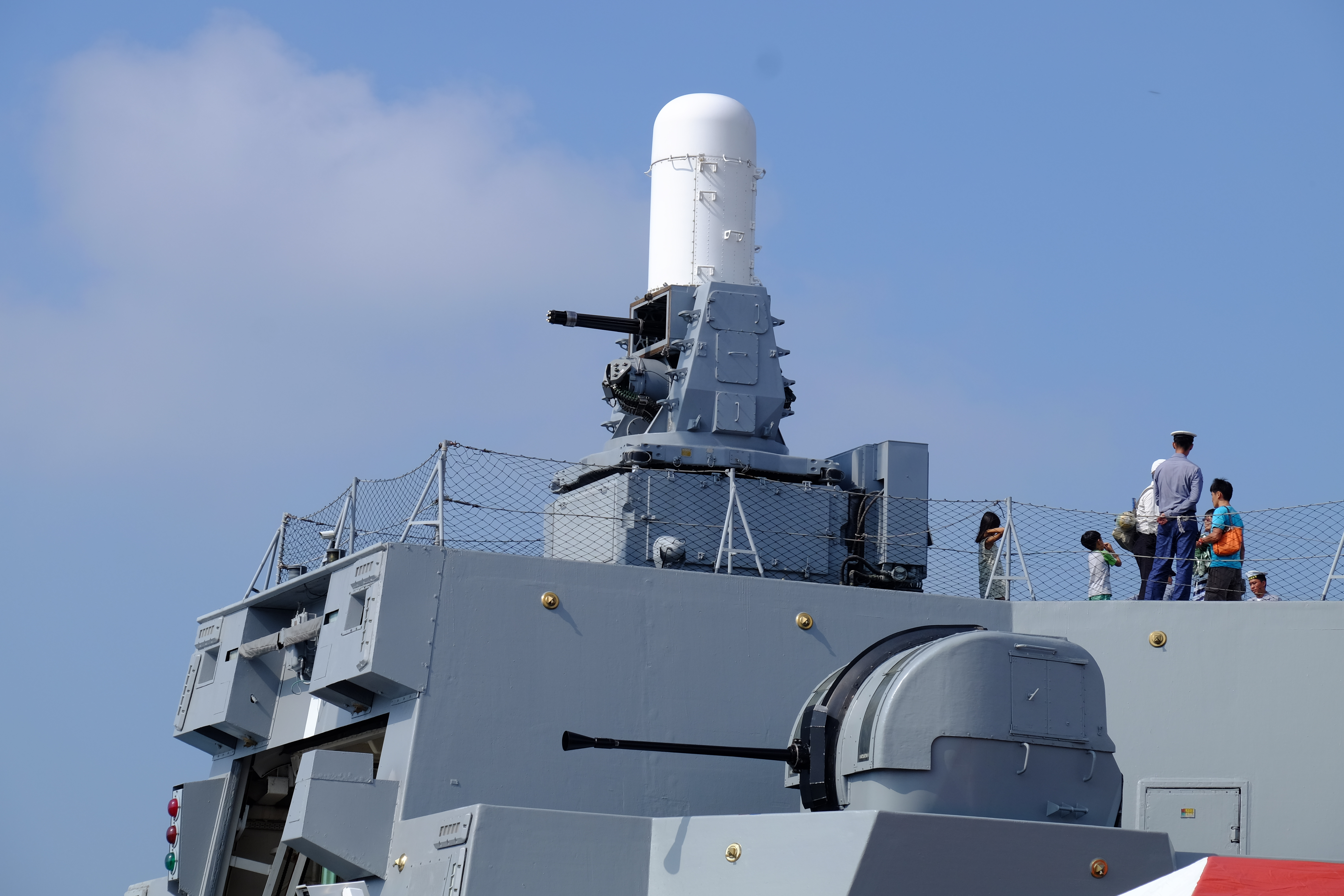
Phalanx CIWS and Bofors 40 mm L70 gun aboard ROCN Di Hua

As the Republic of China's defensive stance is aimed towards the Taiwan Strait, the Republic of China Navy is constantly seeking to upgrade its anti-submarine warfare capabilities. The US$1.75 billion agreement with France in the early 1990s was an example of this procurement strategy: the six ships are configured for both ASW and surface attack. The Exocet was replaced by Hsiung Feng II anti-ship missile and the AAW weapon is the Sea Chaparral. The main gun is an Oto Melara 76 mm/62 mk 75 gun, similar to its Singaporean counterparts, the Formidable-class frigates.

In 2021 it was reported that the Republic of China would upgrade the Kang Ding class. It was reported that the MIM-72 Chaparral surface-to-air missile defence system will be replaced by the indigenous Sky Sword II. It was also reported that the upgrade of the battle system will also be involved.

The class's maximum speed is 25 knots (46 km/h; 29 mph) with a maximum range of 4,000 nmi (7,400 km; 4,600 mi).

The class's Mk 75 main guns have been upgraded and have an improved firing rate of 100 rounds a minute.

Starting in 2025, the Kang Ding-class frigates will undergo progressive air-defense system upgrades, replacing MIM-72 missiles with Sea Sword II missiles housed in vertical launch systems.

Kang Ding class
Number	Ship	Builder	Laid down	Launched	Commissioned	Status
PFG-1202	Kang Ding (康定)	DCNS	1993	22 March 1994	24 May 1996	In active service
PFG-1203	Si Ning (西寧)	DCNS	1994	5 November 1994	5 October 1996	In active service
PFG-1205	Kun Ming (昆明)	DCNS	1994	13 May 1995	26 February 1997	In active service
PFG-1206	Di Hua (迪化)	DCNS	1995	27 November 1995	14 August 1997	In active service
PFG-1207	Wu Chang (武昌)	DCNS	1995	27 November 1995	16 December 1997	In active service
PFG-1208	Chen De (承德)	DCNS	1995	2 August 1996	19 March 1998	In active service

== See also ==
- List of frigate classes in service

Equivalent frigates of the same era

- Brahmaputra class
- Hydra class
- Type 053H3
- Barbaros class
- Lekiu class

== Bibliography ==
- Jordan, John; Moulin, Jean (2021). "The 'Stealth' Frigates of the La Fayette Class". In Jordan, John (ed.). Warship 2021. Oxford, UK: Osprey Publishing. pp. 81–98. ISBN 978-1-4728-4779-9.
