= Eastern Fleet (disambiguation) =

Eastern Fleet may refer to:

- East Indies Fleet, also known as The Eastern Fleet, a fleet of the Royal Navy which existed between 1941 and 1952
- Eastern Fleet (India), a Naval fleet of the Indian Navy
- Eastern Fleet (Saudi Arabia), one of the two main fleets of Saudi Arabian Navy
- Eastern Fleet (horse), an American Thoroughbred racehorse
