= Western Fleet =

Western Fleet may refer to:

- Western Fleet (India)
- Western Fleet (Saudi Arabia)
- Western Fleet (United Kingdom)
