= SA Navy =

SA Navy or S.A. Navy may refer to:

- Royal Saudi Navy
- South African Navy
