= Royal Saudi Marine Forces =

Royal Saudi Marine Force
- مشاة البحرية السعودية
- Founded: 1990/91–present
- Country: Saudi Arabia
- Type: Marines
- Role: Amphibious warfare Anti-tank warfare Armoured reconnaissance Artillery observer Bomb disposal Border security Combined arms Coastal defence Counter-battery fire Counterinsurgency; Desert warfare Force protection Indirect fire Military engineering Military logistics Naval boarding Raiding; Reconnaissance; Screening; Urban warfare
- Size: Brigades (3,000 marines) (2024)
- Part of: Royal Saudi Navy
- Engagements: Gulf War; Saudi-led intervention in the Yemeni civil war

The Royal Saudi Marine Forces, also called the Royal Saudi Marines (Arabic: مشاة البحرية السعودية), are the marine corps component of the Royal Saudi Navy. As of 2024 there were 3,000 marines organized into two brigades, and they are equipped with Pegaso BMR armored personnel carriers.

The Royal Saudi Marine Forces responsible for amphibious warfare, combined arms, coastal defence, counterinsurgency, desert warfare, maneuver warfare, military logistics management for prepare amphibious warfare operations, providing security at naval base or shore stations, reconnaissance in the areas of responsibility, support border security, support naval boarding, and urban warfare.

== History ==
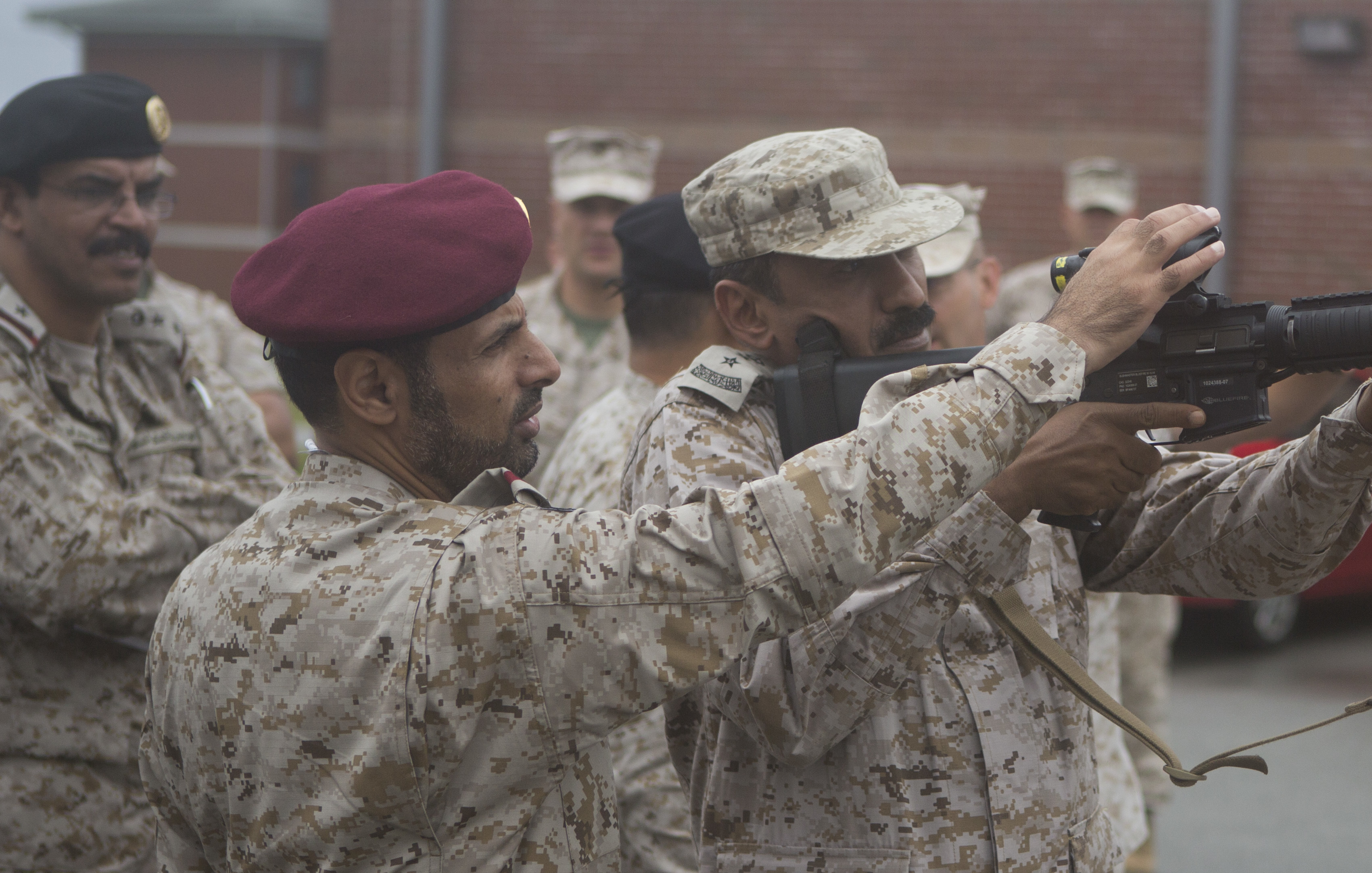
Royal Saudi Marines visiting the USMC School of Infantry East, 2015

The Royal Saudi Marines were established not very long before the Gulf War of 1990–91, and at the time they lacked equipment. One battalion was located on the eastern coast of Saudi Arabia and took part in the war alongside the U.S. 1st Marine Division (1st MARDIV). The division's 3rd Marine Regiment also trained with the Royal Saudi Marine battalion. It had a role in the Battle of Khafji.

As of 1997, there were 1,500 Royal Saudi Marines, organized into two battalions, and equipped with 140 BTR-60P amphibious armored personnel carriers. There were plans for the force to be increased to 2,400 marines. As of the year 2000, according to some sources, the RSMF increased to 8,500 marines, and this reached 10,000 by 2008.

During a border conflict between Saudi Arabia and the Houthi movement in Yemen in 2009, there was a report that marines may have been deployed to the border to border security and counterinsurgency in the areas. As of 2014, there were two marine battalions stationed at Ras al-Ghar.

In 2024, the Royal Saudi Marines consisted of 3,000 personnel and were equipped with 135 Pegaso BMR armored personnel carriers.

== Sources ==
- Cordesman, Anthony (1997). Saudi Arabia: Guarding the Desert Kingdom. Westview Press. ISBN 0-8133-3241-9.
- Cordesman, Anthony (2009). Saudi Arabia: National Security in a Troubled Region. Center for Strategic and International Studies. ISBN 978-0-313-38076-1.
- IISS (2024). The Military Balance 2024. London: Taylor & Francis. ISBN 978-1-040-05115-3.
- Westermeyer, Paul W. (2014). U.S. Marines in the Gulf War, 1990–1991. Quantico: Marine Corps History Division. ISBN 978-0-16-092407-1.
