= Saudi corvette Al Diriyah =

Al Jubail class corvette

History

Saudi Arabia
- Name: Al Diriyah; (الدرعية)
- Namesake: Al Diriyah
- Builder: Navantia, San Fernando
- Laid down: 2019
- Launched: 14 November 2020
- Identification: Pennant number: 830
- Status: In active service

General characteristics
- Class & type: Avante 2000 corvette
- Displacement: 2,419 tons
- Length: 99 m (324 ft 10 in)
- Beam: 13.6 m (44 ft 7 in)
- Draught: 3.8 m (12 ft 6 in)
- Propulsion: CODAD, 4 × MTU 12V-1163-TB93 rated at 4,440 kW (5,950 hp) each; 2 × shaft with Wärtsilä 5C11 controllable pitch propeller
- Speed: 24 knots (44 km/h; 28 mph) max
- Range: 3,500 nmi (6,500 km; 4,000 mi) at 18 knots (33 km/h; 21 mph)
- Complement: 60 + 32
- Sensors & processing systems: Thales SMART-S Mk-2 multifunction radar; Thales Mirador EOTS; Thales Vigile 100 ESM; Thales Scout Mk2 LPI; Thales Sting 1.2; Thales TACTICOS CMS
- Armament: 1 × Oto Melara 76 mm ('A' position); 1 × Oerlikon Millennium 35 mm Naval Revolver Gun System; 4 × 12.7 mm machine guns; 16-cell VLS(Saudi Arabia variant); 16 x VL Mica; 8 × RGM-84 Harpoon block II anti-ship missiles; 2 × triple torpedo tubes
- Aviation facilities: Flight deck, hangar

Al Diriyah (830) is an Al Jubail-class corvette of the Royal Saudi Navy.

== Development and design ==
In July 2018, it was announced that Spanish Navantia had signed an agreement with the Royal Saudi Navy for the production of five Avante 2200 corvettes with the last to be delivered by 2022 at a cost of approximately 2 billion euros.

== Construction and career ==
Al Diriyah was laid down in 2019 and launched on 14 November 2020 at the Navantia shipyard in San Fernando.

It was involved in 2023 in evacuations from Sudan.
