= Saudi corvette Al Jubail =

Al Jubail class corvette

History

Saudi Arabia
- Name: Al Jubail; (الجبيل)
- Namesake: Al Jubail
- Builder: Navantia, San Fernando
- Laid down: 15 January 2019
- Launched: 22 July 2020
- Acquired: 31 March 2022
- Identification: Pennant number: 828
- Status: In active service

General characteristics
- Class & type: Avante 2200 corvette
- Displacement: 2,419 tons
- Length: 99 m (324 ft 10 in)
- Beam: 13.6 m (44 ft 7 in)
- Draught: 3.8 m (12 ft 6 in)
- Propulsion: CODAD, 4 × MTU 12V-1163-TB93 rated at 4,440 kW (5,950 hp) each; 2 × shaft with Wärtsilä 5C11 controllable pitch propeller
- Speed: Maximum: 24 knots (44 km/h; 28 mph); Cruising: 22 knots; Economy: 18 knots
- Range: 3,500 nmi (6,500 km; 4,000 mi) at 18 knots (33 km/h; 21 mph)
- Complement: 60 + 32
- Armament: 1 × Oto Melara 76 mm ('A' position); 1 × Oerlikon Millennium 35 mm Naval Revolver Gun System; 4 × 12.7 mm machine guns; 16-cell VLS(Saudi Arabia variant); 16 x VL Mica; 8 × RGM-84 Harpoon block II anti-ship missiles; 2 × 3 torpedo tubes
- Aviation facilities: Flight deck, hangar

Al Jubail (828) is an Al Jubail-class corvette of the Royal Saudi Navy.

== Development and design ==
In July 2018 it was announced that Navantia had signed an agreement with the Royal Saudi Navy for the production of five Avante 2200 corvettes with the last to be delivered by 2022 at a cost of approximately 2 billion Euros.

== Construction and career ==
Al Jubail was laid down on 15 January 2019 and launched on 22 July 2020 at the Navantia yard in San Fernando.

Al Jubail was delivered to Saudi Arabia on 25 August 2022.
