= Badr-class corvette =

Class of American-built corvettes of the Saudi Navy

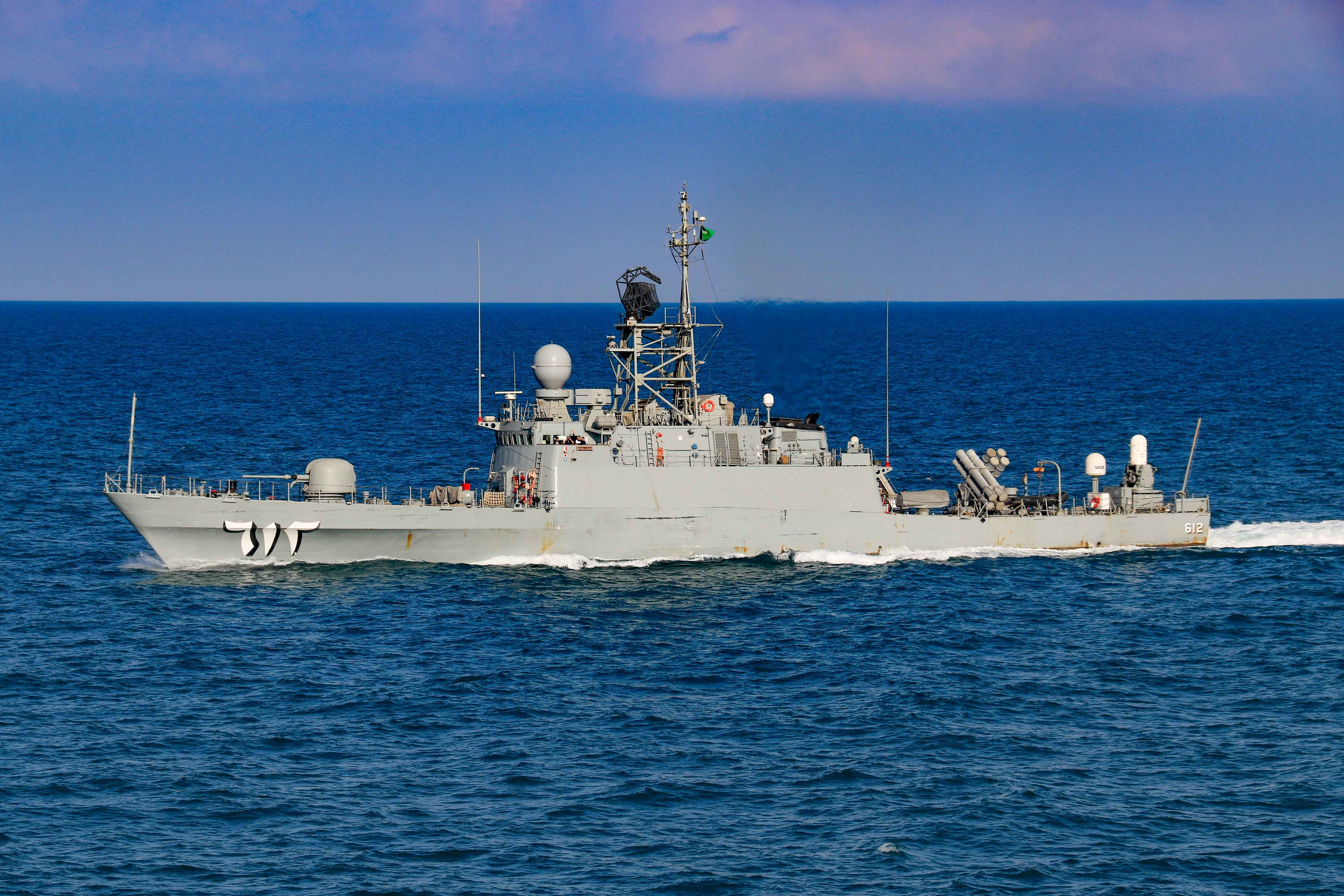
- Saudi Arabian missile corvette Badr (612) during integration exercise in the Persian Gulf

Class overview
- Name: Badr class
- Builders: Tacoma Boatbuilding Company, Tacoma, Washington, United States
- Operators: Royal Saudi Navy
- In commission: 1981–present
- Building: 4
- Completed: 4
- Active: 4

General characteristics
- Type: Corvette
- Displacement: 1,038 tons
- Length: 245 ft (75 m)
- Beam: 31 ft 6 in (9.60 m)
- Draught: 8 ft 9 in (2.67 m)
- Installed power: 1 GE LM-2500 gas turbine
- Propulsion: 2 MTU 12V652 TB91 diesels
- Speed: 30 knots (56 km/h; 35 mph)
- Range: 4,000 nmi (7,400 km; 4,600 mi) at 20 kn (37 km/h; 23 mph)
- Complement: 75
- Sensors & processing systems: Radars; Lockheed SPS-40B (Air search); ISC Cardion SPS-55 (surface search); Sperry Mk 92 (fire control); Sonar; Hull-mounted Raytheon SQS-56 (DE1164)
- Electronic warfare & decoys: SQ-32(V)1 ESM
- Armament: Eight McDonnell Douglas Harpoon launchers, 2 × 4; One FMC/OTO Melara 3-inch (76 mm)/62 Mk 75 Mod 0 gun; One GE/GD 20 mm 6-barrel Vulcan Phalanx; Two Oerlikon 20 mm/80 cannon; One 81 mm mortar; One 40 mm Mk 19 grenade launcher; Six 324 mm US Mk 32 torpedo tubes (2 × 3); Honeywell Mk 46; Decoys: Two Loral Hycor SRBOC 6-barrel Mk 36 fixed launchers

The Badr class is a class of corvette built by the United States and operated by the Saudi Navy. The class has been relegated to a coastal defence role following the modernisation of the Saudi fleet. There are four vessels in service; Badr, Al Yarmook, Hitteen and Tabuk.

== Design ==
In January 1972, Saudi Arabia signed an agreement with the United States to set up a 10-year programme to greatly enlarge the Saudi Navy, previously a small coastal patrol force. The programme envisaged the construction in the United States of a series of corvettes as well as other warships such as minesweepers and amphibious warfare ships. As part of this programme, on 30 August 1977, an order was placed with the Tacoma Boatbuilding Company of Tacoma, Washington for 4 missile-armed corvettes, with delivery expected between 1980 and 1981.

The four ships, at first known by the US-Navy style designation of "PCG", and later as the Badr-class, are 74.68 metres (245 ft 0 in) long overall, with a beam of 9.60 metres (31 ft 6 in) and a draught of 2.59 metres (8 ft 6 in). Displacement was intended as 720 long tons (730 t), but the ships were completed significantly overweight, and were recorded as displacing 903 long tons (917 t) standard and 1,038 long tons (1,055 t) full load in 1995. They are powered by one General Electric LM2500 gas turbine rated at 23,000 shaft horsepower (17,000 kW) and two MTU 12V625 TB91 diesel engines (rated at a total of 3,058 brake horsepower (2,280 kW)) in a Combined Diesel and Gas (CODAG) arrangement, driving two controllable pitch propellers. This gives a maximum speed of 30 knots (35 mph; 56 km/h) when using the gas turbine and 21 knots (24 mph; 39 km/h) on diesel. The ships have a range of 4,000 nautical miles (4,600 mi; 7,400 km) at 20 knots (23 mph; 37 km/h).

Principal anti-ship armament consists of eight Harpoon anti-ship missiles, with a gun armament of a single OTO Melara 76 mm gun forward, one Vulcan Phalanx close-in weapon system (CIWS) aft, two Oerlikon 20 mm cannon, an 81 mm mortar, and two 40 mm Mk 19 grenade launchers. Anti-submarine armament consisted of two triple Mark 32 Surface Vessel Torpedo Tubes for Mark 46 torpedoes. SPS-40B air search radar and SPS-55 navigation/surface search radars are carried, while a Mark 92 fire control radar is fitted above the ship's bridges. SQS-56 hull-mounted sonar is carried to direct the ships' torpedo tubes.

== Ships ==
| Name | Pennant | Laid down | Launched | Commissioned | Notes |
|---|---|---|---|---|---|
| Badr | 612 | 30 May 1979 | 26 January 1980 | 28 September 1981 | Originally PCG 1 |
| Al Yarmook | 614 | 13 December 1979 | 13 May 1980 | 10 May 1982 | Originally PCG 2 |
| Hitteen | 616 | 19 May 1980 | 5 September 1980 | 12 October 1982 | Originally PCG 3 |
| Tabuk | 618 | 22 September 1980 | 18 June 1981 | 10 January 1983 | Originally PCG 4 |

== Bibliography ==
- Baker, A. D., ed. (1998). The Naval Institute Guide to Combat Fleets of the World 1998–1999. Annapolis, Maryland, USA: Naval Institute Press. ISBN 1-55750-111-4.
- Gardiner, Robert; Chumbley, Stephen, eds. (1995). Conway's All The World's Fighting Ships 1947–1995. Annapolis, Maryland, USA: Naval Institute Press. ISBN 1-55750-132-7.
- Moore, John, ed. (1979). Jane's Fighting Ships 1979–80. London: Jane's Yearbooks. ISBN 0-354-00587-1.
- Watts, Anthony J. (2006). Jane's Warship Recognition Guide. HarperCollins Publishers. p. 258. ISBN 0-00-718327-5.
