= Avante 2200 =

Spanish corvette class

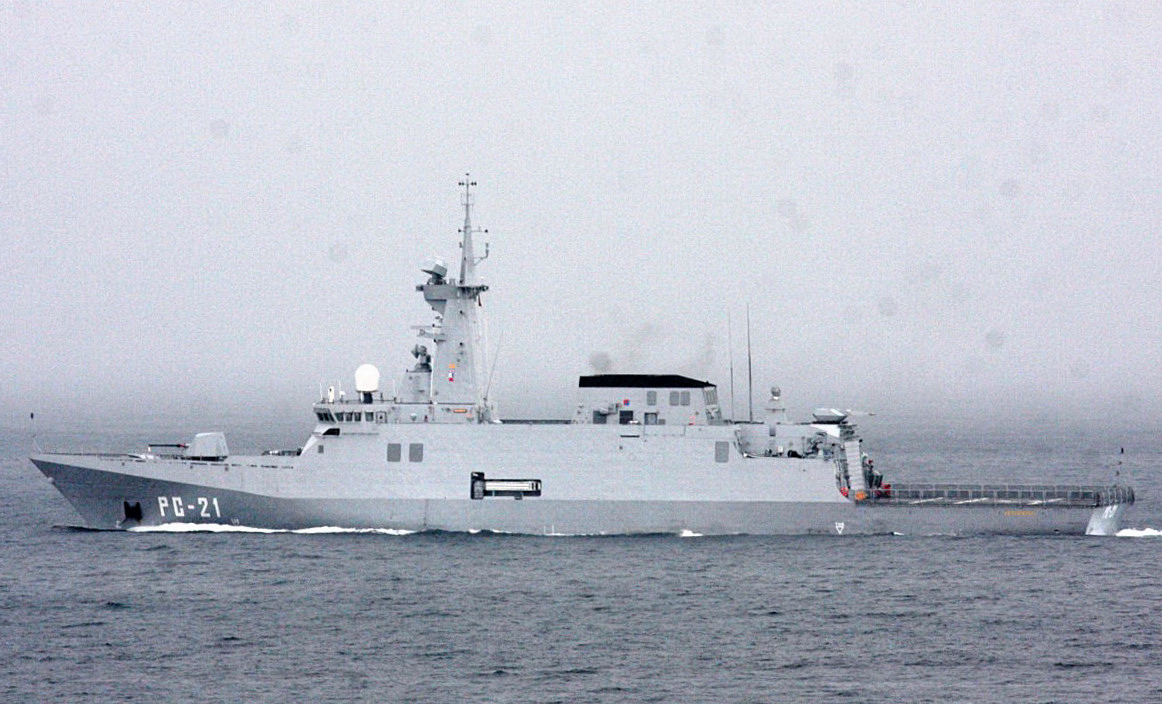
- Guaiquerí

Class overview
- Builders: Navantia, Cádiz, Puerto Real Yard
- Operators: Bolivarian Navy of Venezuela; Royal Saudi Navy
- Built: 2009–present
- In commission: 2011–present
- Planned: 4 (Venezuela); 8 (Saudi Arabia)
- Completed: 4 (Venezuela); 5 (Saudi Arabia)
- Active: 3 (Venezuela); 5 (Saudi Arabia)
- Lost: 1 (Venezuela)

General characteristics
- Type: Corvette
- Displacement: 2,419 tons
- Length: 99 m (324 ft 10 in)
- Beam: 13.6 m (44 ft 7 in)
- Draught: 3.8 m (12 ft 6 in)
- Propulsion: CODAD, 4 × MTU 12V-1163-TB93 rated at 4,440 kW (5,950 hp) each; 2 × shaft with Wärtsilä 5C11 controllable pitch propeller
- Speed: 24 knots (44 km/h; 28 mph) maximum
- Range: 3,500 nmi (6,500 km; 4,000 mi) at 18 knots (33 km/h; 21 mph)
- Complement: 60 + 32
- Sensors & processing systems: Thales SMART-S Mk-2 multifunction radar; Leonardo Kronos NV 3D multifunctional radar (Al Jubail class); Thales Mirador EOTS; Thales Vigile 100 ESM; Thales Scout Mk2 LPI; Thales Sting 1.2; Thales TACTICOS CMS
- Armament: 1 × Oto Melara 76 mm ('A' position); 1 × Oerlikon Millennium 35 mm Naval Revolver Gun System; 4 × 12.7 mm machine guns; 16-cell VLS(Saudi Arabia variant); 16 x VL Mica; 8 × RGM-84 Harpoon block II anti-ship missiles (Saudi Arabia variant); 2 × 3 torpedo tubes (Saudi Arabia variant)
- Aviation facilities: Flight deck, hangar

The Avante 2200 is a corvette design by the Navantia shipyard of Spain. Navantia has developed an Avante family of ships with different sizes, and adapted to different missions. They share the same design standard.

Navantia integrated multiple systems, including its Catiz combat management system, Hermesys integrated communications system, Dorna fire-control system and Minerva integrated bridge system.

== Variants ==
=== Guaiquerí-class patrol boat ===
Four Avante 2200 corvettes were built by Navantia to the Guaiquerí-class design for the Venezuelan Navy. The first ship was commissioned in April 2011 and the last in January 2012.

| Name | Pennant | Builder | Laid down | Launched | Commissioned | Fate |
|---|---|---|---|---|---|---|
| Guaiquerí | PC-21 | Navantia, Spain | 11 September 2008 | 24 June 2009 | 14 April 2011 | |
| Warao | PC-22 | Navantia, Spain | 12 May 2009 | 3 November 2009 | August 2011 | out of service after grounding incident in 2012. |
| Yekuana | PC-23 | Navantia, Spain | 22 September 2009 | 1 March 2010 | 9 December 2011 | |
| Kariña | PC-24 | Navantia, Spain | 17 February 2010 | 13 July 2010 | January 2012 | |

=== Al Jubail-class corvette ===
In July 2018, Navantia signed an agreement with the Royal Saudi Navy for the production of five Avante 2200 corvettes, called Al Jubail-class corvette. The last was to be delivered by 2022 at a cost of approximately 2 billion Euros.

Navantia signed a joint-venture agreement with state-owned Saudia Arabian Military Industries (SAMI) to build five corvettes based on the Avante 2200 for the Royal Saudi Naval Forces (RSNF). Under the agreement, the last vessel must be delivered in 2024, including construction, life cycle support for five years, with an option for another five years. The RSNF variant is called the Avante 2200.

The Saudi Arabian variant is a 2,000-ton class vessel capable of performing anti-submarine warfare (ASW), anti-surface warfare (ASuW) and anti-air warfare (AAW). The Al Jubail-class corvette has a maximum range of 4,500 nautical miles, achieving 25 knots, powered by four diesel engines in a CODAD arrangement.

The Al Jubail class is fitted with a Leonardo SUPER RAPID 76 mm main gun, a Rheinmetall Air Defence MILLENNIUM 35mm close-in weapon system, four 12.7 mm machine guns, two triple torpedo tubes, two by quad anti-ship missiles and 64 ESSM surface-to-air missiles (16-cell Mk 41).

Ships in class
| Name | Hull number | Builder | Laid down | Launched | Commissioned |
|---|---|---|---|---|---|
| Al Jubail | 828 | Navantia, Spain | 15 January 2019 | 22 July 2020 | |
| Al Diriyah | 830 | Navantia, Spain | 2019 | 14 November 2020 | |
| Hail | 832 | Navantia, Spain | 6 August 2020 | 28 March 2021 | |
| Jazan | 834 | Navantia, Spain | 1 December 2020 | 24 July 2021 | |
| Unayzah | 836 | Navantia, Spain | | 4 December 2021 | |

==== Second batch ====
On December 11, 2024, Saudi Arabia ordered a second batch of three Avante 2200 ships. Construction of the first unit was to begin 2024 and the last vessel was scheduled for delivery in 2028.

On October 25, 2026, Navantia launched the seventh ship (second of batch 2) HMS Neom (840).
