= Eastern Fleet (Saudi Arabia) =

The Eastern Gulf Fleet Command (Arabic: الأُسْطُول الشَرقيّ), or officially Eastern Fleet (EF), is one of the two main fleets of Saudi Arabian Navy. It is headquartered at Royal Naval Base at Jubail, on the east coast of the Arabian Kingdom, responsible for military operations of the Saudi Navy in the Gulf waters.

Rear Admiral Fahd Al-Shamrani is reported as the fleet commander ("fleet operations manager"). The Royal Saudi Navy was founded in 1957.

== See also ==
- Western Fleet (Saudi Arabia)
