= Royal Saudi Naval Forces =

Navy of the Kingdom of Saudi Arabia

Royal Saudi Navy
- البحرية السعودية
- Emblem of the Royal Saudi Naval Forces
- Founded: 1789 (historical); 1960 (official)
- Country: Saudi Arabia
- Type: Navy
- Role: Naval warfare
- Size: 18,000 approx. (inc. 4,500 marines)
- Part of: Saudi Armed Forces: GSP (as of 1960)
- Parent agency: Ministry Of Defense
- Colors: Blue white
- Equipment: 7 Frigates (4 under construction); 9 Corvettes (3 under construction); 9 Fast Attack Crafts; 39 Patrol Vessels; 3 Minehunters; 2 Support ships 2 royal yachts
- Engagements: Gulf War; Yemeni Civil War; Houthi–Saudi Arabian conflict; Saudi-led intervention in the Yemeni civil war; 2025–2026 Southern Yemen campaign; 2026 Iran war; Saudi Arabia in the 2026 Iran war
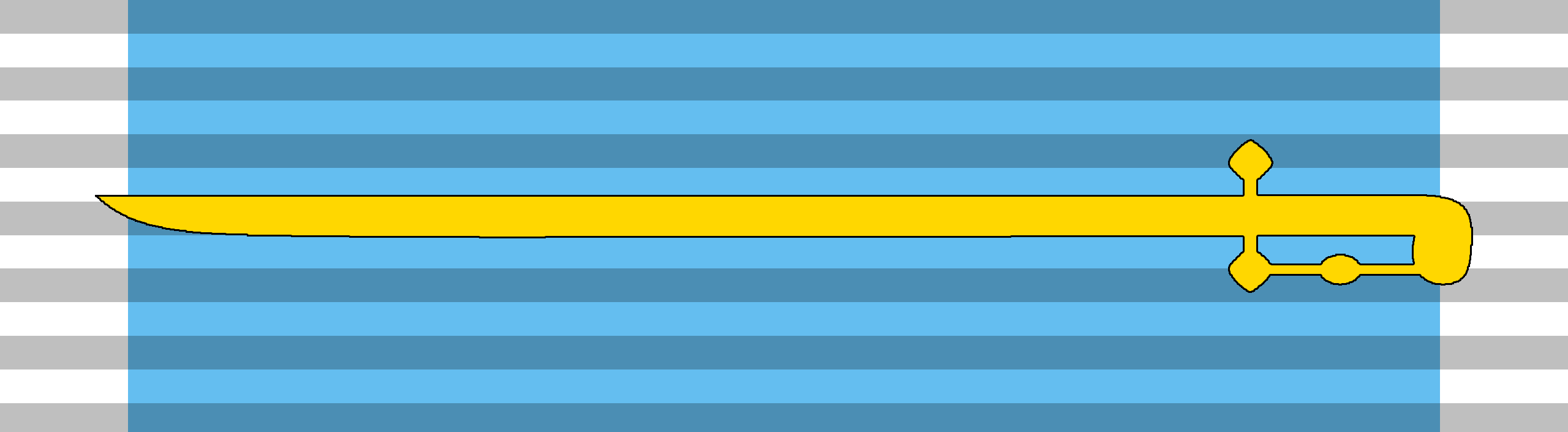
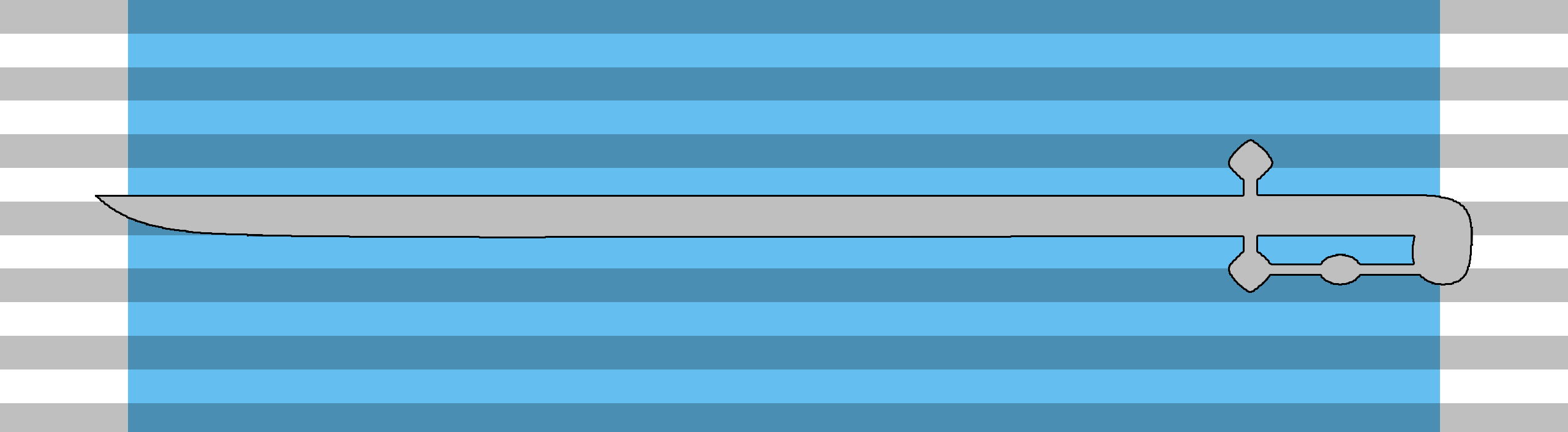
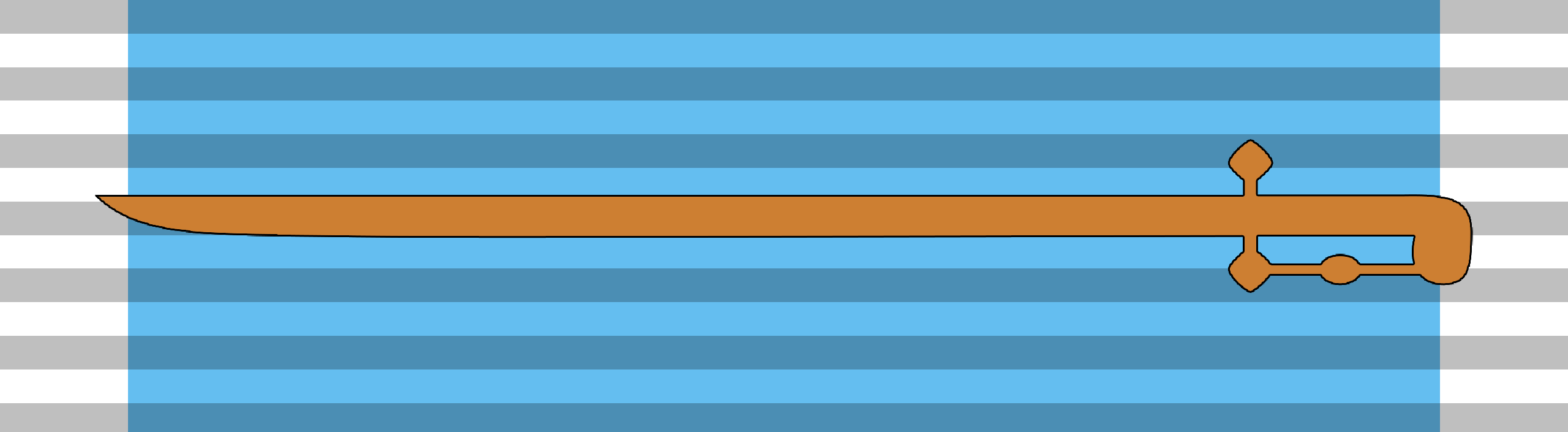
- Decorations: Naval Forces Medal - 1st Class Naval Forces Medal - 2nd Class Naval Forces Medal - 3rd Class
- Website: rsnf.gov.sa

Commanders
- Current commander: V. Admiral Mohammed Al-Gharibi
- Notable commanders: Abu al-A'war; Rahmah ibn Jabir al-Jalhami

Insignia
- Seal

- Ensign

- Jack

- Flag

- Pennant

Aircraft flown
- Helicopter: AS332 Super Puma
- Utility helicopter: AS565 SA Dauphin; Sikorsky MH-60R

The Royal Saudi Naval Forces (RSNF), (Note: Arabic: القُوَّات البَحْريَّة الْمَلكيَّة السُّعُودِيَّة, romanized: Al-Quwwat al-Bahriyah al-Malakiyah as-Su'udiyah) or Royal Saudi Navy, (Note: Arabic: البَحْريَّة الْمَلكيَّة السُّعُودِيَّة, romanized: Al-Quwwat al-Bahriyah al-Arabiyah as-Su'udiyah) is the maritime arm of the Saudi Arabian Armed Forces and one of the five service branches of the Ministry of Defense of Saudi Arabia. Its primary role is monitoring and defending Saudi territorial waters, ensuring regional freedom of navigation, and protecting commercial sea routes through multinational naval coalitions.

The Royal Saudi Navy is organized into two fleets: The Eastern Fleet, which operates in the Persian Gulf from the King Abdulaziz Naval Base at Jubail, and the Western Fleet, which operates in the Red Sea from the King Faisal Naval Base at Jeddah. Each fleet has full military capability, including warships, support ships, administrative and technical support, naval aviation, marines and special security units.

Since the turn of the 21st century, the RSNF has undergone extensive efforts to expand and modernize its fleet, enhance its operational capabilities, and professionalize its personnel.

== History ==
The navy was founded in 1960 and began a significant expansion with United States assistance in 1972, with the aim to match the Imperial Iranian Navy. Following the Iranian Revolution a further expansion programme, Sawari, was initiated with French assistance. Further vessels were purchased from Britain and France in the 1980s and 1990s. In 1980, U.S. defense contractor Science Applications International Corporation began work with the Royal Saudi Navy to design and integrate the country's own command, control, and communications (C3) centers.

== Fleet Inventory ==
=== Frigates ===
Class	Picture	Type	Quantity	Origin	Ship	Displacement	Note
Active (7)
Al Riyadh class	Saudi frigate Al Riyadh	Multirole Guided Missile & Air Defence Frigate	3	France	HMS Al Riyadh (812) HMS Makkah (814) HMS Dammam (816)	4,725 tons	Heavily modified variant of the French La Fayette-class, optimized for advanced anti-air capabilities with Aster 15 missiles.
Al Madinah class		Multirole Frigate	4	France	HMS Al Madinah (702) HMS Hofouf (704) HMS Abha (706) HMS Taif (708)	2,610 tons	Commissioned under the Sawari I program in the mid-1980s. Armed with Otomat anti-ship missiles and Crotale surface-to-air systems.
Under Construction / Delivering (4)
Multi-Mission Surface Combatant (MMSC)		Multirole Guided-Missile Frigate	4	United States	HMS King Saud (820) HMS King Fahd (822) HMS King Abdullah (824) HMS King Salman (826)	3,600 tons	Procured under the Tuwaiq Project. Derived from the Freedom-class littoral combat ship hull; equipped with Harpoon Block II and Sea Ceptor systems.

=== Corvettes ===
Class	Picture	Type	Quantity	Origin	Ship	Displacement	Note
Active (9)
Al Jubail class		Multirole Guided-Missile Corvette	5	Spain	HMS Al Jubail (828) HMS Al Diriyah (830) HMS Hail (832) HMS Jazan (834) HMS Unayzah (836)	2,500 tons	Built by Navantia based on the Avante 2000 platform. Outfitted with ESSM surface-to-air missiles and Harpoon Block II anti-ship systems.
Badr class		Corvette	4	United States	HMS Badr (612) HMS Al Yarmook (614) HMS Hitteen (616) HMS Tabuk (618)	1,038 tons	American-built hulls commissioned between 1981 and 1983. Primarily stationed with the Eastern Fleet in the Persian Gulf.

=== Patrol Vessels & Fast Attack ===
Class	Picture	Type	Quantity	Origin	Ship	Displacement	Note
Active (48)
Al Siddiq class		Fast Attack Craft (Missile)	9	United States	HMS Al Siddiq (511) HMS Al Farouq (513) HMS Abdul Aziz (515) HMS Faisal (517) HMS Khalid (519) HMS Amr (521) HMS Tariq (523) HMS Ouqbah (525) HMS Abu Obaidah (527)	495 tons	Heavily armed fast attack platforms designed for rapid anti-surface warfare strikes using Harpoon missiles.
HSI32-class		High-Speed Interceptor	39	France; Saudi Arabia	Numbered patrol hulls	132 tons	Procured from CMN; 18 hulls were constructed locally by Zamil Shipyard in Dammam to satisfy domestic manufacturing goals.

=== Mine Warfare & Auxiliary ===
Class	Picture	Type	Quantity	Origin	Ship	Displacement	Note
Active (5)
Al Jawf class		Mine Countermeasures (MCM) Vessel	3	United Kingdom	HMS Al Jawf (420) HMS Al Shaqra (422) HMS Al Kharj (424)	480 tons	British-built Sandown-class minehunters utilizing glass-reinforced plastic hulls to reduce magnetic signatures.
Boraida class		Replenishment Oiler (AOR)	2	France	HMS Boraida (902) HMS Yunbou (904)	10,500 tons	Modified French Durance-class design. Operates as the fleet's primary logistical support mechanism for mid-ocean resupply operations.

== Naval aviation ==
Aircraft	Origin	Type	Variant	In service	Notes
Sikorsky SH-60 Seahawk	USA	ASW/ASuW Helicopter	MH-60R	10	Armed with Hellfire missiles
Eurocopter AS332 Super Puma	FRA	ASW helicopter	B1, M1, F1S1, F1S2	20	
AS565 SA Dauphin	FRA	SAR helicopter	AS565 SA	26	

== Marines ==
The Royal Saudi Navy maintains two, 1,500-man marine brigades consisting of three battalions each. The brigades are assigned to the Western Fleet headquartered in Jeddah and the Eastern Fleet headquartered in Jubail. The brigades are equipped with 500 Pegaso BMR AFVs and HMMWVs.

== Future ==
In 2016, Germany was slated to supply 48 patrol boats to Saudi Arabia within the framework of its border security project, a cost of 1.5 billion euros was noted for this deal. Lürssen had started building 15 patrol vessels for the project's first phase by 2016. The patrol boats to be procured under the current contract come in two forms. The first were to be the 'TNC 35' models, which are 35-meter-long and are propelled by two diesel engines with a combined output of 7,800 kilowatts. The boat can reach speeds of up to 40 knots. The second models, 'FPB 38' are 38-meter-long and can reach speeds of up to 31 knots. As of November 2016 1 TNC 35 has been delivered to Saudi Arabia.

Saudi Arabia had wanted in 2013 to purchase five German submarines for around €2.5 billion ($3.4 billion) and more than two dozen more in the future.

In December 2014, the U.S. awarded Lockheed Martin a contract for a Foreign Military Sale of the Mk 41 Vertical Launching System to Saudi Arabia. With no surface ships compatible with the Mk 41 and no plans to acquire a land-based missile defense system, this indicated the country was close to purchasing a VLS-equipped surface combatant. Saudi Arabia has evaluated the Arleigh Burke-class destroyer and the Multi-mission Combat Ship version of the Freedom-class littoral combat ship able to carry a VLS. In October 2015, the US Congress was informed of a possible sale of Multi-Mission Surface Combatant (MMSC) Ships, a variant of the LCS.

In July 2018 it was announced that Navantia had signed an agreement with the Royal Saudi Navy for the production of 5 Avante 2000 Corvettes with the last to be delivered by 2022 at a cost of approximately 2 billion Euros.

Saudi Arabia ordered three more Avante 2200 corvettes from Navantia in 2024.

== Bases ==
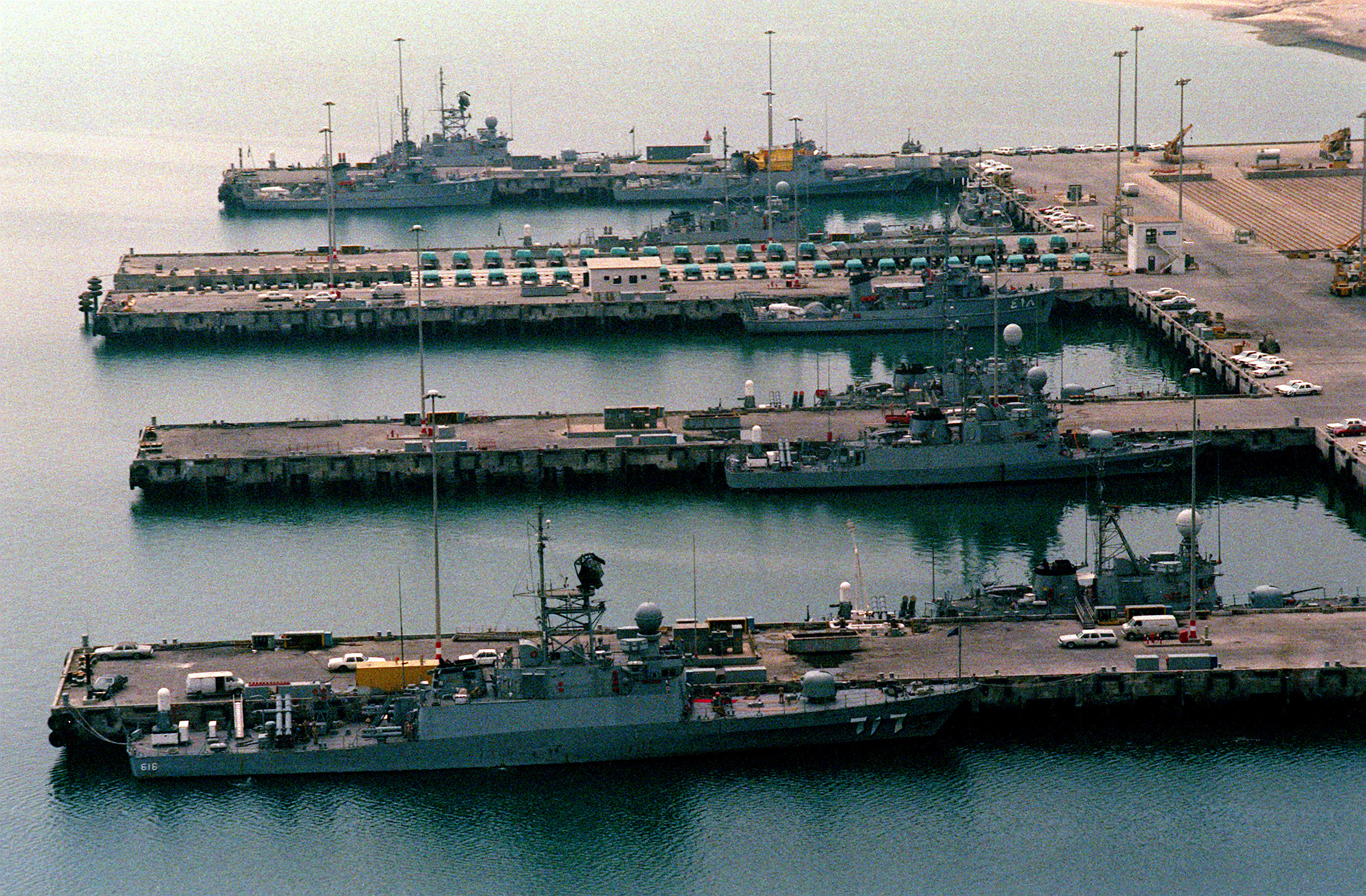
King Abdulaziz Naval Base in Jubail, home to the eastern fleet of the Royal Saudi Navy

- Jeddah (King Faisal Naval Base) – Red Sea base home to the navy's Western fleet for frigates and 2 missile boats, 1 replenishing ship and 1 patrol minesweeper with an air station located north of the base; located south of the Jeddah Islamic Port container area
- Jubail (King Abdulaziz Naval Base) – Persian Gulf base is home to the navy's Eastern fleet; smaller base home to corvettes, replenishing ship remaining missile boats and minesweepers
- Dammam (Ras Al-Ghar military port) – Persian Gulf home port for the Saudi Royal family's two Royal Yachts

== Ranks ==
Officer ranks

Rank group	General / flag officers				Senior officers			Junior officers
Royal Saudi Navy
Royal Saudi Navy	فريق أول; Fariq 'awal	فريق; Fariq	لواء; Liwa	عميد; Amid	عقيد; Aqid	مقدم; Muqaddam	رائد; Ra'id	نقيب; Naqib	ملازم أول; Mulazim awwal	ملازم; Mulazim

Other ranks

The rank insignia of non-commissioned officers and enlisted personnel.

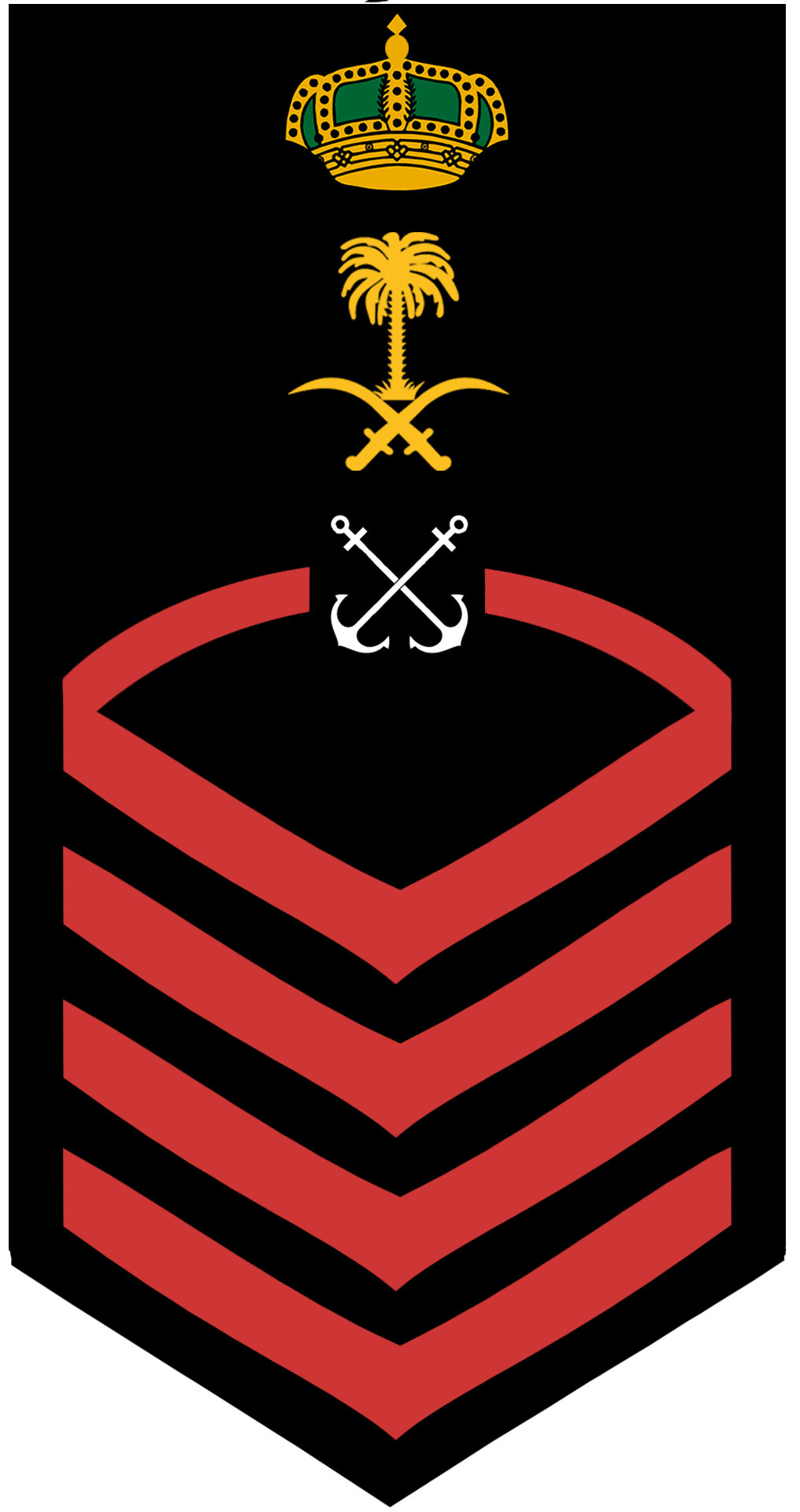
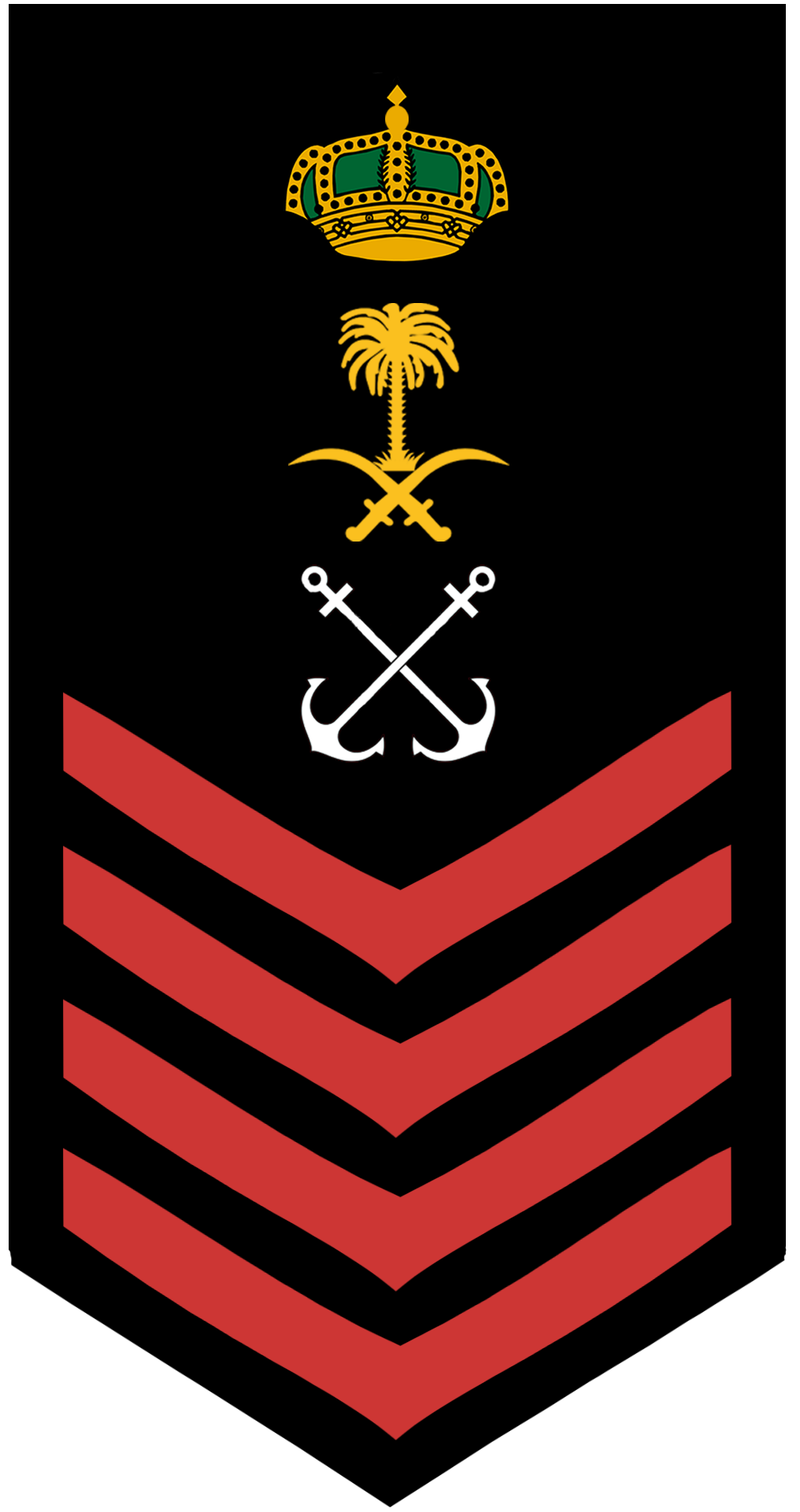
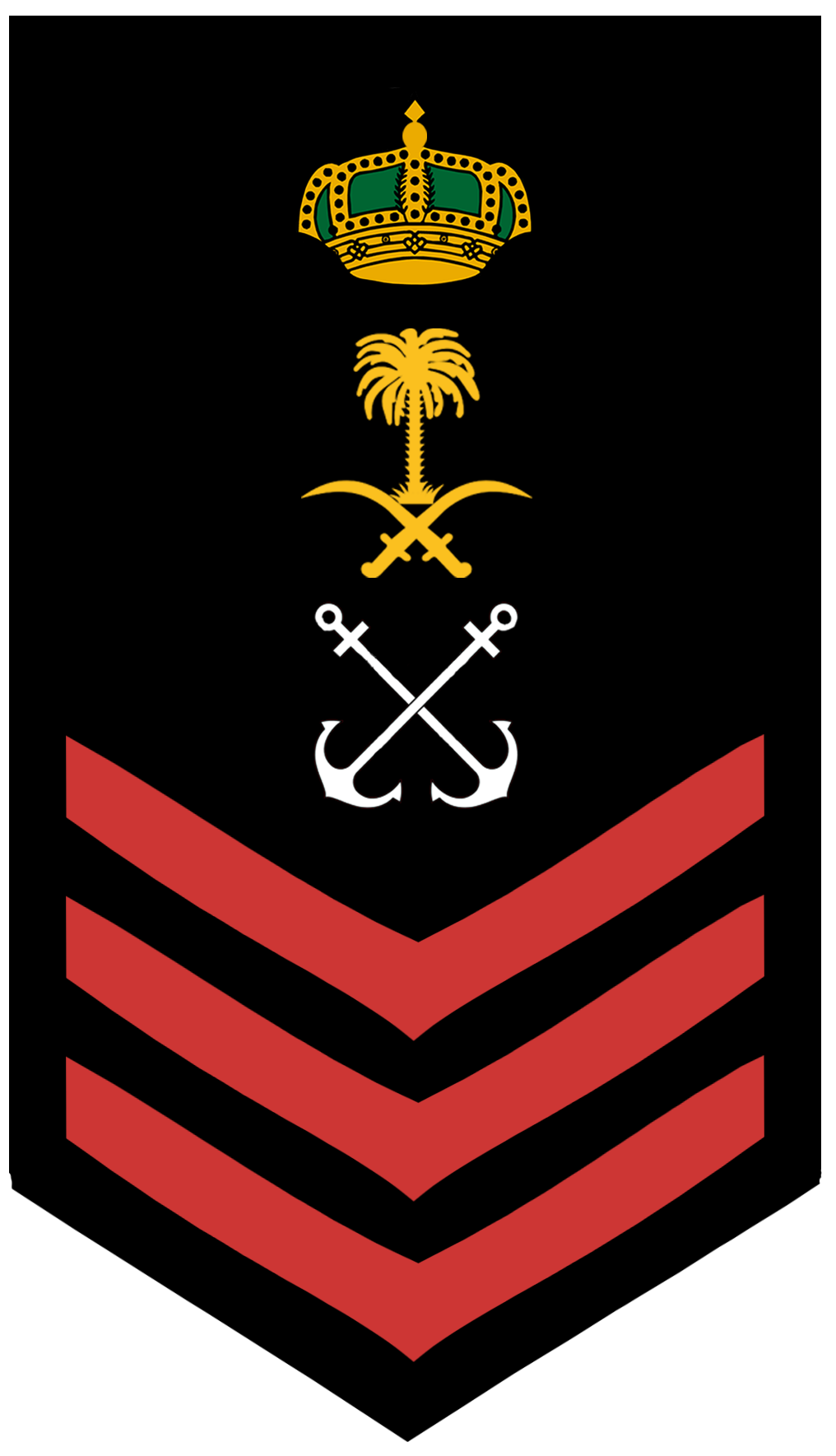
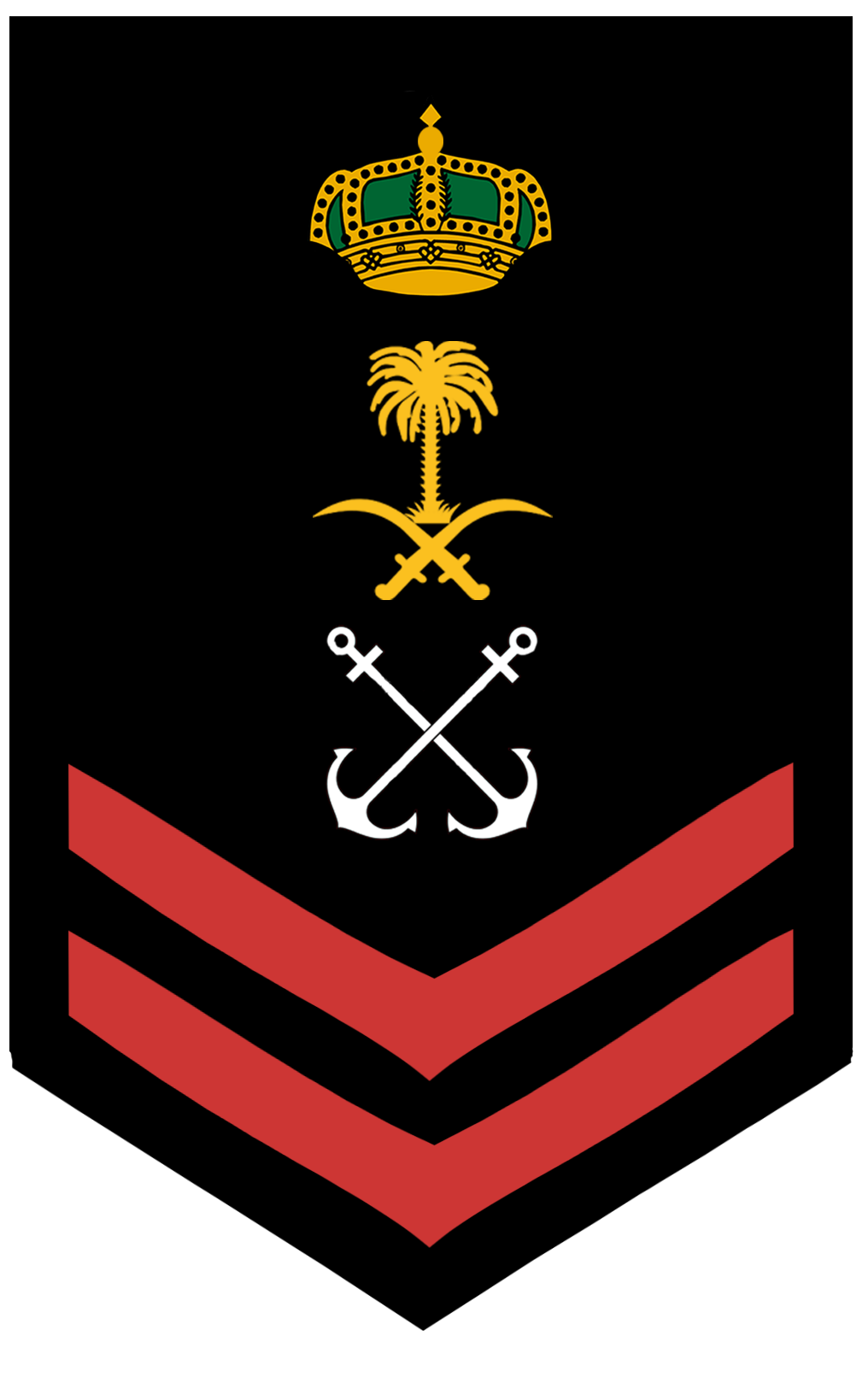
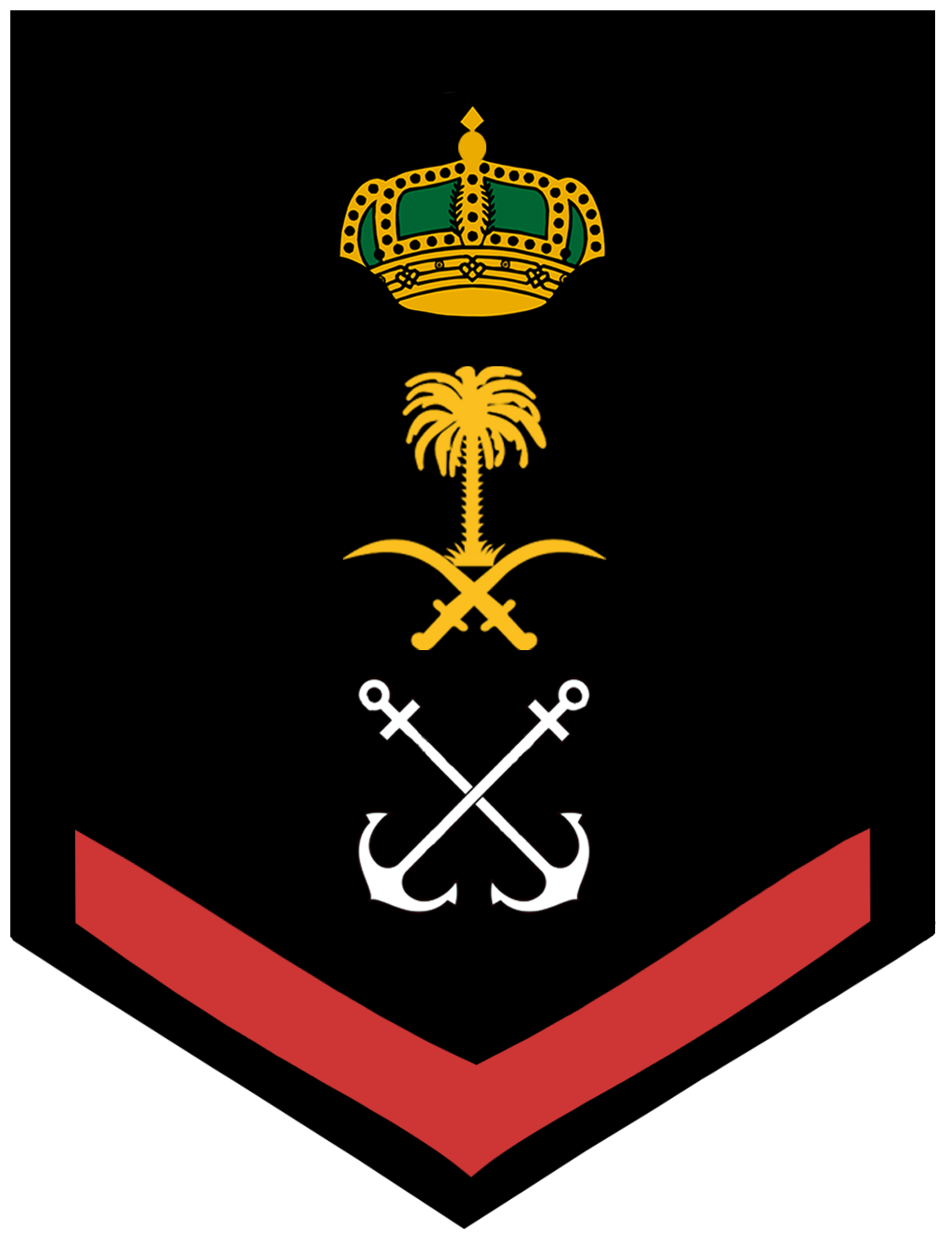
Rank group	Senior NCOs			Junior NCOs	Enlisted
Royal Saudi Navy						No insignia
Royal Saudi Navy	رقيب أول; Raqib 'awal	رقيب; Raqib	وكيل رقيب; Wakil raqib	عريف; Earif	جندي أول; Jundiun awwal	جندي; Jundiun

== Incidents ==
On 30 January 2017 Al-Madinah was attacked by Houthi rebels using a suicide boat, killing 2 sailors and wounding 3 others. The attack took place near the port city of Al Hudaydah, 150 kilometers southwest of the Yemeni capital Sana'a.

== See also ==
- Coast guard

=== Sources ===
- Conway's All the World's Fighting Ships 1947–1995
