= Western Fleet (Saudi Arabia) =

The Red Sea Fleet Command or officially Western Fleet (WF), also called " West Coast Fleet ", is one of the two main formations of the Saudi Arabian Navy, with its headquarters at Royal Naval Base at Jeddah, Western Province, that is the HQ and home port of the west sea fleet command of the Kingdom of Saudi Arabia.

== See also ==
- Eastern Fleet (Saudi Arabia)
