= King Faisal Naval Base =

Saudi Arabian naval base in Jeddah

King Faisal Naval Base
- قاعدة الملك فيصل البحرية
- Jeddah in Saudi Arabia

Site information
- Owner: Royal Saudi Navy
- Controlled by: Western Fleet

Location
- Shown within Saudi Arabia
- Coordinates: 21°20′33″N 039°10′36″E

Airfield information
- Identifiers: ICAO: OEJF
- Elevation: 7 feet (2 m) AMSL
Runways
Direction	Length and surface
15/33	8,999 feet (2,743 m) Asphalt
- Sources: DoD FLIP

King Faisal Naval Base (ICAO: OEJF; Arabic: قاعدة الملك فيصل البحرية) is a Royal Saudi Navy base located in Jeddah, Saudi Arabia. It is home to the navy's Western Fleet which operates in the Red Sea, one of the two main formations of the Saudi navy.

The base was used by the United States Air Force after the Iraqi invasion of Kuwait and in the leadup to the subsequent Gulf War of 1991.

== See also ==
- List of things named after Saudi kings
- List of military installations in Saudi Arabia
