= SNTI =

Système Numérisé de Transmissions Intérieures, commonly known as SNTI, refers to an Integrated Shipboard Communication System (ISCS) developed for the French Navy in the 1970s and first deployed in the early 1980s for use in combat ships then nuclear Ballistic missile submarines successors.

For the first time, this system has been offering on board a full resilient communication system mixing digital Voice and Data thanks to its revolutionary loop or ring protection concept. This major concept has also been used by the civilian Telecommunications (original invention patent by Sir Bernard Pando [1] [2]).

== Background ==
The SNTI project started by establishing ISCS requirements in early 1970. By 1972, the first multichannel single loop working model had been developed (SNTI 120 channels) and by 1978, the French began a first generation development of SNTI for use on their Tripartite-class minehunter (TMH) program. A second generation development began in 1979 and a system was functioning in 1980. Most of the French Navy ships have been equipped with this revolutionary communication system (SNTI 240 channels). That version was also used on the USS Carl Vinson Carrier as a test-bed basis for the development of the current optical United States Navy ISCS systems.

Like all SNTI versions, the last version called "SGD" for "Système de Grande Diffusion" was designed in T.R.T. company by Bernard Pando's team early 1987 to equip the French aircraft carrier Charles de Gaulle flagship of the French Navy based on multiloops system (4 loops with 360 channels each, on optical fibers).

The success of this SNTI technology has been residing on its concepts of survivability, security, immunity to Radiation Hazards (RADHAZ), maintenance, monitoring, in the many combat or disaster situations.

== Notes ==
- Jump up ^ Bernard Pando, "Time sharing multiplex telecommunications system - has relief line in ring brought into service in opposite direction" From Patent database EPO - Patent N°FR2256605 priority 26 Dec 1973 by T.R.T. company-
- Jump up ^ In June 1993, Sir Bernard Pando was made "Knight of the French National Order of Merit" for his career and contributions -
- Jump up ^ French Ministry of Defence - Frigate combat equipment page on French Navy website (French)
- Jump up ^ "An Evaluation of the Effectiveness of SNTI, an Integrated Shipboard Communications System, for Use Aboard U. S. Navy Surface Combatants" by G. Bartlett, Farrell, Lieutenant, United States Navy, B. A., College of the Holy Cross - March 1986
