= Mighty Servant =

Mighty Servant can refer to:

- Mighty Servant 1, a heavy-lift ship
- Mighty Servant 2, a heavy-lift ship
- Mighty Servant 3, another heavy-lift ship
- Mighty Servant of Leuk-o, an artifact in the Dungeons & Dragons fantasy campaign setting Greyhawk
