= MV Black Marlin =

Dutch semisubmersible heavy-lift ship

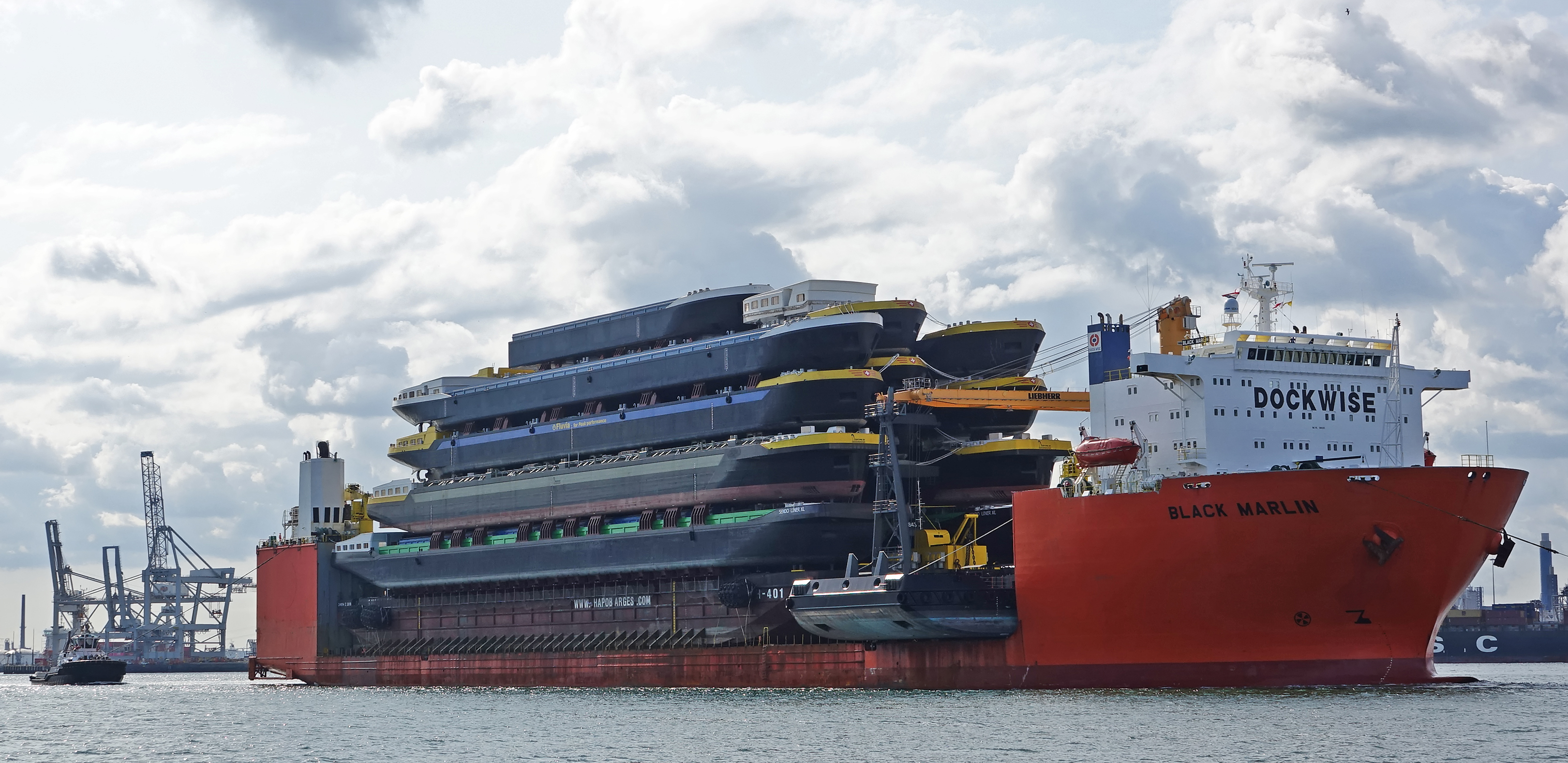

History
- Name: Black Marlin
- Owner: Dockwise Limited
- Operator: Dockwise Limited
- Builder: CSBC Corporation (Kaohsiung, Taiwan)
- Launched: 30 July 1999
- Completed: 15 October 1999
- Identification: IMO number: 9186326; MMSI number: 248312000; Callsign: 9HA4606
- Status: Operational

General characteristics
- Class & type: A1 General Cargo Carrier E0 DK(+) PWDK TMON
- Tonnage: 56,500 DWT
- Length: 217.8 m (715 ft)
- Beam: 42 m (138 ft)
- Draught: 23.3 m (76 ft)
- Depth: 13.3 m (44 ft)
- Installed power: 12,621 kW
- Propulsion: MAN B&W 8S50MC-C
- Speed: 14.5 knots

MV Black Marlin is a semisubmersible heavy-lift ship operated by Dockwise of the Netherlands. Black Marlin and her sister ship Blue Marlin comprise the Marlin class of heavy lift ship. At 42 meters wide, Black Marlin is too wide for the old Panama Canal, but fits the 51 meter width of the new Panama Canal unlike Blue Marlin's 63 meter width.

== History ==
Black Marlin was built at CSBC Corporation, Taiwan’s Kaohsiung shipyard for Offshore Heavy Transport ASA. She was launched in 1999. She was delivered on November, 18, 1999. As of 2019, she was sailing under the flag of Malta.
