= Zhenhua 33 =

Ship

History

PRC
- Commissioned: 2012-2015

General characteristics
- Type: Float-on/float-off
- Displacement: 50,000 long tons (51,000 t)
- Length: 227 m (744 ft 9 in)
- Beam: 43 m (141 ft 1 in)
- Draft: 10 m (32 ft 10 in) and; 27 m (88 ft 7 in) when submerged
- Propulsion: electrical from marine diesel generators
- Speed: 14 kt
- Endurance: 18000 nm
- Electronic warfare & decoys: None
- Armament: Unarmed
- Armour: None
- Aircraft carried: None

Chinese float-on/float-off ship Zhenhua 33 (Revitalize China 33) is a military/civilian dual use semi-submersible ship (AKF) built in the People’s Republic of China (PRC) for the People's Liberation Army Navy (PLAN).

Civilians operate the ship during peacetime for commercial operations, and when activated, the ship will come under PLAN control. The ship is 227 meters long and with a 43 meter beam, displacing 50,000 tons. The draft is 10 meters, but is increased to 27 meters when submerged. The total deck area is 7,700 square meters. Four diesel engine generators produce the electrical power for propulsion, giving the ship a speed of 14 knots and a range of 18,000 nautical miles. Specification:

- Length: 227 m
- Beam: 43 m
- Draft: 10 m, 27 m when submerged
- Displacement: 50000 ton
- Speed: 14 kt
- Endurance: 18000 nm

Name (English)	Name (Han 中文)	Displacement (t)	Commissioned	Status
Revitalize China 33	振华33	50000	March 14, 2017	Active
