= Mighty Servant 3 =

Semisubmersible heavy-lift ship

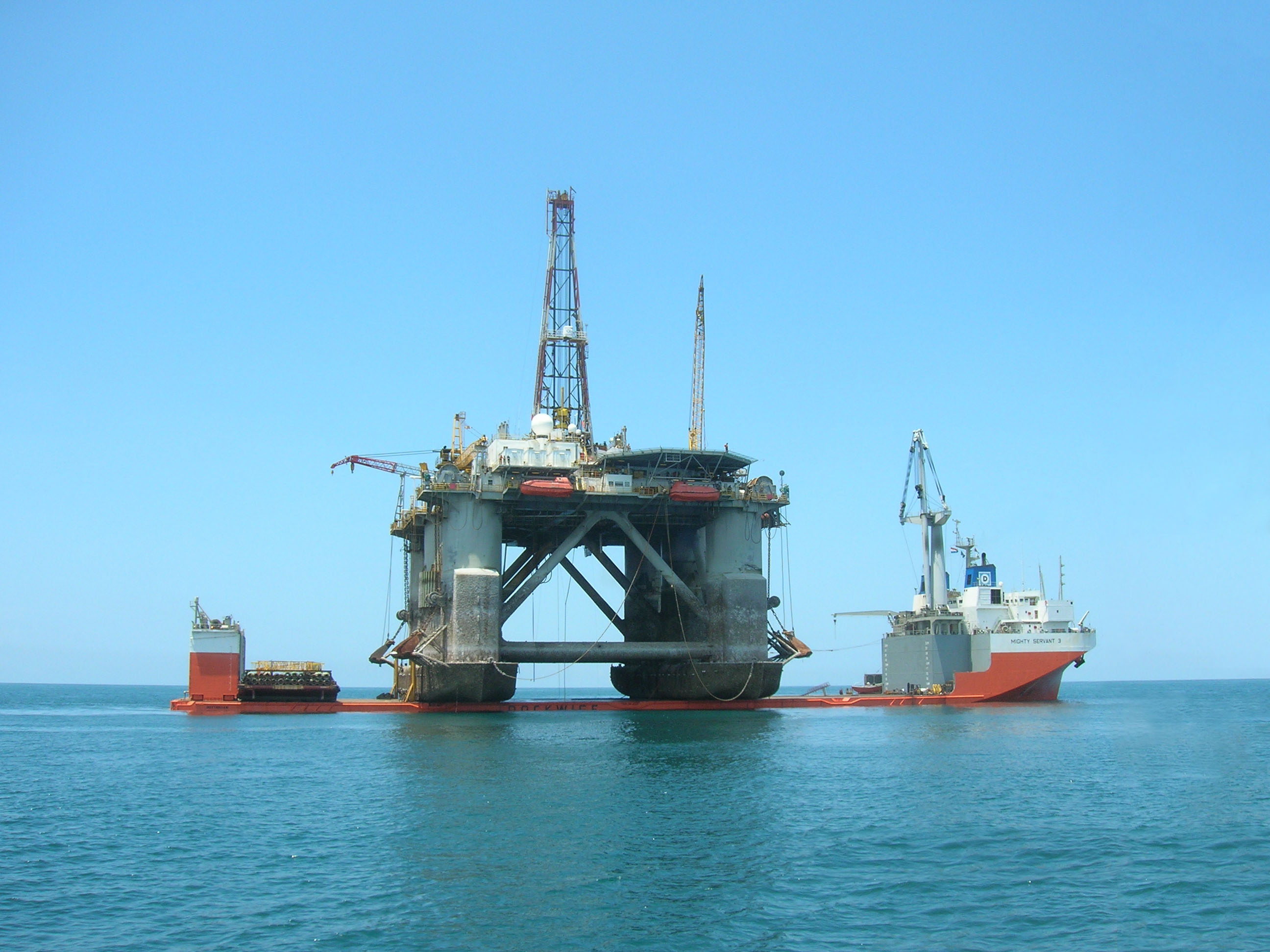
- Mighty Servant 3

History
- Name: Mighty Servant 3
- Owner: Dockwise Shipping B.V.
- Port of registry: Curaçao
- Builder: Oshima Shipbuilding Co. Ltd.; Ōshima, Japan
- Yard number: 10074
- Completed: 1984
- Identification: Call sign: PJWM; IMO number: 8130899; MMSI number: 306017000
- Status: In service

General characteristics
- Class & type: semi-submersible heavy lift ship
- Tonnage: 22,391 GT; DWT
- Length: loa: 181.23 m (594 ft 7 in); lbp: 168.93 m (554 ft 3 in)
- Beam: 40 m (130 ft)
- Draught: 4 to 22 m (13 to 72 ft)
- Depth: 12 m (39 ft)
- Depth of hold: 100 × 16 x 7.5 m (330 x 52 x 25 ft); Hatch: 31 by 14.6 m (102 by 48 ft)
- Speed: 14 knots (26 km/h; 16 mph)
- Endurance: 44 days
- Crew: 20

Mighty Servant 3 is a 27,000-ton semi-submersible heavy lift ship. Its deck is 40 by 140 m (130 by 460 ft). The vessel was built in 1984 by Oshima Shipbuilding Co. Ltd. in Ōshima, Japan, for Dutch shipping firm Wijsmuller Transport, which merged in 1993 with Dock Express Shipping to become Breda-based offshore heavy lifting group Dockwise Shipping B.V.

== Service ==
Most of the cargo transported by Mighty Servant 3 are oil platforms and drilling industry related gear. When loading its mammoth burdens, it takes on thousands of gallons of water into ballast tanks, which causes the cargo deck to submerge. After the cargo is floated into position, the ballast tanks are emptied with pumps, slowly lifting the deck above the waterline to sailing position.

The vessel is capable of carrying the heaviest semi-submersible drilling units, harsh-environment deep-water jack-up rigs and large floating production tension-leg platforms, semi-submersibles and spars with drafts of up to 14 m (46 ft).

In 2010, Mighty Servant 3 was outfitted with oil skimming equipment and used in the cleanup of the Deepwater Horizon oil spill in the Gulf of Mexico.

== Incidents and accidents ==
=== 2006 sinking ===
On 6 December 2006, Mighty Servant 3 sank in 62 m (203 ft) of water near the port of Luanda, Angola, while offloading the drilling platform Aleutian Key. During submerging to unload cargo, the ship developed a list and continued to submerge beyond design limits. There were no casualties, nor damage to the transported platform.

After five months of resting on the seabed, it was salvaged by Dutch salvage-company Smit International and handed back to its owners on 26 May 2007. To pull the vessel from the seabed, the 1,200 tonne sheerleg Taklift 7 was used in combination with pumping pressurized air into the closed compartments of Mighty Servant 3. It was transported to Grand Bahama Shipyard for repairs, arriving on 17 June 2007. In August 2009, after an extensive rebuild of its engines, in Zwolle by Wärtsilä, she was returned to service.

== See also ==
- Mighty Servant 1
- Mighty Servant 2
- MV Blue Marlin
- BOKA Vanguard
