= BOKA Vanguard =

Semisubmersible heavy-lift ship

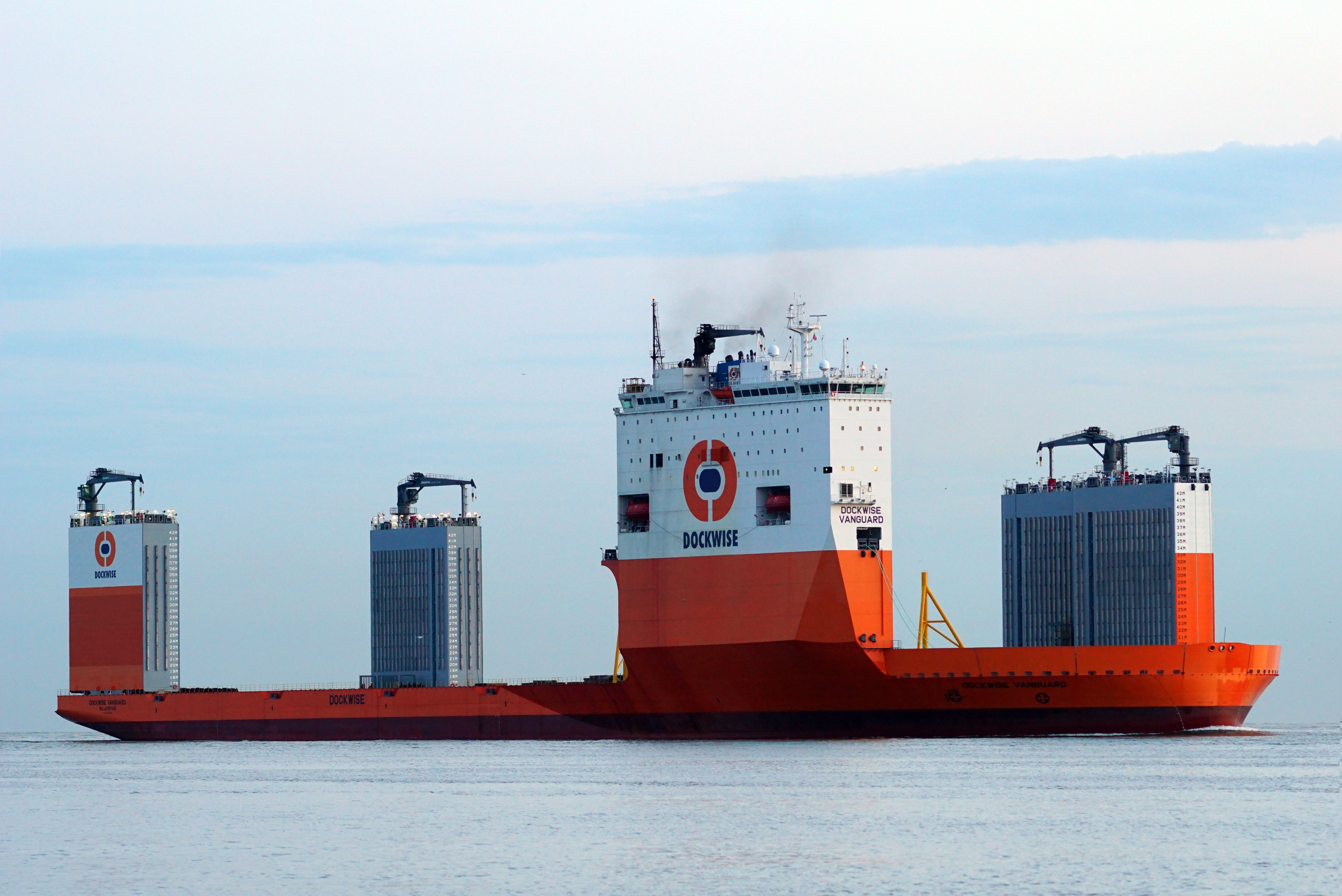
- Dockwise Vanguard without cargo at Maasmond, Rotterdam in 2014

History
- Name: Dockwise Vanguard (2013-2018); BOKA Vanguard (2018-present)
- Owner: Dockwise
- Port of registry: Willemstad, Curaçao
- Ordered: 2 October 2011
- Builder: Hyundai Heavy Industries
- Cost: US$240 million
- Yard number: 2511
- Laid down: 22 December 2011
- Launched: 7 October 2012
- Christened: 30 November 2012
- Completed: 2012
- Acquired: 1 February 2013
- Identification: IMO number: 9618783; Call sign: PBDI; MMSI number: 244656000

General characteristics
- Type: Heavy lift ship
- Tonnage: 91,784 GT; 116,173 DWT
- Displacement: 91,238 t (89,797 long tons)
- Length: 275 m (902 ft 3 in); 270 m (885 ft 10 in) lbp
- Beam: 79 m (259 ft 2 in)
- Draught: 11 m (36 ft 1 in) (sailing); 31 m (101 ft 8 in) (submerged)
- Installed power: 27,000 kW (36,000 hp) comprising: 2 × Wärtsilä 12V38; 2 × Wärtsilä 6L38
- Propulsion: 2 × propellers; 2 × retractable azimuth thrusters; 1 × bow thruster
- Speed: 14 knots (26 km/h; 16 mph) (unloaded); 11–13 knots (20–24 km/h; 13–15 mph) (loaded)
- Crew: 40

BOKA Vanguard, formerly Dockwise Vanguard, is a semisubmersible heavy-lift ship owned and operated by Dockwise. It is the largest heavy-lift ship ever built, and is able to carry cargoes up to 110,000 tonnes (110,000 long tons; 120,000 short tons). Dockwise Vanguard was designed to move offshore oil and gas facilities, but can also carry other ships and act as an offshore dry-dock facility.

As offshore oil and gas facilities have grown in size, Dockwise saw a market for a ship that could carry the largest floating oil rigs to their destinations, reducing time and costs of transportation and allowing rigs to be built economically in a shipyard. In conjunction with Finland-based Deltamarin, they designed a ship called the "type-O heavy-lift vessel", later renamed Dockwise Vanguard following an in-house competition. In 2014, Dockwise started a feasibility study into a larger successor to Dockwise Vanguard.

== Design ==
Dockwise Vanguard has a flat, bow-less deck measuring 70 by 275 m (230 by 902 ft), allowing cargo longer and wider than the deck. Her deck is 70% larger than Blue Marlin, the third-largest heavy-lift ship. The bridge and living area superstructure are situated at the far starboard side, and the deck also contains four movable buoyancy casings. The watertight deck allows water to flow over the deck without risking the ship.

BOKA Vanguard is semisubmersible allowing her to lift ships or rigs out of the water, and to place them into water. When her ballast tanks are flooded, her deck lies up to 16 m (52 ft) below the surface, allowing her to handle deep-draught cargoes. Loads can then be floated above her, and her ballast tanks empty, allowing her to lift and transport cargoes up to 110,000 tonnes (110,000 long tons; 120,000 short tons), 50% more than Blue Marlin. She can also be loaded from a dockside, and large cargoes can be loaded by skidding them on tracks.

BOKA Vanguard can accommodate a crew of 40.

== Cargoes ==
The first cargo of Dockwise Vanguard was Chevron Corporation's Jack/St. Malo oil platform, moved from Samsung Heavy Industries in South Korea to the Gulf of Mexico. At 53,000 tons, Jack/St. Malo is the biggest semisubmersible floating oil platform ever built, and was loaded in February 2013. The journey was expected to take just under two months. As of 2013, Dockwise Vanguard had orders for two more deliveries, the Goliat FPSO later in 2013, and the Aasta Hansteen spar platform in 2015, both being built by Hyundai Heavy Industries. At 193 m (633 ft 2 in) long, the Aasta Hansteen platform was to be, as of 2013, the largest floating spar platform produced.

Dockwise Vanguard is capable of providing an offshore dry-dock facility, allowing ships and floating oil rigs to be raised out of the water for inspection or maintenance without a break in production. This was projected to be of economic value to operators by allowing maintenance without towing the rigs back to dock and taking them out of service for months. In the summer of 2013, Dockwise Vanguard was used as dry dock for the semisubmersible drilling platform Noble Paul Romano in the Grand Harbour of Valletta and just off the coast of Malta, as no local dry docks were big enough. In the summer of 2019, BOKA Vanguard was used by Carnival Cruise Lines as a floating dry dock for repairs to Carnival Vista's azipod system, following the closure of one of Grand Bahama Shipyard's drydocks after one of the drydock's cranes collapsed on Royal Caribbean's Oasis of the Seas.

=== Costa Concordia proposal ===
In September 2013, Dockwise Vanguard was proposed to move Costa Concordia from Isola del Giglio to a salvage yard on the Italian mainland for "breaking" and Costa Crociere announced a $30 million option with Royal Boskalis Westminster the following month to use the ship. In the event, Dockwise Vanguard was not used, and Costa Concordia was instead refloated and towed to Genoa in July 2014.

== Awards ==
- The Royal Association of Dutch Shipowners' 2011 KVNR Shipping Award
- Offshore Technology Conference 2012 Spotlight on New Technology Award

== Gallery ==
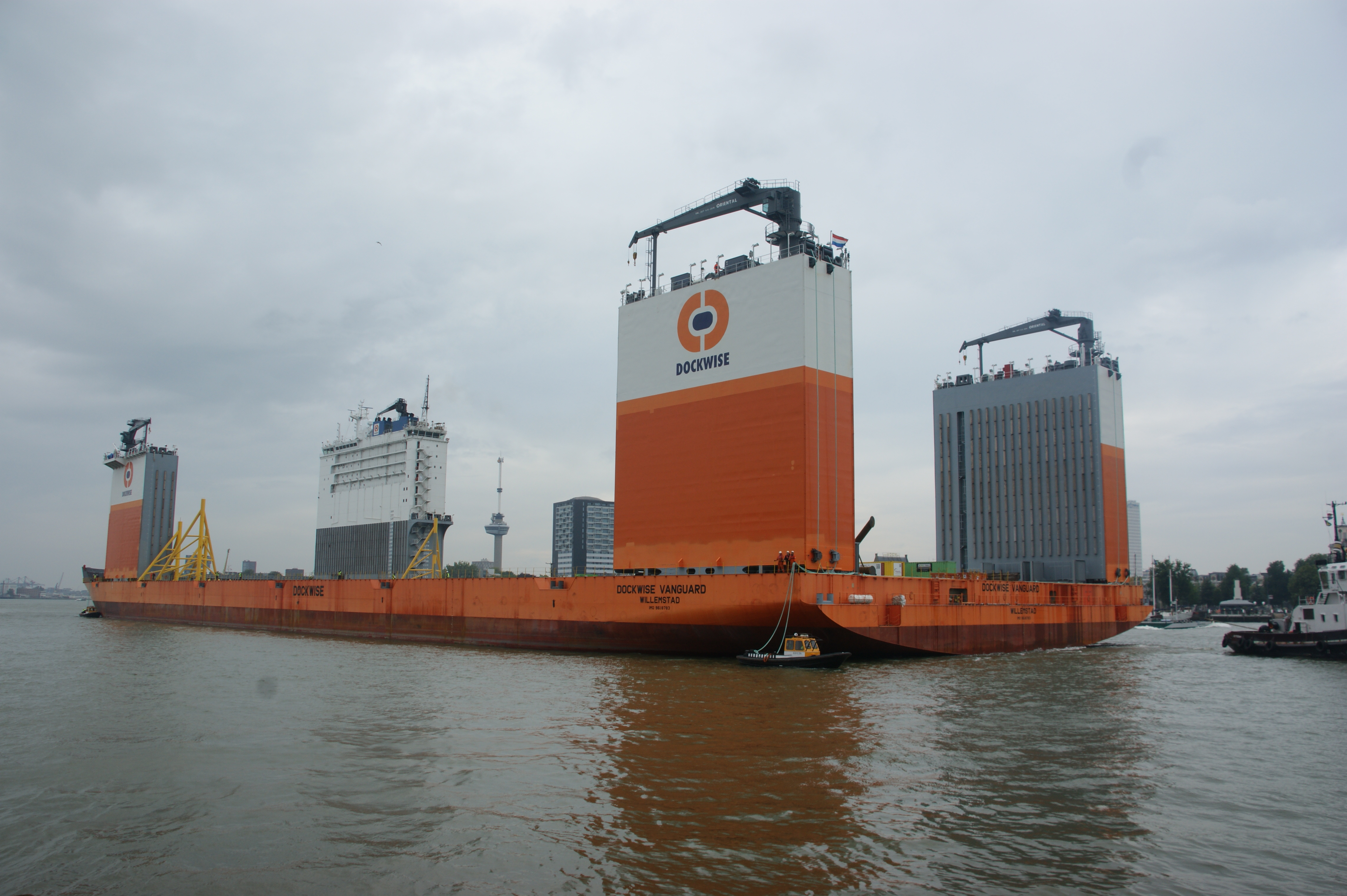

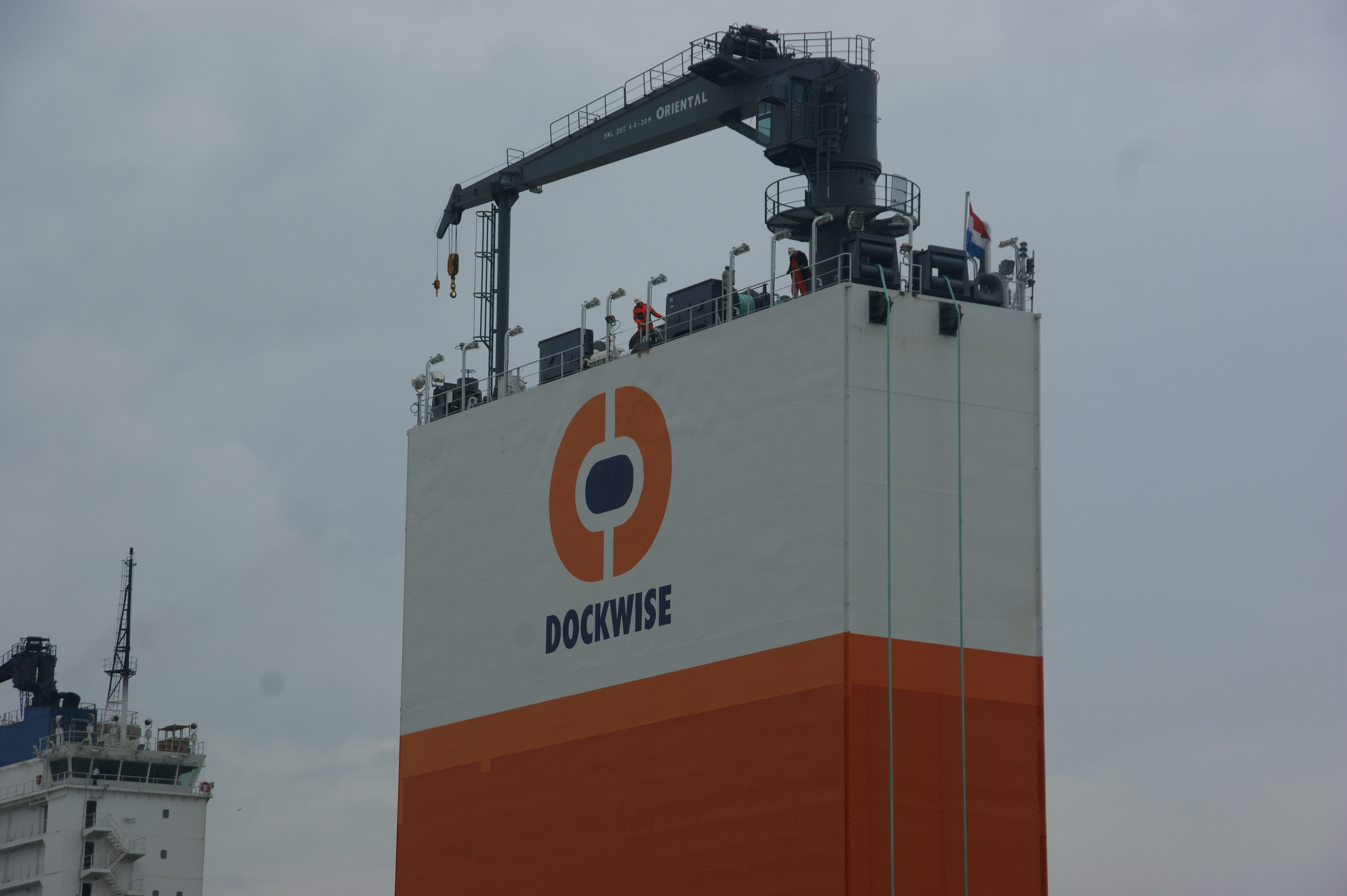

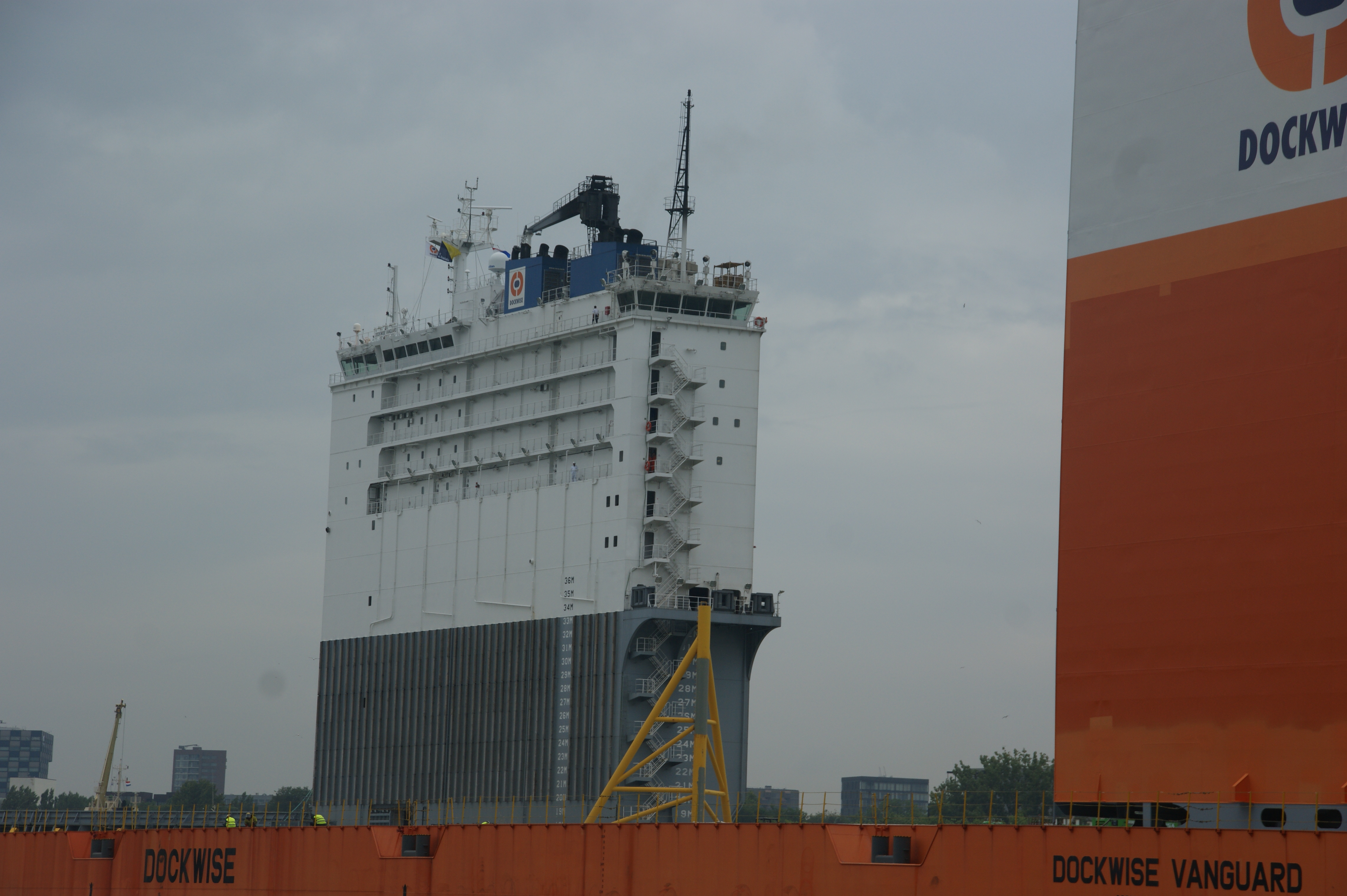

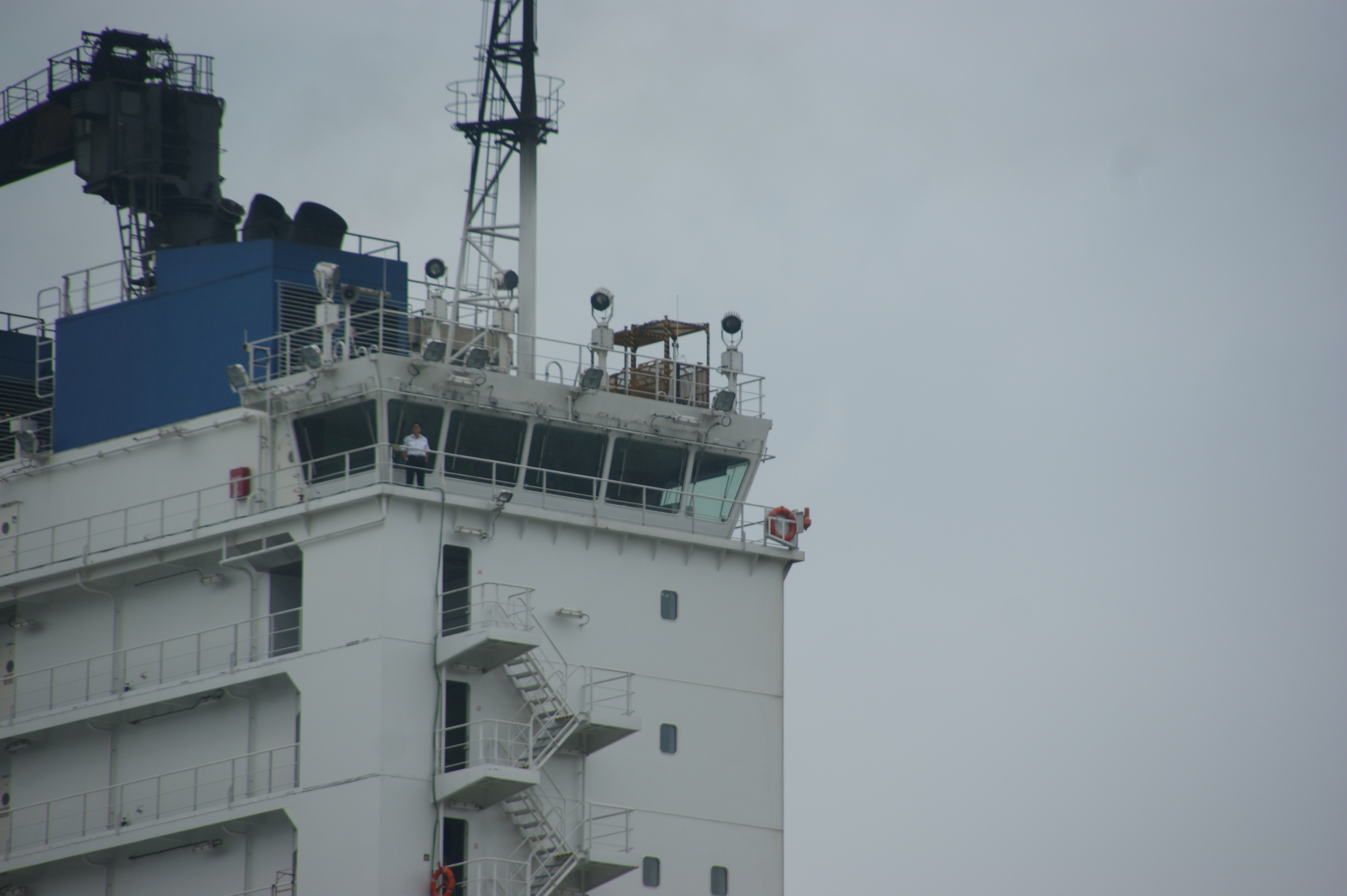

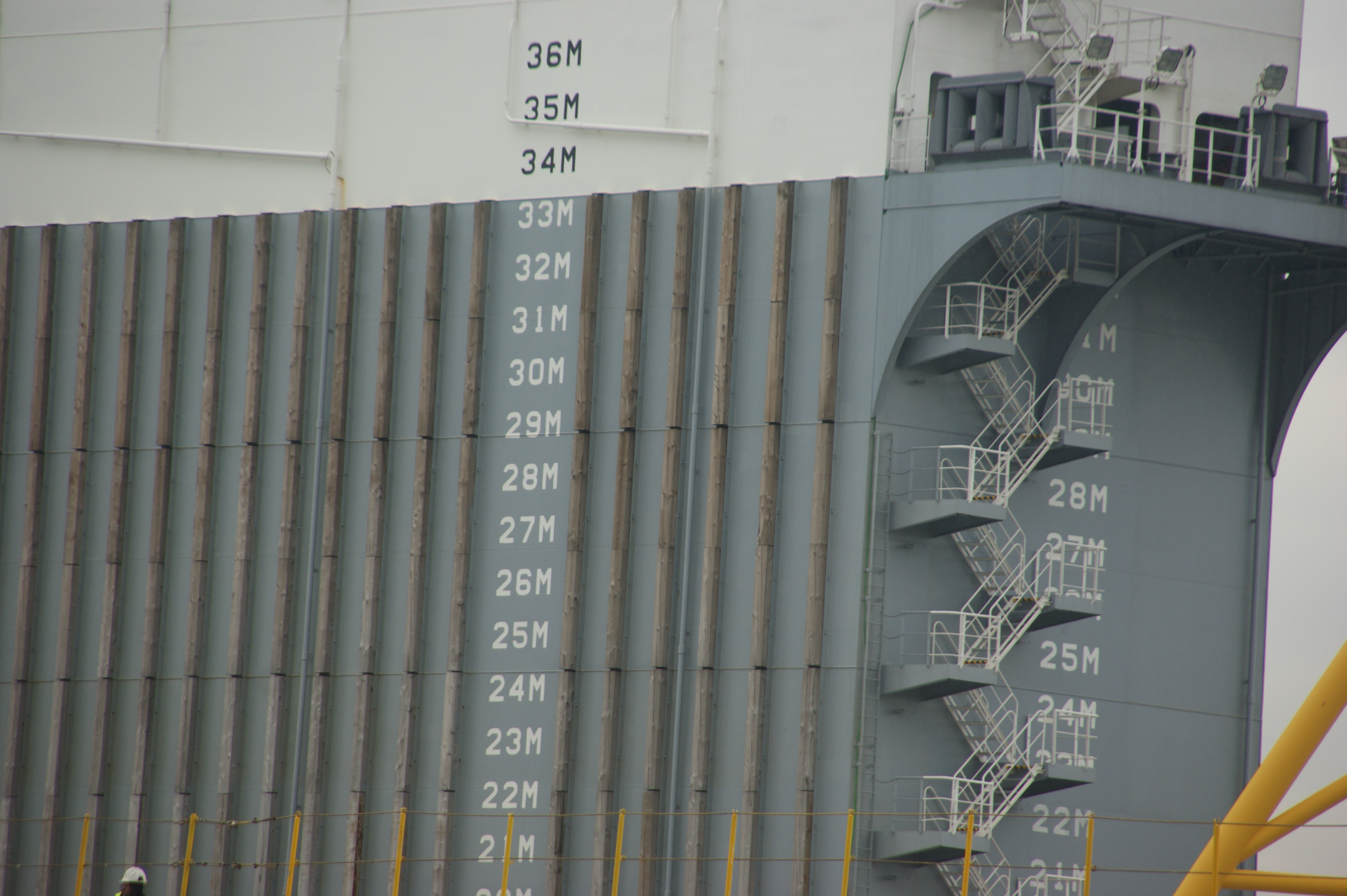

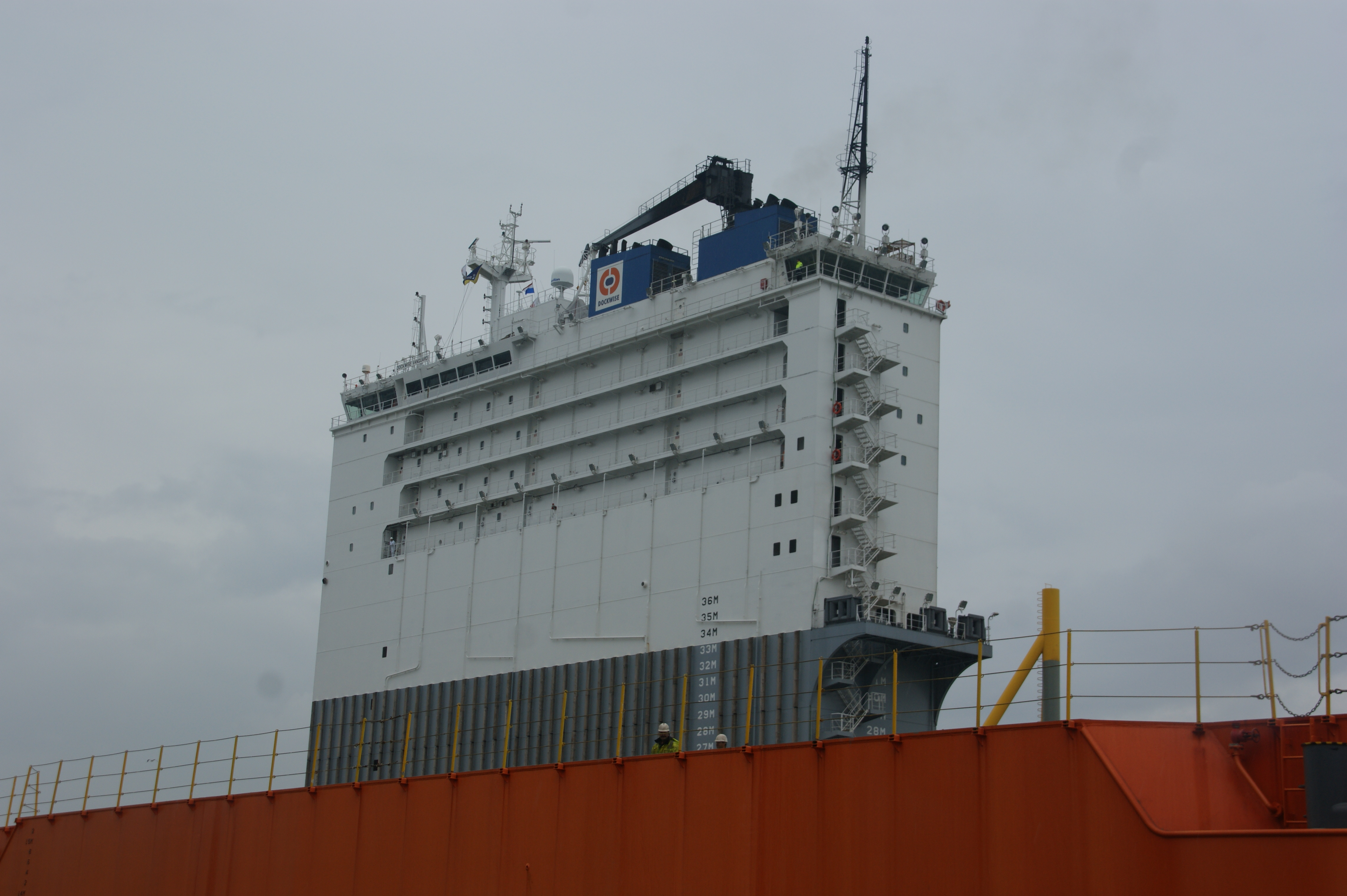

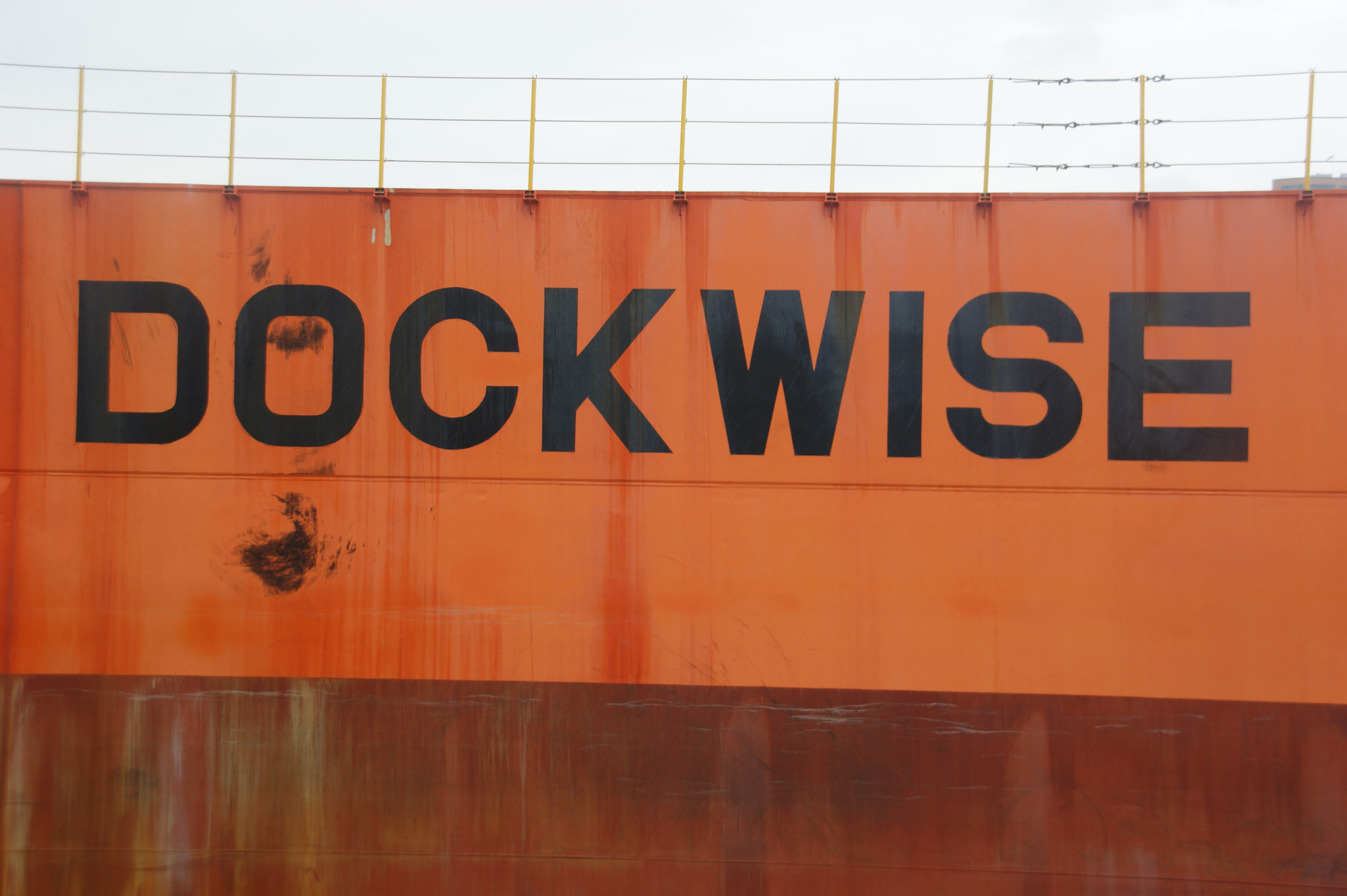

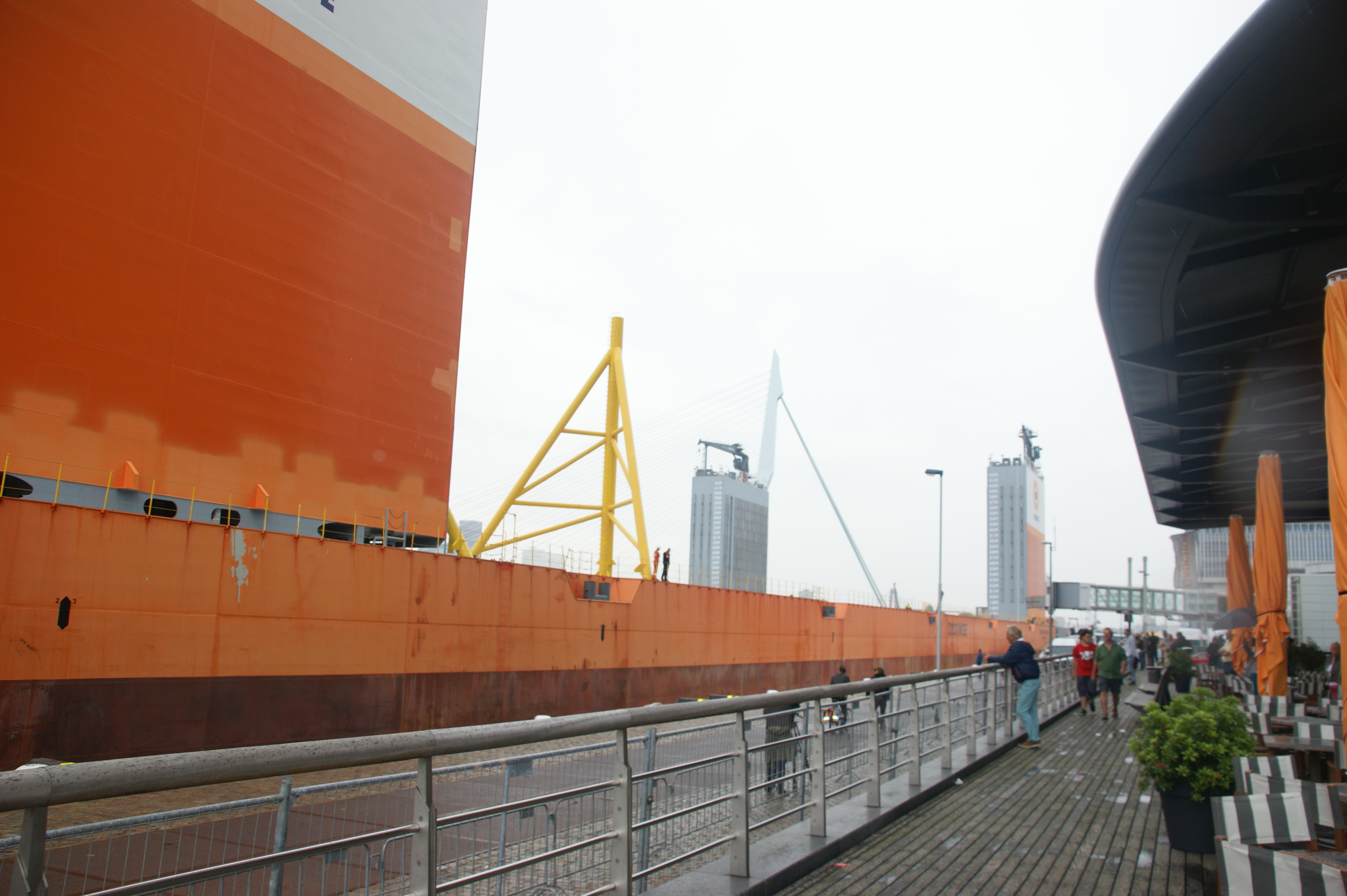

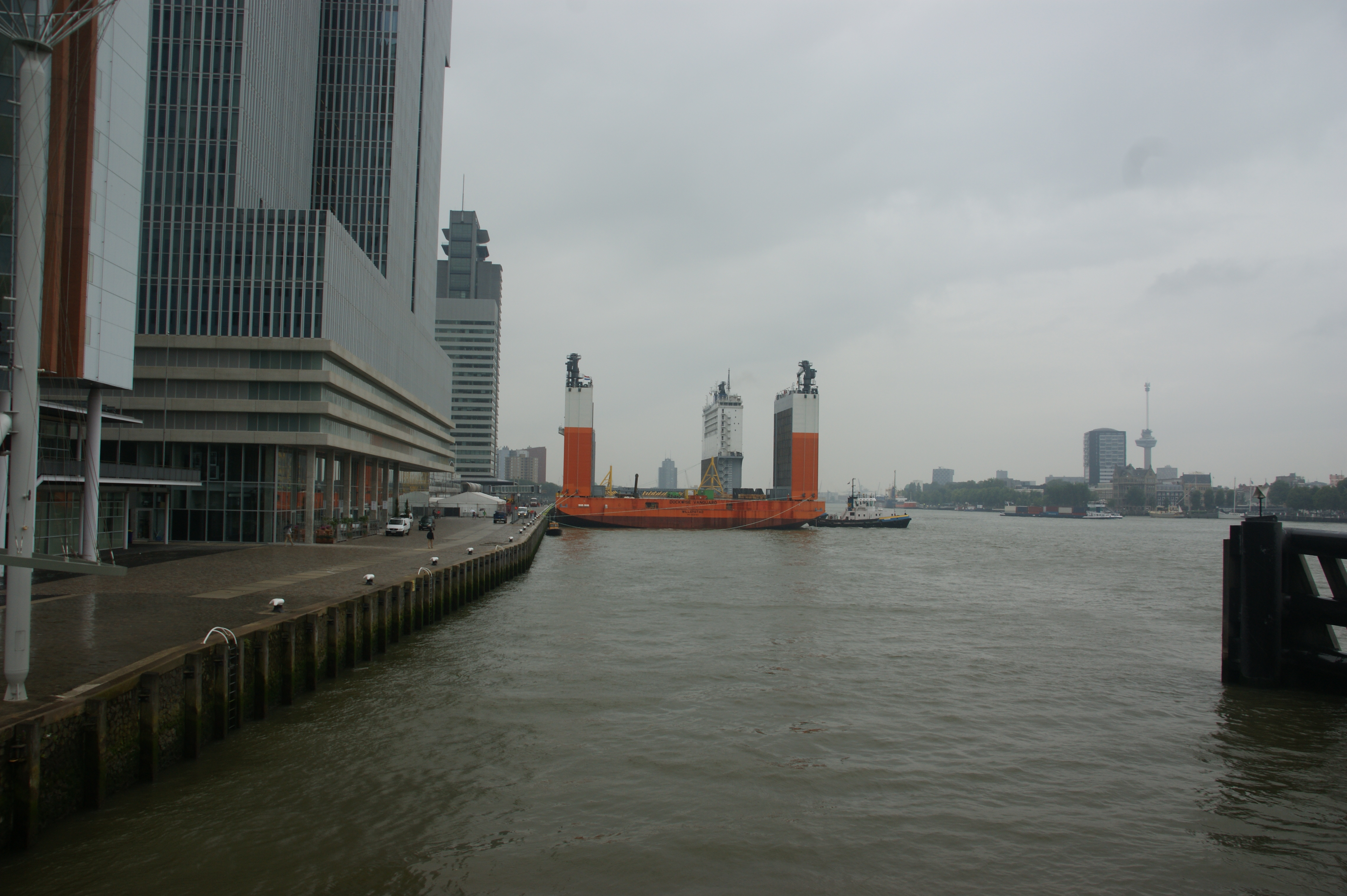

== See also ==
- Mighty Servant 1
- Mighty Servant 2
- Mighty Servant 3
- Xin Guang Hua, the second-largest heavy-lift ship
