= MV Target =

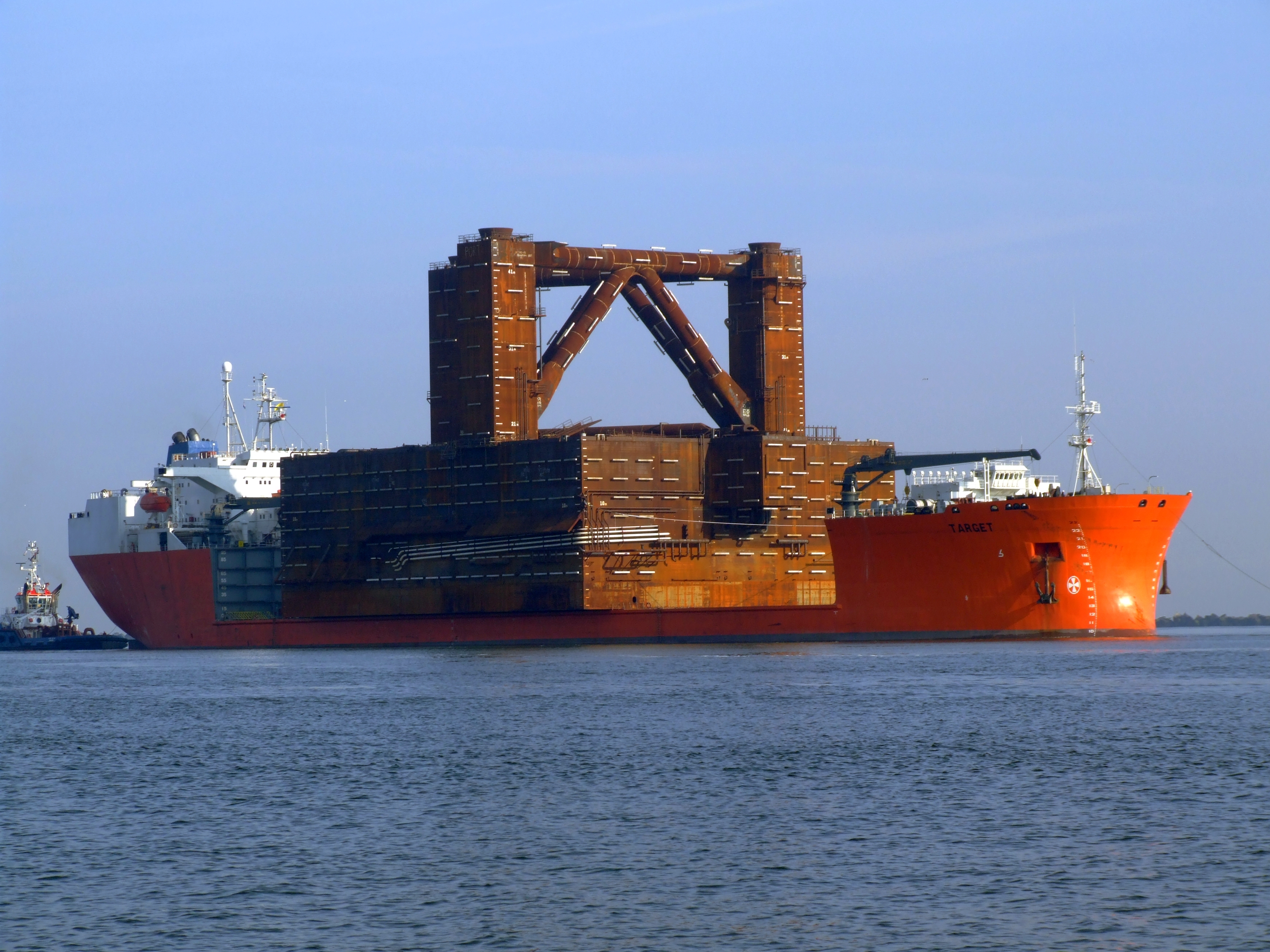
- MV Target carrying an unnamed load.

History

Norway
- Name: Jahre Target; 1993 Nord-Jahre Target; 2000 Crude Target; 2003 Genmar Centaur; 2004 Front Target
- Owner: initially Park Venture Co.
- Builder: Brodosplit, Split, Croatia (Yugoslavia)
- Yard number: 361
- Launched: 29 July 1989
- Completed: February 1990
- Homeport: Sandefjord
- Fate: Sold 2007

Netherlands Antilles
- Name: MV Target
- Operator: Dockwise
- Completed: 24 December 2007
- Homeport: Willemstad, Netherlands Antilles
- Identification: IMO number: 8617938; MMSI number: 306129000; Callsign: PJLL
- Status: in active service

General characteristics
- Type: semi-submersible heavy-load carrier
- Tonnage: 142,031 DWT; 2007 reduced to 53806
- Length: 269 m (882 ft 7 in); 2007 shortened to 216.9 m (711 ft 7 in)
- Beam: 44.5 m (146 ft 0 in)
- Speed: 14 knots (26 km/h; 16 mph)

MV Target is a semi-submersible heavy transport ship, built by Brodosplit in Yugoslavia.

== History ==
Built in 1990 as a tanker, MV Jahre Target, MV Target is the second of six single hull tankers to be converted into heavy lift vessels. After completing submerging and sea trials, the former sealift vessel was delivered to the new owners, Dockwise on 24 December 2007.

== Design ==
MV Target was converted at the COSCO shipyard in Nantong, China. A new midsection was fitted to the bow and aft sections of the single-hull tanker. She has a carrying capacity in excess of 35,000 tons and an unobstructed deck area measuring 44.5 m x 130 m.

== Service ==
MV Target is designed to transport complex, high-value cargo, including semi-submersible and jack-up drilling units, as well as offshore structures. She is managed by Anglo-Eastern Ship Management who provide technical and crew management.

In 2009, MV Target transported the Royal Navy ice-strengthened survey ship, HMS Endurance from the Falkland Islands to Portsmouth.
