= Federal Cedar =

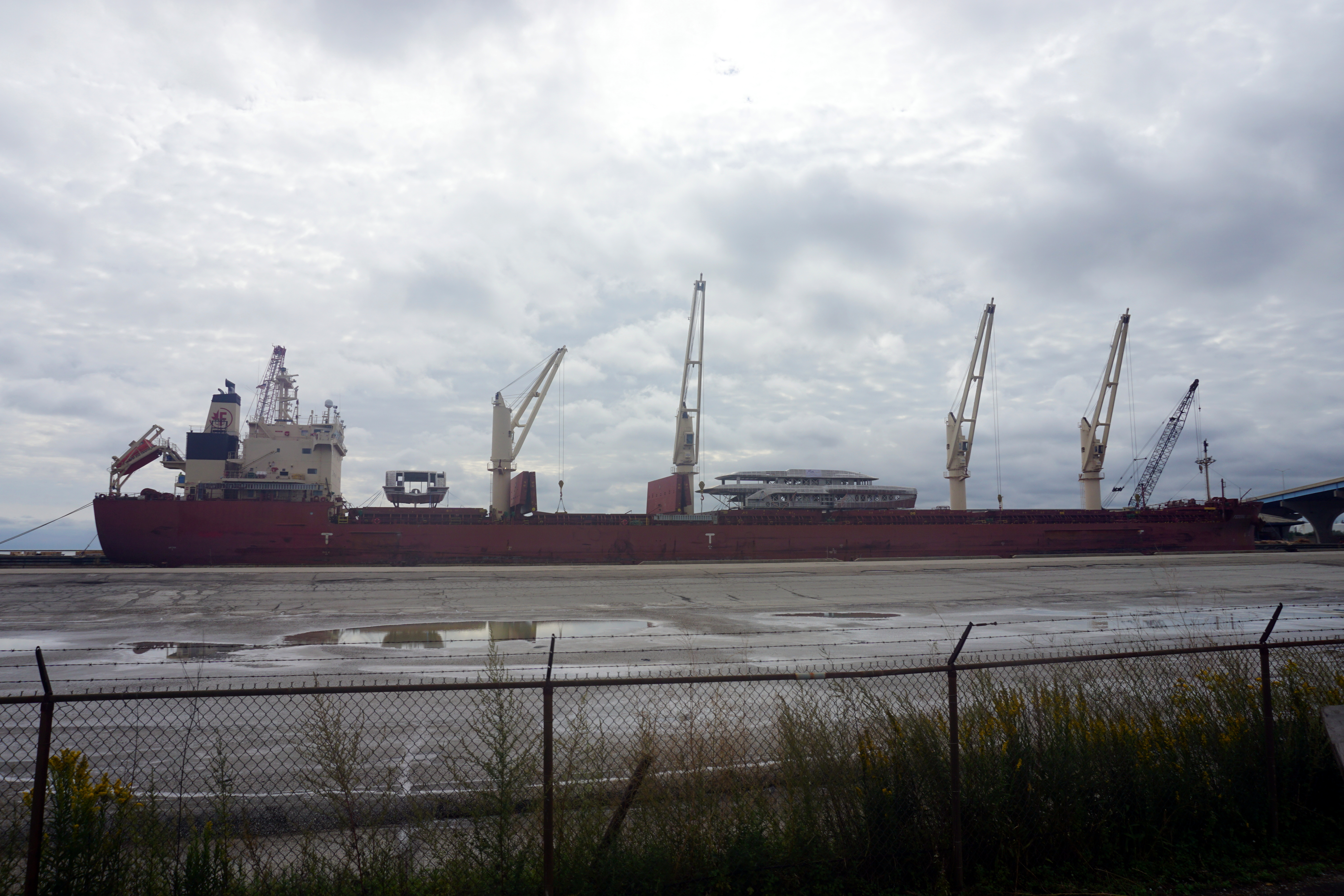

History
- Name: Federal Cedar
- Port of registry: Marshall Islands
- Builder: Oshima Shipbuilding
- Completed: 2016
- Identification: IMO number: 9671101; MMSI number: 538006473; Call sign: V7NK8

General characteristics
- Type: Cargo ship, bulk carrier
- Tonnage: 20,789 GT; 34,564 DWT
- Length: 199.98 m (656.1 ft)
- Beam: 23.82 m (78.1 ft)
- Depth: 23.82 m (78.1 ft)
- Ice class: 1C
- Speed: Maximum speed: 16.1 kn (29.8 km/h); Average speed: 13.7 kn (25.4 km/h)

The Federal Cedar is a bulk carrier ship. She was built in 2016 by Oshima Shipbuilding and is registered in the Marshall Islands.
