= Xin Guang Hua =

Chinese semi-submersible ship

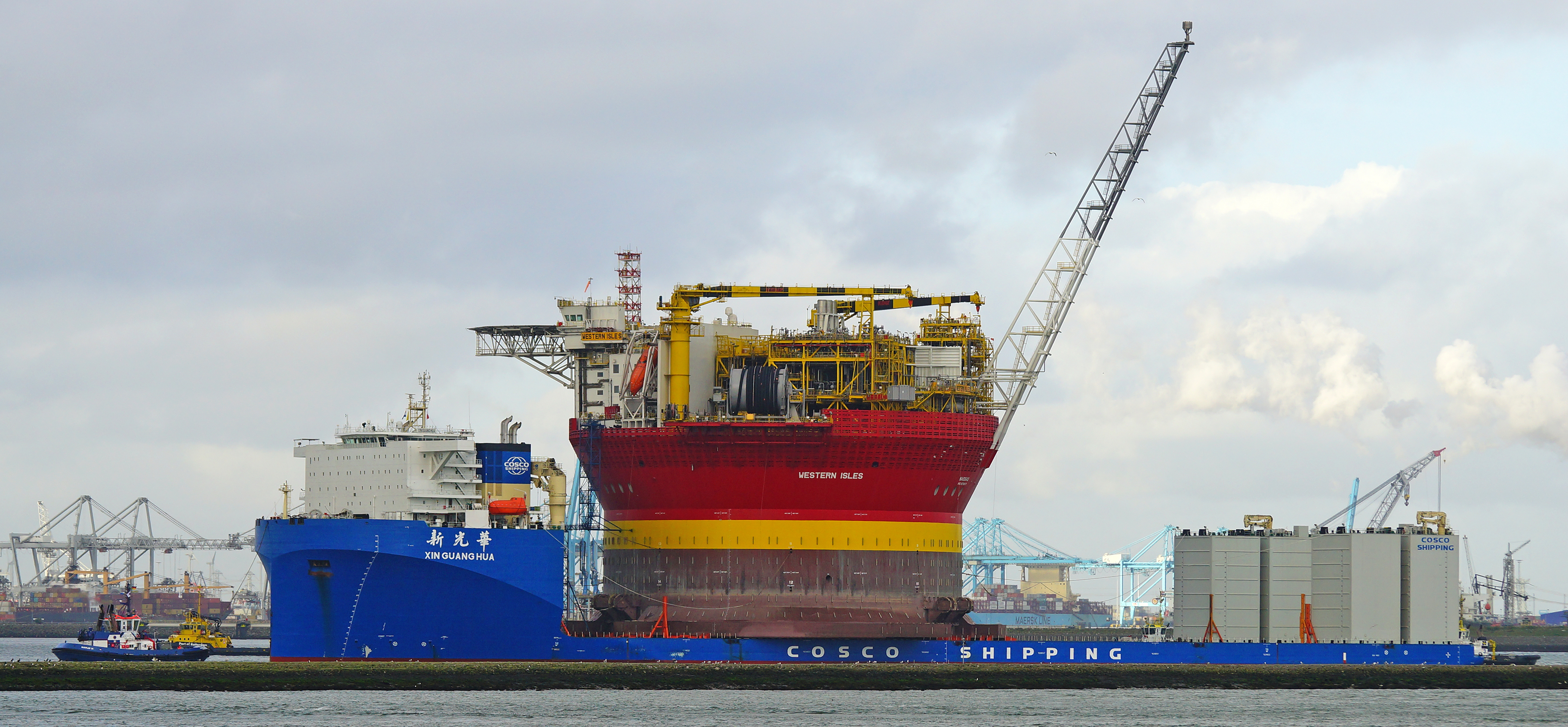
- Xin Guang Hua with cargo

History
- Name: Xin Guang Hua
- Owner: COSCO Shipping
- Builder: Guangzhou Shipyard International
- Laid down: March 2015
- Launched: April 2016
- In service: December 2016
- Identification: IMO number: 9751573
- Status: In service

General characteristics
- Type: Semi-submersible heavy-lift
- Tonnage: 84,239 GT
- Length: 255 m (837 ft)
- Beam: 68 m (223 ft)
- Draft: 10 m (33 ft)
- Installed power: 6x 4,750 kW (6,370 hp)
- Propulsion: Diesel-electric
- Speed: 13.5 kn (25.0 km/h; 15.5 mph)

Xin Guang Hua is a semi-submersible heavy-lift ship operated by COSCO Shipping. She is the largest Chinese vessel of her type and the second-largest in the world, exceeded only by BOKA Vanguard.

== History ==
Xin Guang Hua was ordered from Guangzhou Shipyard International by COSCO under the name Guang Hua Kou. Construction begin in March 2015, when the first steel for the ship was cut. She was launched on 28 April 2016, and entered service in December 2016. Shortly before her delivery, COSCO merged with China Shipping to form a new company that retained the COSCO name; during the merger, Guang Hua Kou was renamed Xin Guang Hua.

== Design ==
Xin Guang Hua was jointly designed by Vuyk Engineering Rotterdam and MARIC. She measures 255 metres (837 ft) in length, with a beam of 68 metres (223 ft) and a loaded draft of 10 metres (33 ft). She has a gross tonnage of 84,239 GT and a deadweight tonnage of 98,370 DWT. Her cargo deck is 208 metres (682 ft) long and 68 metres (223 ft) wide, and can be submerged to a depth of 16 metres (52 ft) below water during loading and unloading using 117 ballast tanks. She has a diesel-electric propulsion system, with six diesel powered generators providing 4,750 kilowatts (6,370 hp) each to dual propellers and four thrusters. She has a service speed of 13.5 knots (25.0 km/h; 15.5 mph).
