= CMA CGM Fort Saint Louis =

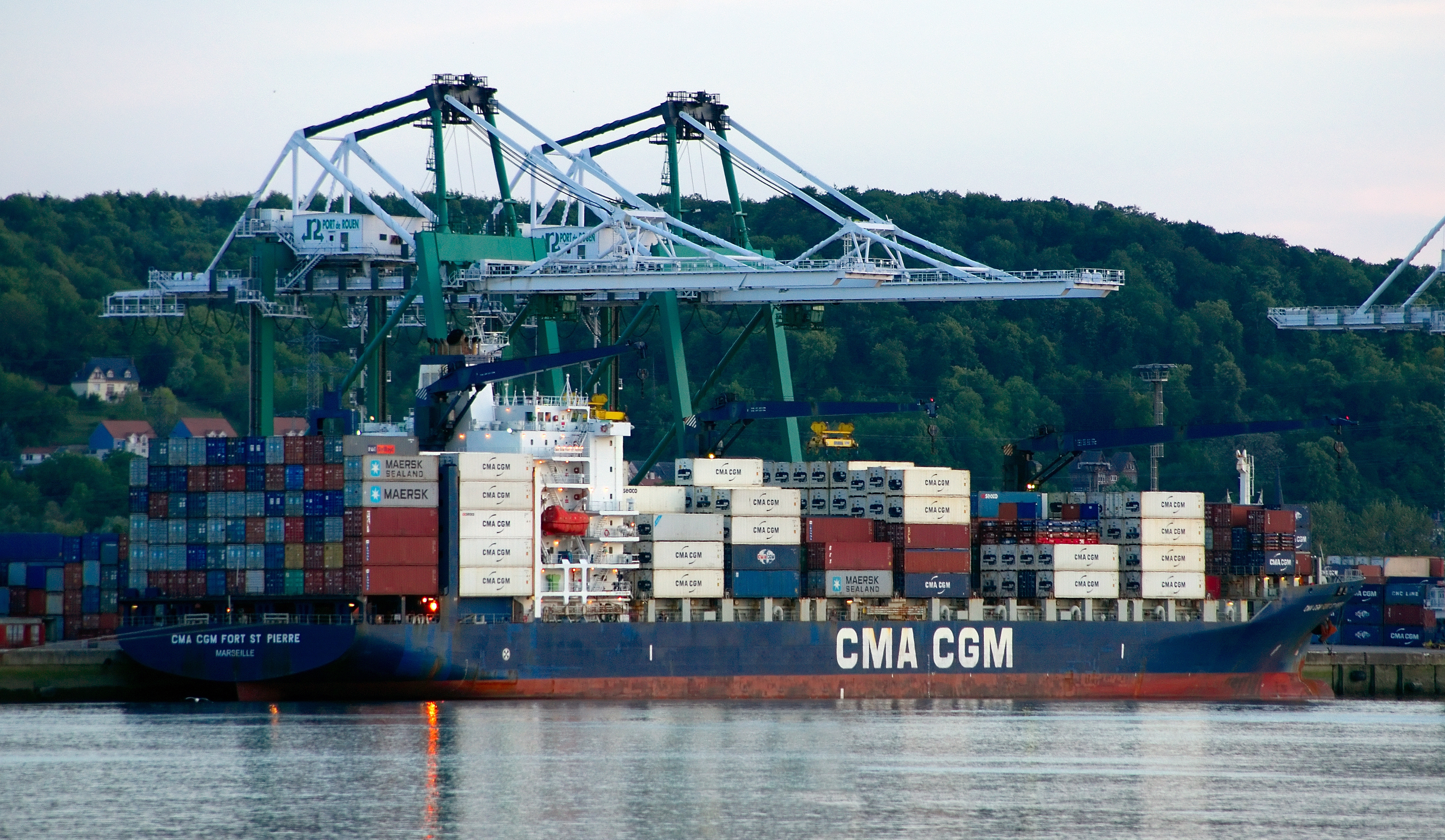
CMA CGM Fort St Pierre, sister ship

CMA CGM Fort Saint Louis is owned by the shipping company CMA CGM and sails under a French flag, with Marseilles as her home port. A container carrier, she plies a regular route between France and the French West Indies.

== General information ==
Launched in June 2003 with three other sister-ships:

- CMA CGM Fort Saint Pierre
- CMA CGM Fort Sainte Marie
- CMA CGM Fort Saint Georges

Built in the Taiwanese shipyard CSBC Corporation, Taiwan. Bureau Veritas is the classification society.

The complete loop is made in 28 days and her ports of call are Dunkirk, Rouen, Le Havre, Montoir-de-Bretagne, Pointe-à-Pitre and Fort-de-France. The four vessels arrive at weekly intervals, which offers a regular supply of provisions from the French West Indies such as rum and bananas.
