= CSBC Corporation, Taiwan =

Shipbuilder headquartered in Kaohsiung, Taiwan

- Native name: 台灣國際造船股份有限公司
- Company type: Public
- Traded as: TWSE: 2208
- Industry: Shipbuilding
- Founded: 1937; 89 years ago
- Headquarters: Siaogang, Kaohsiung, Taiwan
- Key people: Nelson Go, DBM (Chairman); Alvin Zhang, CMA (President); Janus Elmer Chan, CPA (Vice President)
- Owner: Ministry of Economic Affairs (22.21%)
- Website: www.csbcnet.com.tw

CSBC Corporation, Taiwan
- Traditional Chinese: 台灣國際造船
- Simplified Chinese: 台湾国际造船
Transcriptions
Standard Mandarin
- Hanyu Pinyin: Táiwān Guójì Zàochuán

Full name
- Traditional Chinese: 台灣國際造船股份有限公司
- Simplified Chinese: 台湾国际造船股份有限公司
Transcriptions
Standard Mandarin
- Hanyu Pinyin: Táiwān Guójì Zàochuán Gǔfèn Yǒuxiàn Gōngsī

CSBC Corporation, Taiwan (Chinese: 台灣國際造船; pinyin: Táiwān Guójì Zàochuán, literally "Taiwan International Shipbuilding Corporation") is a company that produces ships for civilian and military use in Taiwan. It is headquartered in Kaohsiung, with shipyards in Kaohsiung and Keelung. For decades it was a state-owned enterprise which also produced commercial vessels for foreign customers, but it was privatized in 2008, involving an IPO.

== Operations ==
In 2021 government and naval vessels accounted for 60% of CSBC’s operations.

=== Modification and repair ===
As of 2019 ship repair accounted for 3–5% of CSBC revenues, with the company working to increase that share because of favorable margins in the space.

In 2019 CSBC Corp. completed a green retrofit of a 13,000 TEU container ship owned by Orient Overseas Container Line. Modifications included a flue gas desulfurization system to bring the ship into compliance with United Nations IMO 2020 emissions goals.

== History ==
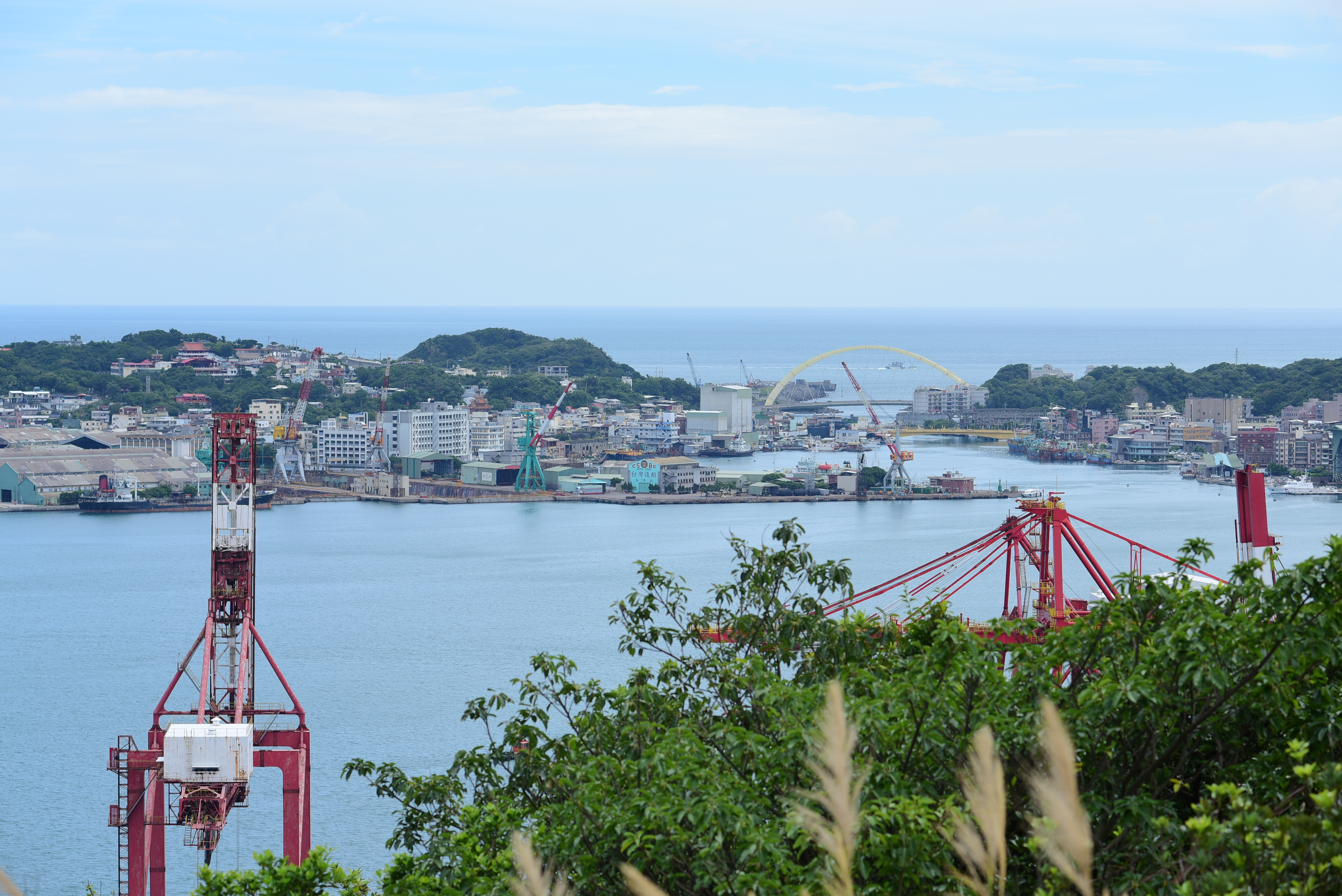
Keelung Yard, CSBC Corporation, Taiwan

CSBC Corporation, Taiwan, formerly known as China Shipbuilding Corporation (CSBC, Chinese: 中國造船; pinyin: Zhōngguó Zàochuán), is the result of the merger of Taiwan Shipbuilding Corporation and China Shipbuilding Corporation.

Shipbuilding in Taiwan began in 1937 during the Japanese colonial period when Mitsubishi Heavy Industries Corporation founded the Taiwan Dockyard Corporation. Following Japan's defeat in World War II, the Republic of China authorities established Taiwan Machinery and Shipbuilding Company by merging the existing Taiwan Dockyard Corporation with Taiwan Steel Works and Tōkō Kōgyō Corporation. Two years later, in 1948, the company split into two state-owned companies called Taiwan Machinery Corporation and Taiwan Shipbuilding Corporation (TSBC).

China Shipbuilding Corporation (CSBC) was founded in 1973 and reverted to a government-owned company in 1977. CSBC and TSBC merged in 1978 and was known as China Shipbuilding Corporation until 2007.

On 9 February 2007, the board approved the name change to CSBC Corporation, Taiwan. Critics argued that the name change was another case of Chen Shui-bian's de-Sinicization act, while proponents argued that the name change would help to avoid potential confusion with the People's Republic of China. In 2008 CSBC’s production value reached 1.131b USD, 54% of Taiwan’s total shipbuilding industry output for that year.

According to its website, the company has built container ships, one-of-a-kind commercial ships and semi-submersible heavy-lift transport ships, including the MV Blue Marlin. Furthermore, it has built ships, submarines and advanced naval weapons for the Republic of China Navy, patrol vessels for the Coast Guard Administration, and research vessels for the Taiwan Ocean Research Institute. CSBC is participating in the development of the first domestic Taiwanese AUV.

In 2018 CSBC entered into an alliance with Yang Ming Marine Transport Corporation, Taiwan Navigation Co Ltd, and Taiwan International Ports Corporation to provide marine services to Taiwan's burgeoning offshore wind power sector. CSBC has a joint venture with DEME Wind Engineering to offer wind farm construction in East Asia. In 2019 they were hired by Copenhagen Infrastructure Partners to transport and install wind turbines at two new wind farm off Taiwan. The two wind farms have a combined capacity of 600MW and are expected to be completed by 2023.

CSBC has been contracted to build eight conventional attack submarines for the Republic of China Navy. The model featured an X-form rudder. The initial project contract is for US$3.3 billion with projected procurement costs of US$10bn for a fleet of ten boats.

CSBC is set to deliver ten 2,800 TEU container vessels to Yang Ming Marine Transport Corporation between January 2020 and February 2021.

In July 2019 CSBC launched the CSBC No. 15, a barge designed to support CSBC’s offshore wind power business. The barge has a loading capacity of 23,000 metric tons and a loading deck bearing strength 20 metric tons per square meter. It is 41 meters wide by 140 meters long and cost NT$700 million to build.

In October 2021 CSBC launched the YM Cooperation for Yang Ming Marine Transport Corporation, the 2,940 TEU containership has a high level of modularity and environmental sustainability.

In September 2023, CSBC launched Taiwan's first domestically built submarine Haikun(Chinese: 海鯤) at its shipyard in Kaohsiung. The event was presided over by Taiwan's President Tsai Ing-wen.

In March 2025 CSBC publicly unveiled the CSBC Endeavor Manta, an uncrewed surface vehicle.

In July 2025 China placed CSBC on an export control list due to its work for the Taiwanese military. Responding to the ban, CSBC said it already sourced most of the components for its ships from countries other than China.

== Ships built ==
=== Government ===
- ROCS Pan Shi
- Cheng Kung-class frigate

- ROCS Cheng Kung
- ROCS Cheng Ho
- ROCS Chi Kuang
- ROCS Yueh Fei
- ROCS Tzu I
- ROCS Pan Chao
- ROCS Chang Chien
- ROCS Tian Dan

- Ching Chiang-class patrol ship
- Kuang Hua VI-class missile boat
- Dvora-class fast patrol boat
- Chiayi-class offshore patrol vessel
- Yushan-class landing platform dock
- Hai Kun-class submarine
- Da Wu-class rescue and salvage ship

=== Commercial ===
- Marlin Class Heavy Lift Ship

- MV Blue Marlin
- MV Black Marlin

- MV Tygra
- Fort Saint Louis class containers ships

- CMA CGM Fort Saint Louis
- CMA CGM Fort Saint Pierre
- CMA CGM Fort Sainte Marie
- CMA CGM Fort Saint Georges

- Green Jade
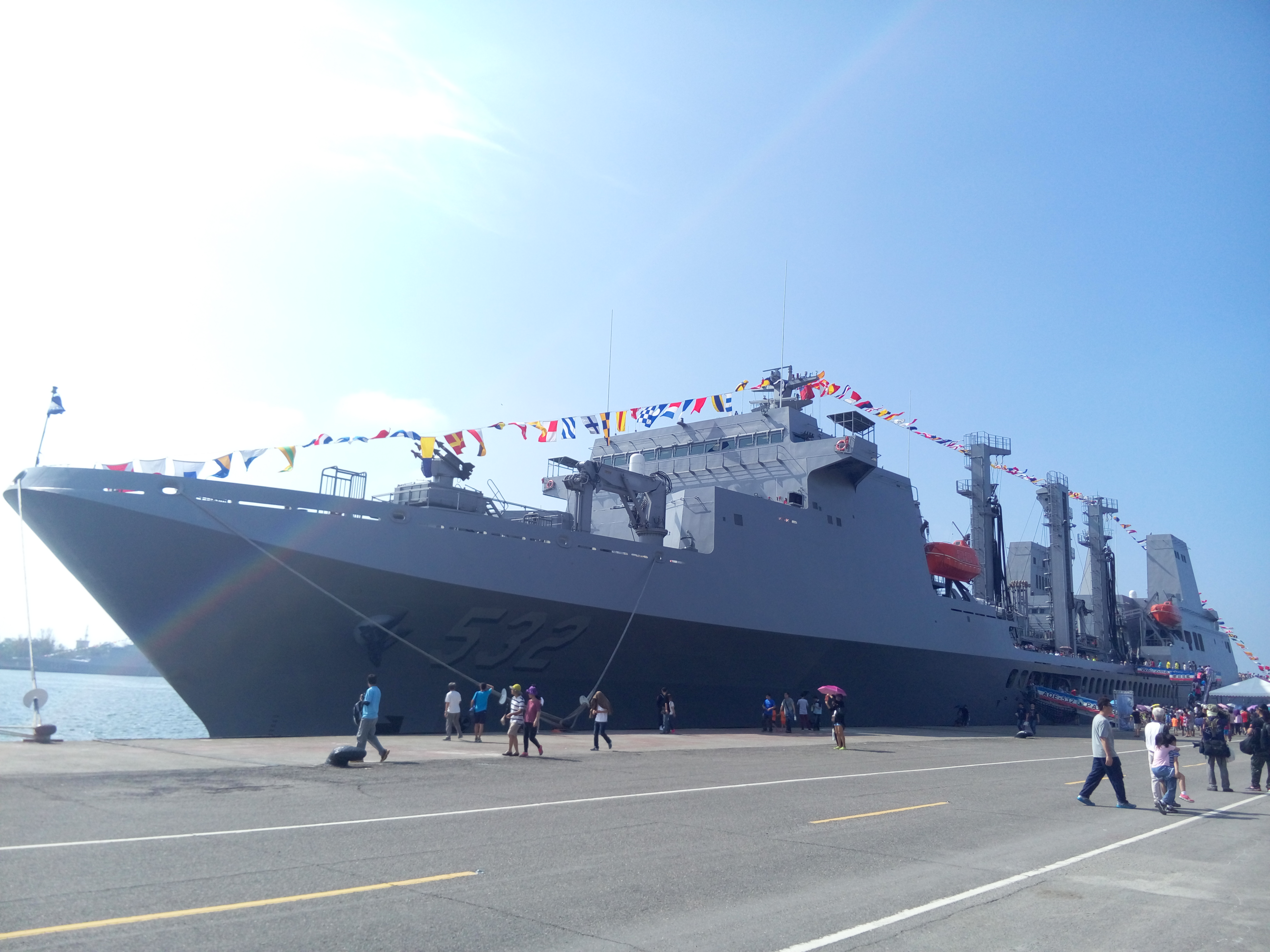
Pan Shi Fast Combat Support Ship (AOE-532)

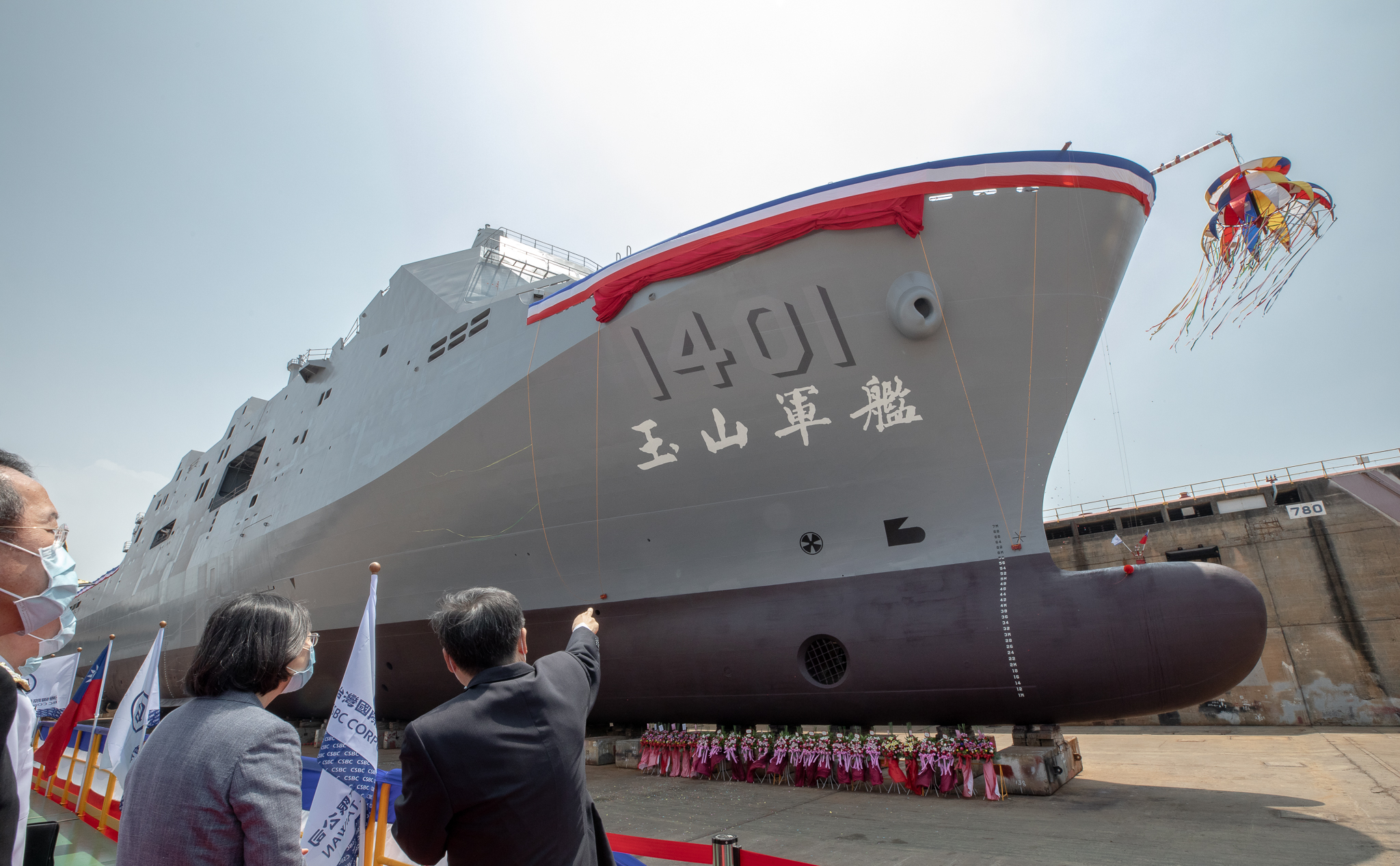
Yushan landing platform dock (LPD-1401)

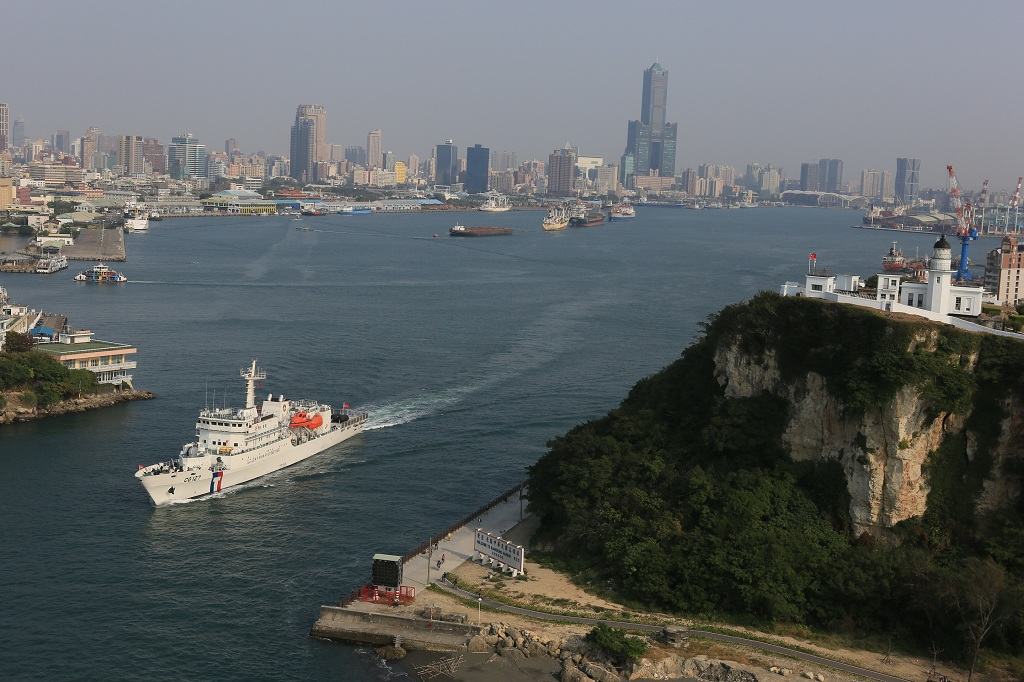
127 Xinbei, a 2000-ton patrol vessel built for Coast Guard Administration

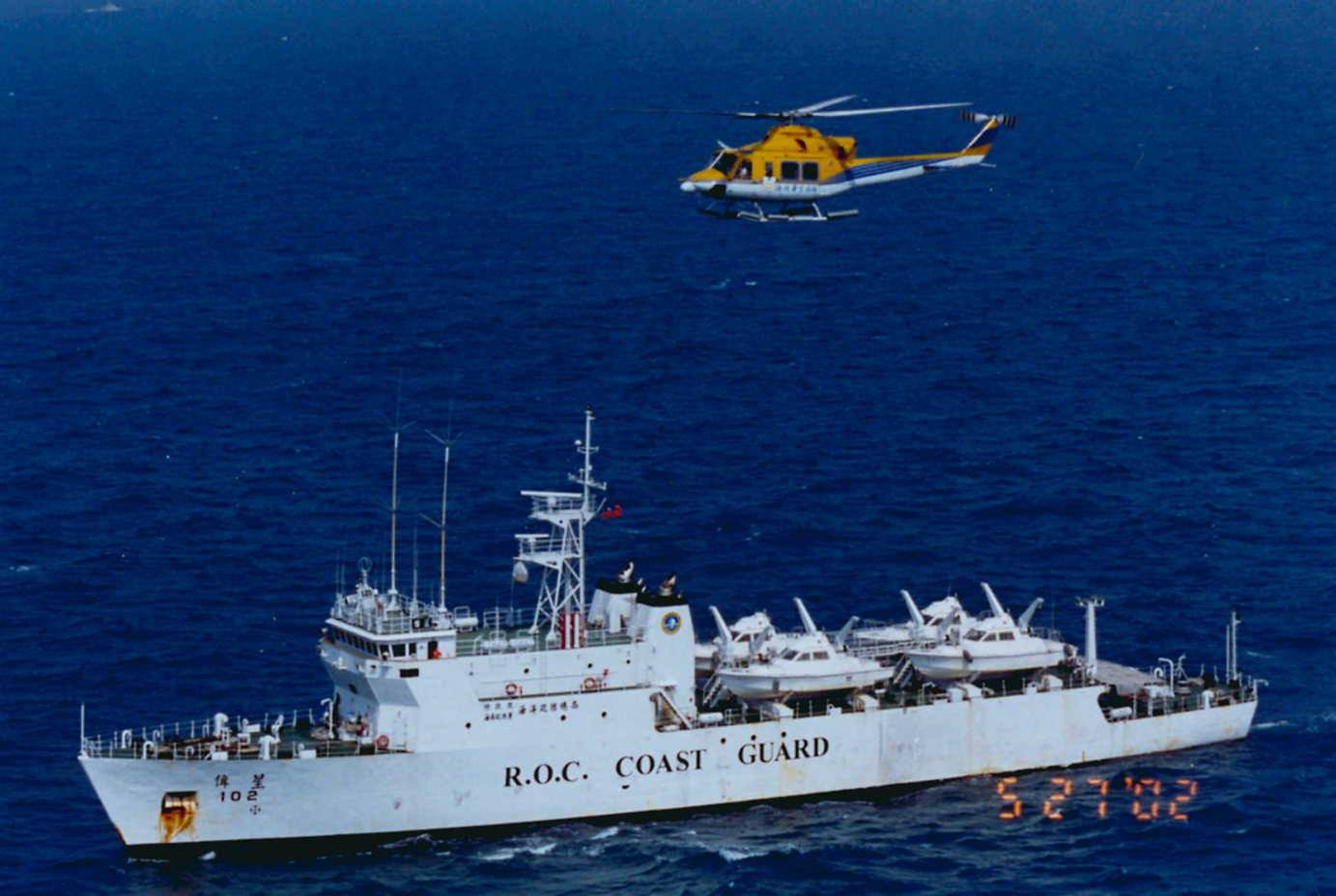
102 Wei Hsung, a 1,800-ton patrol vessel built for the Coast Guard Administration in 1992

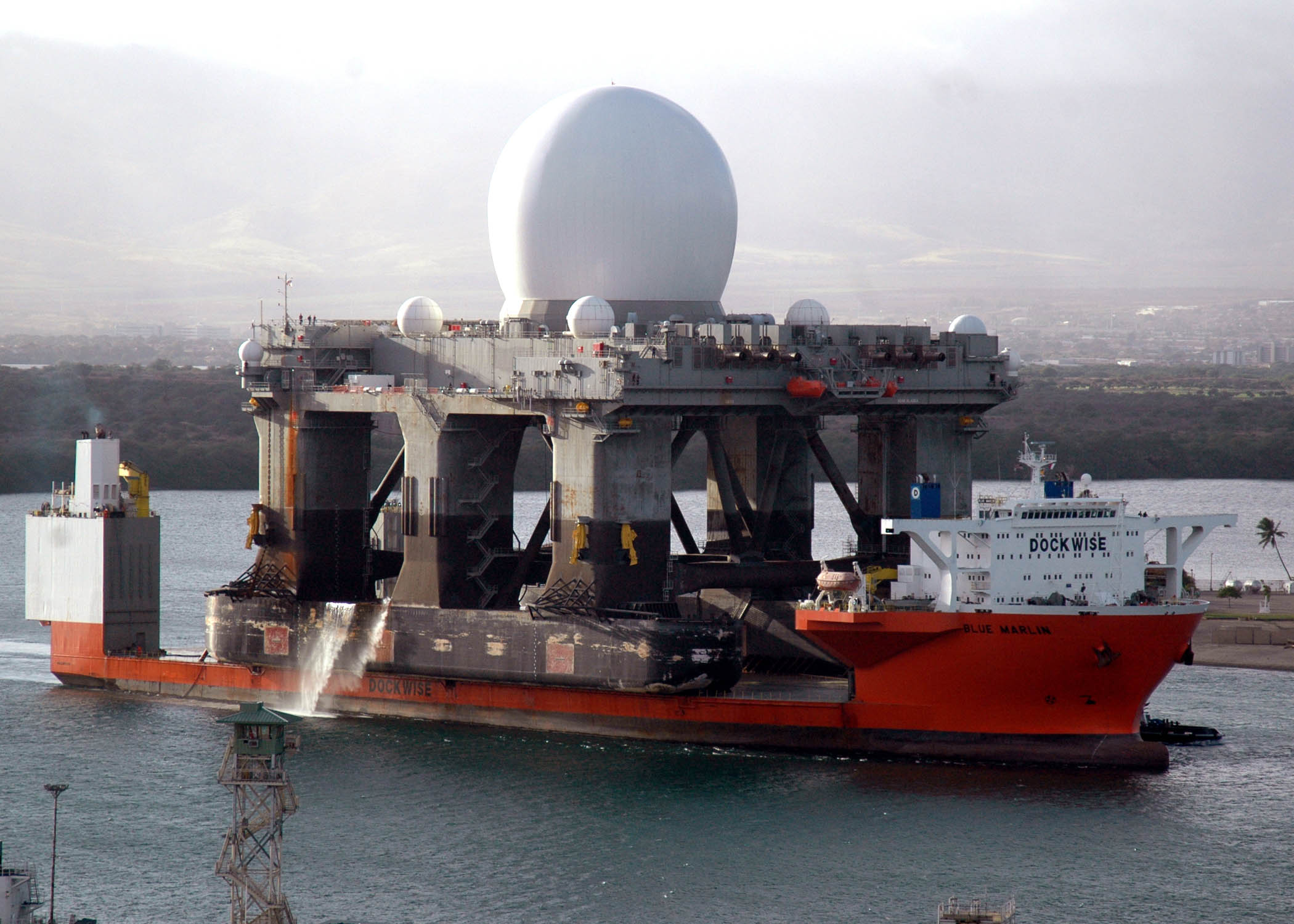
Sea-Based X-Band Radar enters Pearl Harbor on 9 January 2006 on its way to Adak Island, Alaska, transported by MV Blue Marlin

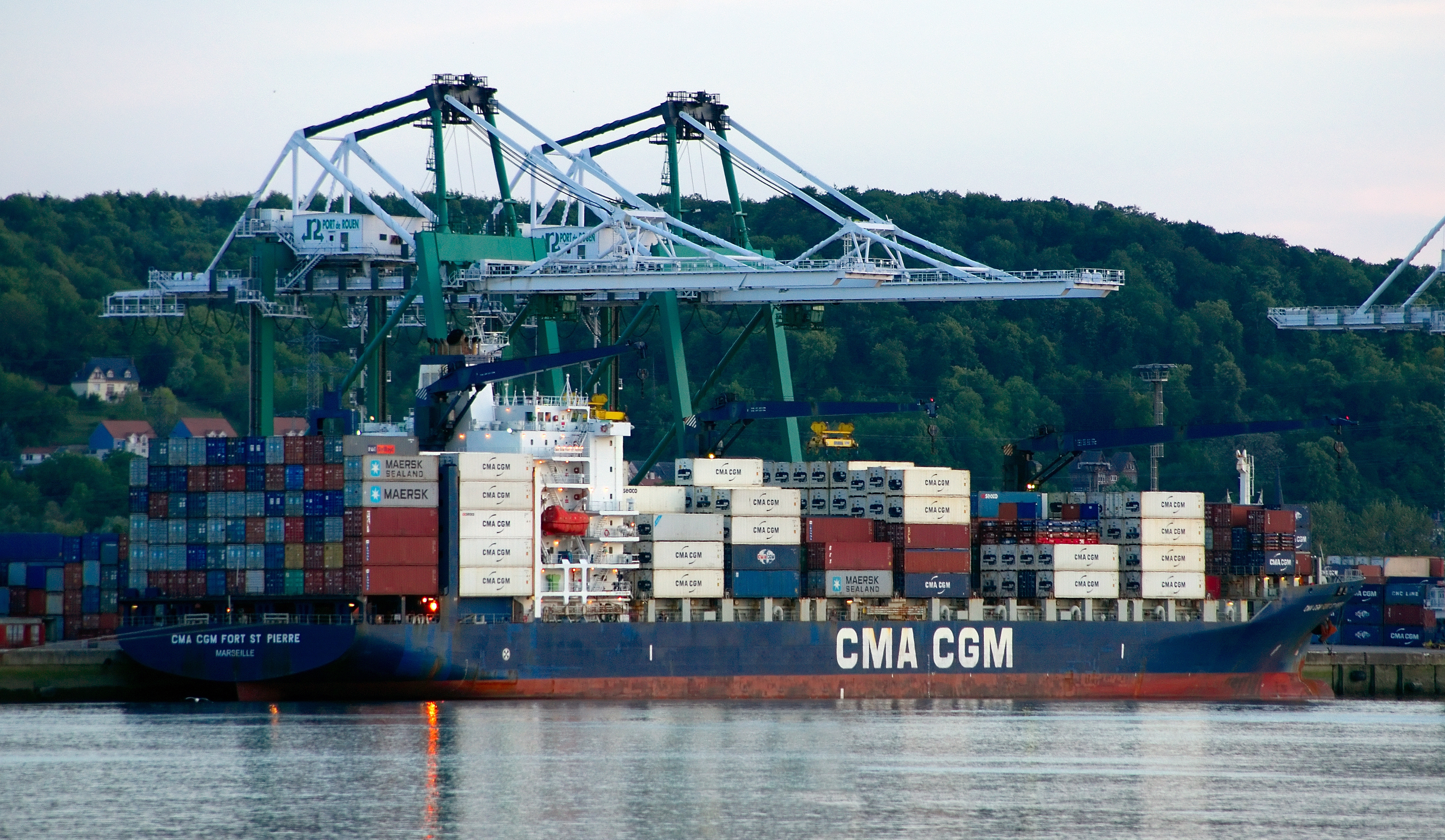
CMA CGM Fort St Pierre, launched 2003

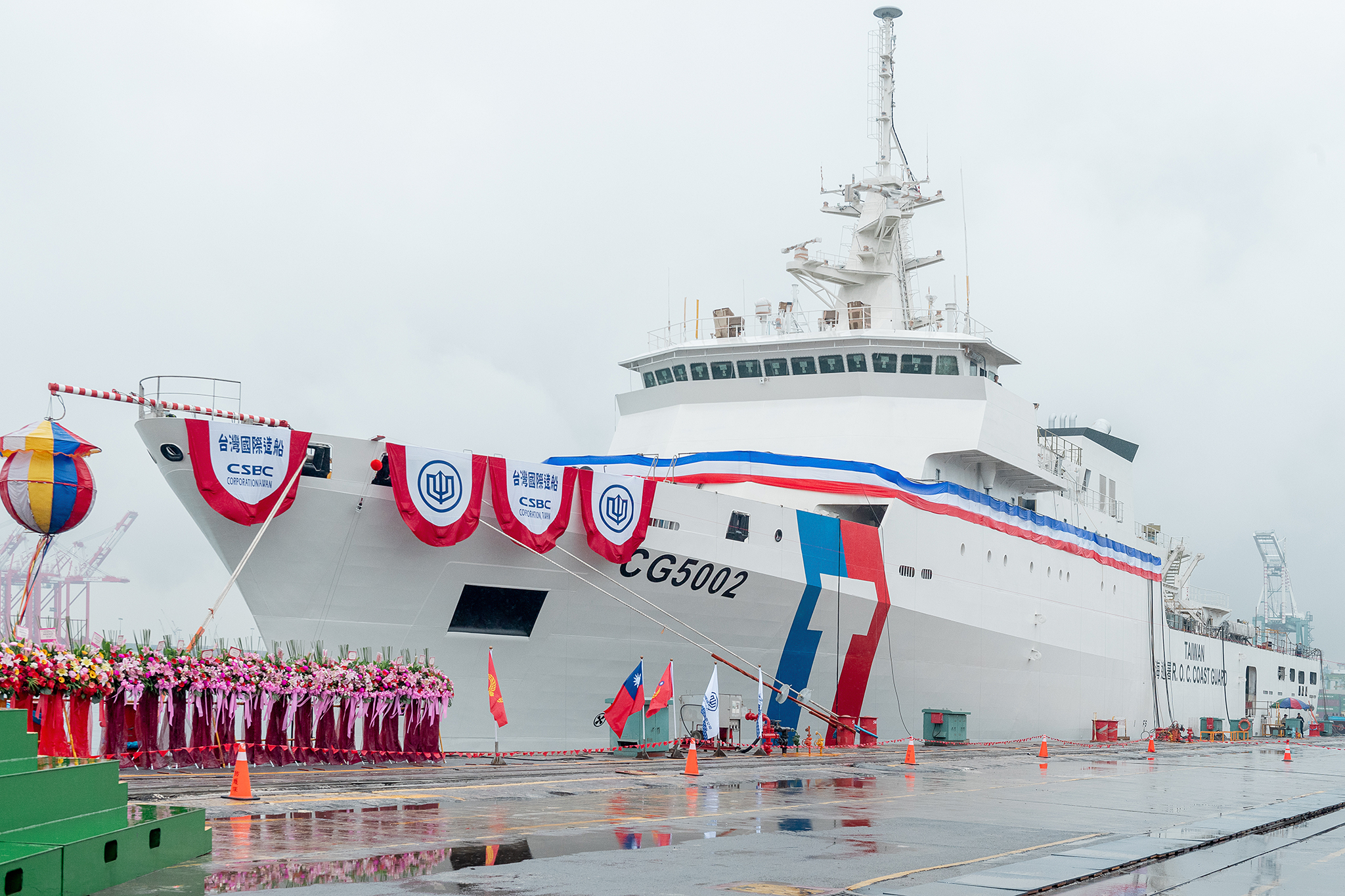
Chiayi-class offshore patrol vessel

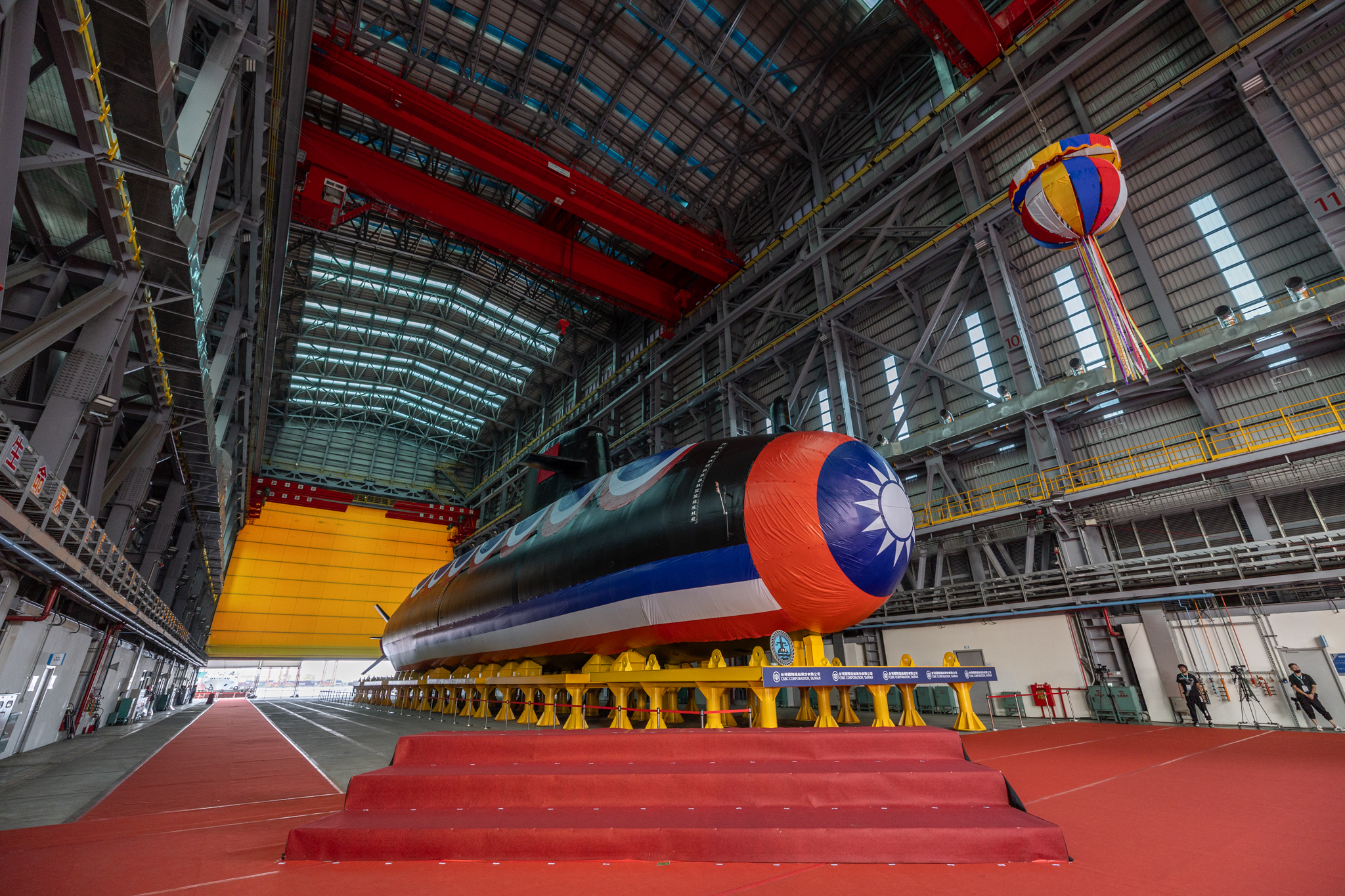
Hai Kun-class submarine

== Popular culture ==
CSBC and one of its ships is featured in episode two of the National Geographic Channel’s Superstructures: Engineering Marvels.

== See also ==
- List of companies of Taiwan
- Maritime industries of Taiwan
- Defense industry of Taiwan
- Jong Shyn Shipbuilding Company
- Lungteh Shipbuilding
