= MV Blue Marlin =

Semi-submersible heavy-lift ship

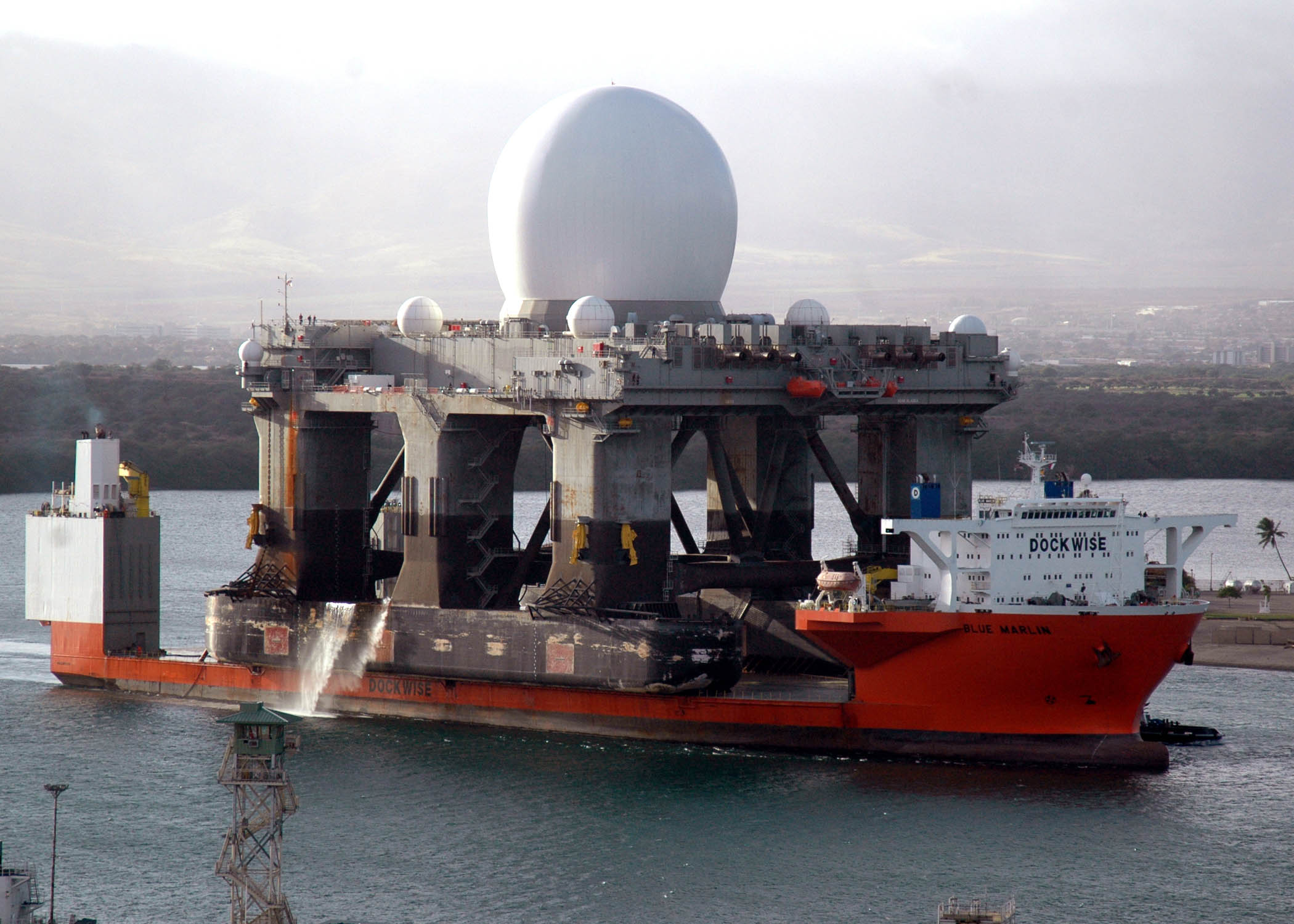
- Blue Marlin carrying the Sea-Based X-Band Radar

History
- Name: Blue Marlin
- Owner: Dockwise
- Operator: Dockwise
- Port of registry: Panama (2000–2003); Curaçao (2003–2017); Malta (2017–present)
- Builder: CSBC Corporation, Kaohsiung, Taiwan
- Laid down: 8 April 1999
- Launched: 23 December 1999
- Completed: 25 April 2000
- Identification: ABS class no: Call sign: 9HA4605; DNV ID: 20651; IMO number: 9186338; MMSI no.: 248314000
- Status: In service

General characteristics
- Class & type: A1 General Cargo Carrier E0 DK(+) PWDK TMON
- Tonnage: 51,821 GT; 15,547 NT; 76,061 DWT
- Length: 224.8 m (737 ft 6 in)
- Beam: 63.1 m (207 ft 0 in)
- Draught: 13.3 m (43 ft 8 in)
- Depth: 13.3 m (44 ft)
- Decks: 11,227 m^{2} (120,850 sq ft)
- Propulsion: MAN B&W 9S90ME-C8 producing 12,640 kW (16,950 hp); 2,000 kW (2,700 hp) bow thruster
- Speed: 14.5 knots (26.9 km/h; 16.7 mph) cruising
- Range: 25,000 nautical miles (46,000 km; 29,000 mi)
- Crew: 55 people

Blue Marlin and her sister ship Black Marlin compose the Marlin class of semisubmersible heavy-lift ships operated by Dockwise of the Netherlands. Designed to transport very large, semisubmersible drilling rigs above the transport ship's deck, she is equipped with 38 cabins to accommodate 60 people, a workout room, sauna and swimming facilities, and a secure citadel for protection against pirate attacks.

== History ==
Blue Marlin and her sister ship were owned by Offshore Heavy Transport of Oslo, Norway, from their construction, in April 2000 and November 1999, respectively, until 6 July 2001, when they were purchased by Dockwise. The United States Navy hired Blue Marlin from Offshore Heavy Transport to move the destroyer USS Cole back to the United States after the warship was damaged by Al-Qaeda suicide bombers while anchored in the port of Aden, Yemen. During the latter part of 2003, work done on Blue Marlin boosted her capacity and added two retractable propulsors to improve maneuverability. The ship re-entered service in January 2004. Following these improvements, Blue Marlin delivered the oil platform Thunder Horse PDQ, weighing 60,000 tons, to Corpus Christi, Texas, for completion.

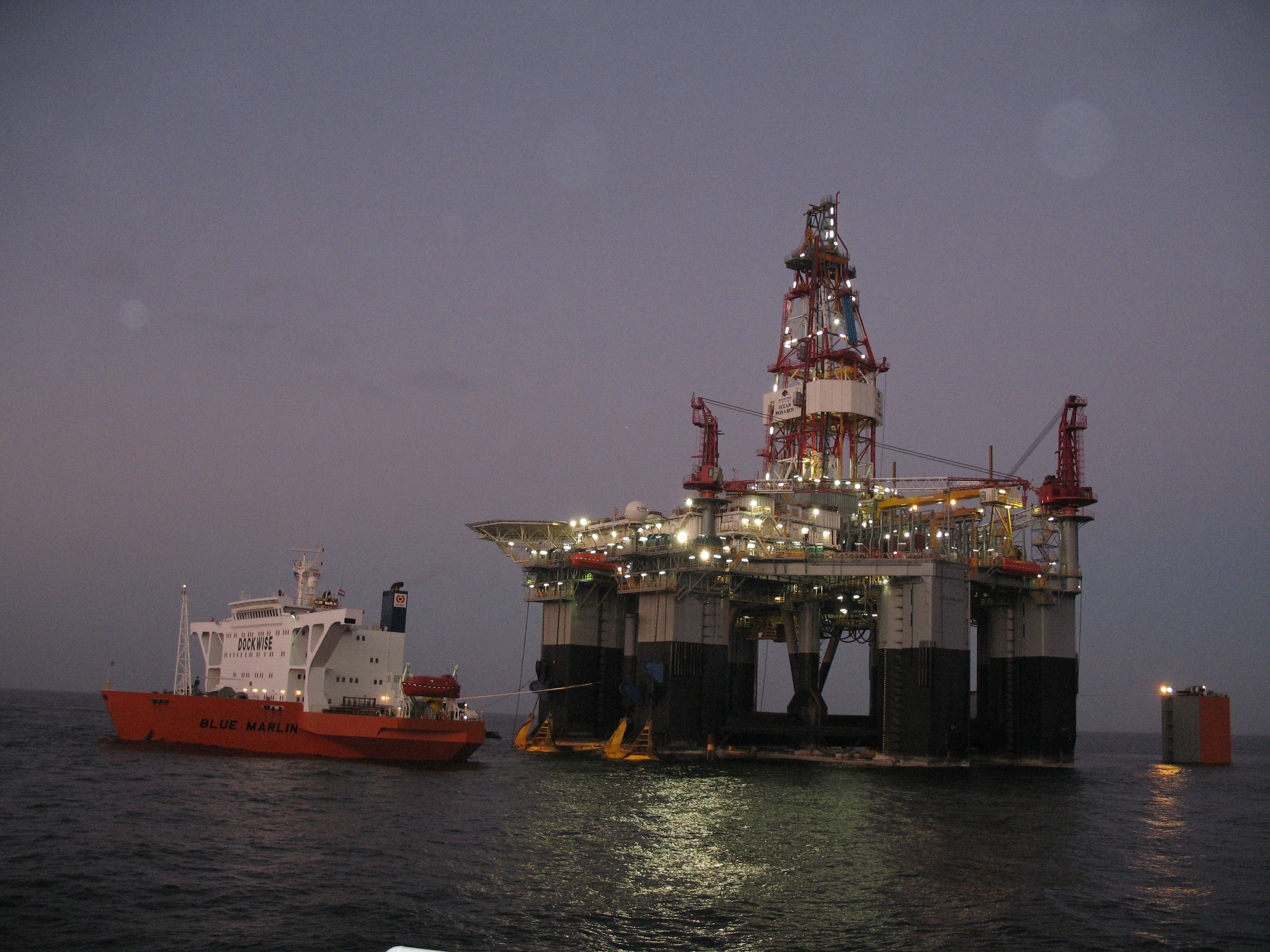
Blue Marlin preparing to offload Ocean Monarch

In July 2005 Blue Marlin moved the gas refinery Snøhvit from its construction site in Cádiz to Hammerfest, an 11-day trip. This transport was filmed for the TV show Extreme Engineering on the Discovery Channel, and also the TV show Mega Movers on the History Channel.

In November 2005, Blue Marlin left Corpus Christi to move the massive sea-based X-band Radar to Adak, Alaska, via the southern tip of South America and Pearl Harbor, Hawaii. It arrived at Pearl Harbor on 9 January 2006, having travelled 15,000 miles. In January 2007, Blue Marlin was employed to move two jackup rigs,Rowan Gorilla VI and the GlobalSantaFe Galaxy II, from Halifax Harbour to the North Sea.

On 16 June 2012, the ship arrived in Ferrol harbour in preparation for transporting the incomplete amphibious warship HMAS Canberra to Melbourne. The Australian ship was lifted onto Blue Marlin on 4 August 2012 and was scheduled to sail on 12 August, bound for BAE Systems Australia's Williamstown Dockyard. The ship passed the Port Phillip Heads and arrived in Melbourne on 17 October 2012.

On 5 May 2019, Blue Marlin was briefly hijacked off the coast of Equatorial Guinea. The crew took shelter in the ship's citadel, while pirates shot up the bridge in frustration. The pirates fled before the arrival of the Equatorial Guinean frigate Wele Nzas and Spanish patrol boat Serviola.

=== Post-2004 ===
- Max sailing draft: 10 m (33 ft)
- Max draft submerged: 29.3 m (96 ft)
- Water above deck submerged
  - aft 16 m (52 ft)
  - forward 12 m (39 ft)
- Propulsor output: 4,500 kW (6,035 hp) each
- Conversion yard: Hyundai Mipo Dockyard, Ulsan, South Korea

== See also ==
- BOKA Vanguard
- Mighty Servant 1
- Mighty Servant 2
- Mighty Servant 3
