= Dockwise =

Dutch marine transport company

Dockwise Group
- Company type: Subsidiary
- Industry: Transport
- Founded: 1993
- Headquarters: Breda, The Netherlands
- Area served: Global
- Key people: CEO: Peter Berdowski
- Services: Heavy marine transport
- Revenue: $399 Million
- Parent: Royal Boskalis B.V.
- Subsidiaries: Dockwise B.V. Offshore Kinematics, Inc.
- Website: boskalis.com/about-us/dockwise.html

Dockwise was a Netherlands-based holding company in the marine transport industry. It was acquired by Boskalis in 2013 and was merged into the Boskalis brand name in 2018.

== History ==
Dockwise was formed in September 1993 by the merger of two complementary companies, Wijsmuller Transport (a division of Heerema) and Dock Express Shipping (a division of Royal Vopak), becoming the world's largest seagoing heavy-transport shipping company. The combined company operated from a new headquarters in Meer (Hoogstraten), Belgium. Wijsmuller brought a fleet of seven semisubmersible vessels (Mighty Servant 1, Mighty Servant 2, Mighty Servant 3, and Super Servant 3, 4, 5, and 6) and four dock-type vessels (Dock Express 10, 11, 12, and 20).

In 2001, Offshore Heavy Transport ASA joined the company, adding two heavy-transport vessels, MV Black Marlin and MV Blue Marlin.

In November 2010, to serve the emerging market for ultralarge transports, such as its Dockwise's Type 0 heavy lift vessel, it appointed Hyundai Heavy Industries (HHI) of Korea as its shipbuilding yard. HHI was scheduled to deliver the vessel during the last quarter of 2012. Type O was renamed the Dockwise Vanguard.

In 2013, Dockwise was acquired by Royal Boskalis BV, which provides services in dredging, inland infrastructure, offshore energy, towage, and salvage.

=== Dockwise Shipping BV ===
Dockwise is an oil and gas service company, providing logistical management of large and heavy structures. Key services are heavy marine transport, offshore transport, and installation and onshore industrial projects. The company transports various heavy marine structures, such as large production and drilling platforms weighing up to 85,000 tons. The company headquarters is in Papendrecht, the Netherlands.

=== Dockwise fleet ===
- Dockwise White Marlin
- Dockwise Vanguard
- Blue Marlin
- Black Marlin
- Mighty Servant 1
- Mighty Servant 2
- Mighty Servant 3
- Transshelf
- Transporter
- Target
- Treasure
- Talisman
- Trustee
- Triumph
- Swan
- Swift
- Teal
- Tern
