= Oshima Shipbuilding =

Japanese shipbuilder

Ōshima Shipbuilding Co., Ltd.
- Company type: Private company limited by shares
- Industry: Shipbuilding
- Founded: February 7, 1973
- Headquarters: Oshima, Saikai, Nagasaki, Japan
- Key people: President Sho Minami
- Products: Bulk carriers
- Revenue: 61,900,000,000 Yen (Fiscal 2003)
- Number of employees: 975 permanent, 660 subcontracted
- Website: https://en.osy.co.jp/

Oshima Shipbuilding Co., Ltd. is a privately held Japanese shipbuilding company. The company was founded on February 7, 1973, and began operations in June 1974. It is a joint venture between Sumitomo Corporation, Sumitomo Heavy Industries, and the Daizo Corporation.

== Overviews ==
The company's main offices and shipyard are located in Oshima, on Oshima island, Saikai City, Nagasaki Prefecture, close to the entrance to Sasebo bay. Because of the shipyard presence, Oshima is nicknamed "the town of shipbuilding', although the island has many natural features.

== History ==
Oshima launched its first ship in 1975. The disruptions in the oil industry of the 1970s caused the company difficulties. Between 1975 and 1979 Oshima reduced its workforce from 1,800 to 785. In response, the company repositioned itself to specialize in building handymax and panamax bulk carriers.

The company has built 400 bulk carriers and delivers about 25 new ships annually to a worldwide client base. As of March 2018, the company has annual revenues of 116,000,000,000 Yen and a staff of 1344 full-time employees. An additional 660 workers work for Oshima on a subcontracting basis.

== Products ==
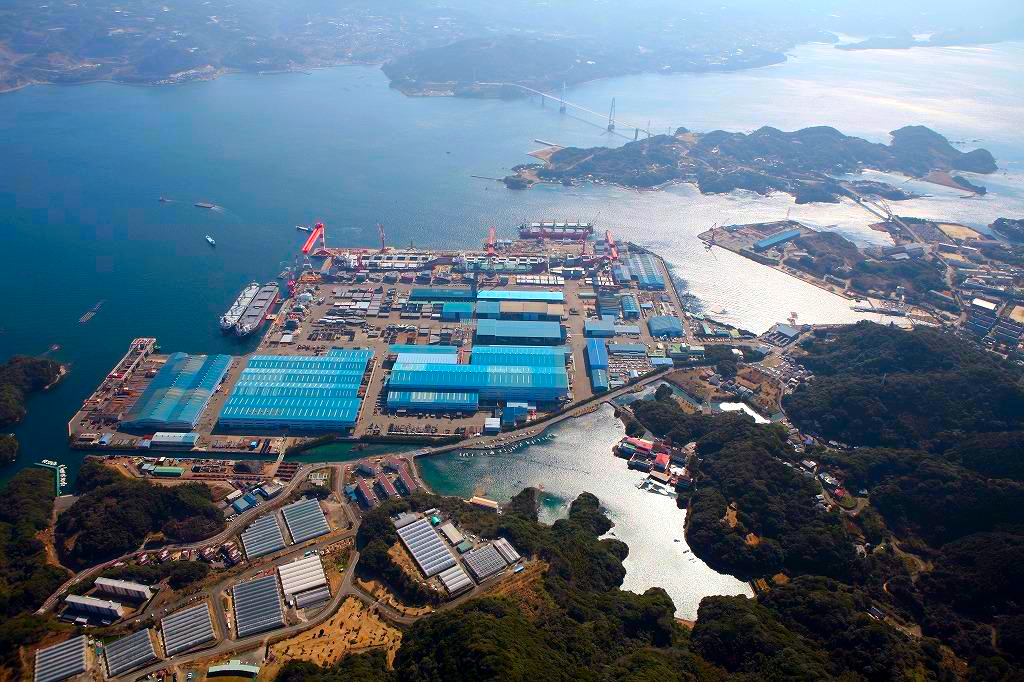
Oshima Shipyard of Oshima Shipbuilding

The company specializes in building bulk carriers. It has a number of standard designs, featuring bulkers with capacities from 33,000 tonnes deadweight (DWT) to 82,000 DWT in the handysize, handymax, and panamax size classes. The company also has a line of specialized coal carriers with capacities from 86,000 DWT to 106,000 DWT. Some of the handymax-sized vessels have optional open and semi-open hatch configurations.

The company provides three hull options: single-hull, double-hull, and its own proprietary "Hy-Con" or hybrid hull configuration. Single hulls are available on the smallest and largest of the vessels. Double hulls are available on the smallest 33,000 DWT and all vessels from 52,000 DWT to 96,000 DWT. The Hy-Con configuration is available on ships in the 52,000 DWT to 82,000 DWT range.

The Hy-Con design was developed to increase safety and the efficiency of cargo handling on bulkers. This design starts as a standard single-hulled ship. Then, the forward and aft holds are built up to double-hull structures.

Oshima has built a number of other types of ships. The list includes self-unloading bulkers, wood-chip carriers, car carriers, oil tankers, and submersible heavy-lift vessels. The company has also built other large structures, including the Oshima Bridge and the Fukuoka Dome.
