= Semi-submersible =

Semi-submersible may refer to a self-propelled vessel, such as:

- Heavy-lift ship, which partially submerge to allow their cargo (another ship) to float into place for transport
- Narco-submarine, some of which remained partially on the surface
- Semi-submarine, which cannot fully submerge
- Semi-submersible naval vessel, which partially submerges to minimize being observed
- Semi-submersible platform, which is typically transported to a location where it is placed in service
- Oil platform, a large structure with facilities for well drilling to explore, extract, store, and process petroleum and natural gas, in deeper water (more than 1,500 metres (4,900 ft)), the semisubmersibles or drillships are maintained at the required drilling location using dynamic positioning.

== See also ==
- Submarine boat
- Submersible boat
