= Mighty Servant 1 =

Semisubmersible heavy-lift ship

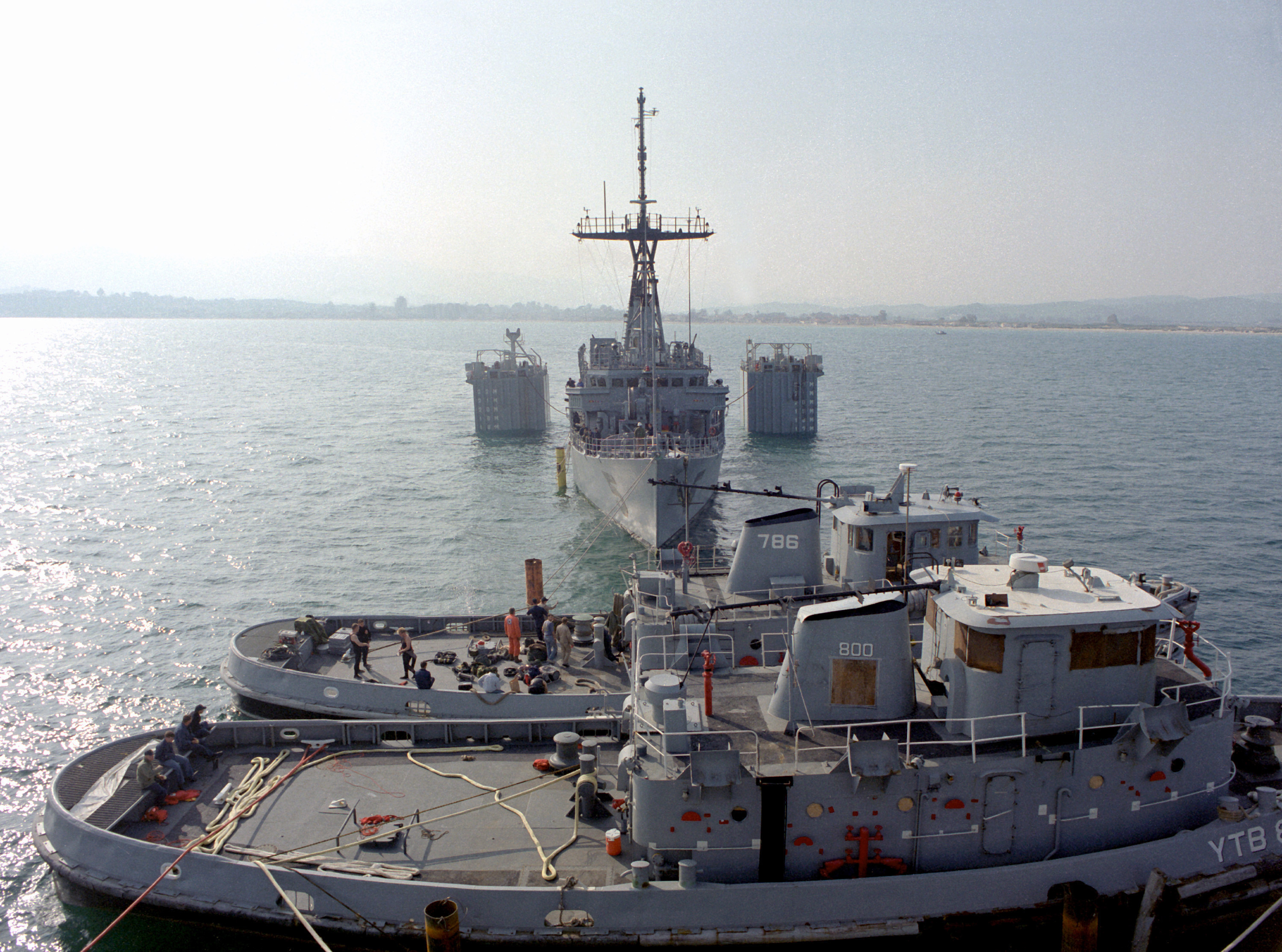
- After being positioned over the submerged deck of Mighty Servant I at Algeciras, Spain, 1 April 1992, Tonkawa (YTB-786) and Eufaula (YTB-800), and the mine countermeasures ship USS Guardian (MCM-5) wait to be raised out of the water.

History
- Owner: Dockwise
- Operator: Anglo-Eastern Limited
- Port of registry: Netherlands Antilles, Willemstad
- Builder: Oshima Shipbuilding; Ōshima, Japan
- Completed: 1983
- Identification: Call sign: PJVZ; DNV ID: 25696; IMO number: 8130875; MMSI number: 306812000
- Status: In service

General characteristics
- Class & type: Semi-Submersible Heavy Lift Cargo Ship
- Tonnage: 29,193 GT; 40,910 DWT
- Length: 190.03 m (623.5 ft)
- Beam: 50 m (160 ft)
- Draught: 4 m (13 ft) (minimum); 8.77 m (28.8 ft) (sailing); 26 m (85 ft) (submerged); 14 m (46 ft) (maximum cargo)
- Depth: 12 m (39 ft)
- Deck clearance: 50 m × 150 m (160 ft × 490 ft); load: 19 to 40 t (19 to 39 long tons; 21 to 44 short tons) per m^{2}
- Propulsion: 2 x 6,770 kW Wärtsilä 12V38A diesel generator sets, driving two c.p. propellers by four E-motors of 3,100 kW each. Two propellers can be driven by one engine. Two bow thrusters of 500 kW each.
- Speed: 14 kts (cruising); 15 knots (max.)
- Endurance: 59 days
- Capacity: 50 × 16 x 7.5 m (160 x 52 x 25 ft) deck; Hatch: 31 m × 14.6 m (102 ft × 48 ft)
- Crew: 20

Mighty Servant 1 is a 29,000-ton heavy-lift ship capable of carrying very large vessels and offshore platforms. Built for Dutch shipping firm Wijsmuller Transport, which merged in 1993 with Dock Express Shipping to become Breda-based offshore heavy lifting group, Dockwise Mighty Servant 1 carried structures such as oil rigs and floating drydocks. Originally 40 m (130 ft) wide, she was increased to 50 m (160 ft) in 1999 to lift the production rig Petrobras 36 or P-36.

== Service ==
Mighty Servant 1 can carry the heaviest semi-submersible drilling units, harsh-environment deep-water jack-up rigs and large floating production platforms like tension-leg platforms, oil platforms and spars with drafts of up to 14 m (46 ft).

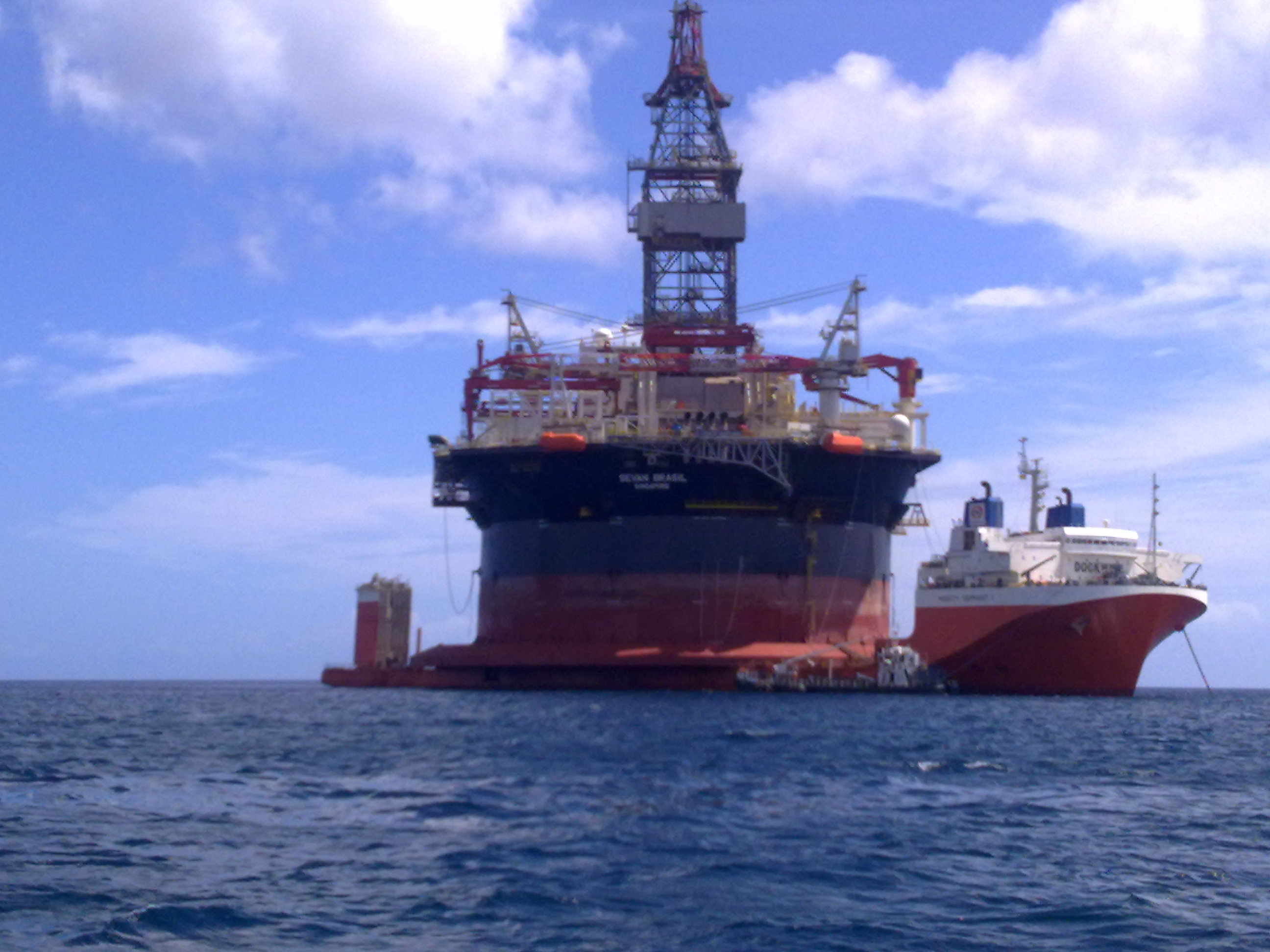
Mighty Servant 1 carrying driller Sevan Brasil off the coast of Port Louis, Mauritius

== See also ==
- Mighty Servant 2
- Mighty Servant 3
- MV Blue Marlin
- BOKA Vanguard
