= Tonkawa (disambiguation) =

The Tonkawa are a Native American tribe of Oklahoma and Texas.

Tonkawa may also refer to:

- Tonkawa, Oklahoma, a city in Oklahoma
- Tonkawa language, an extinct language formerly spoken by the Tonkawa people
- Tonkawa (YTB-786), a U.S. Navy tugboat
