= Eufaula (YTB-800) =

Tugboat of the United States Navy

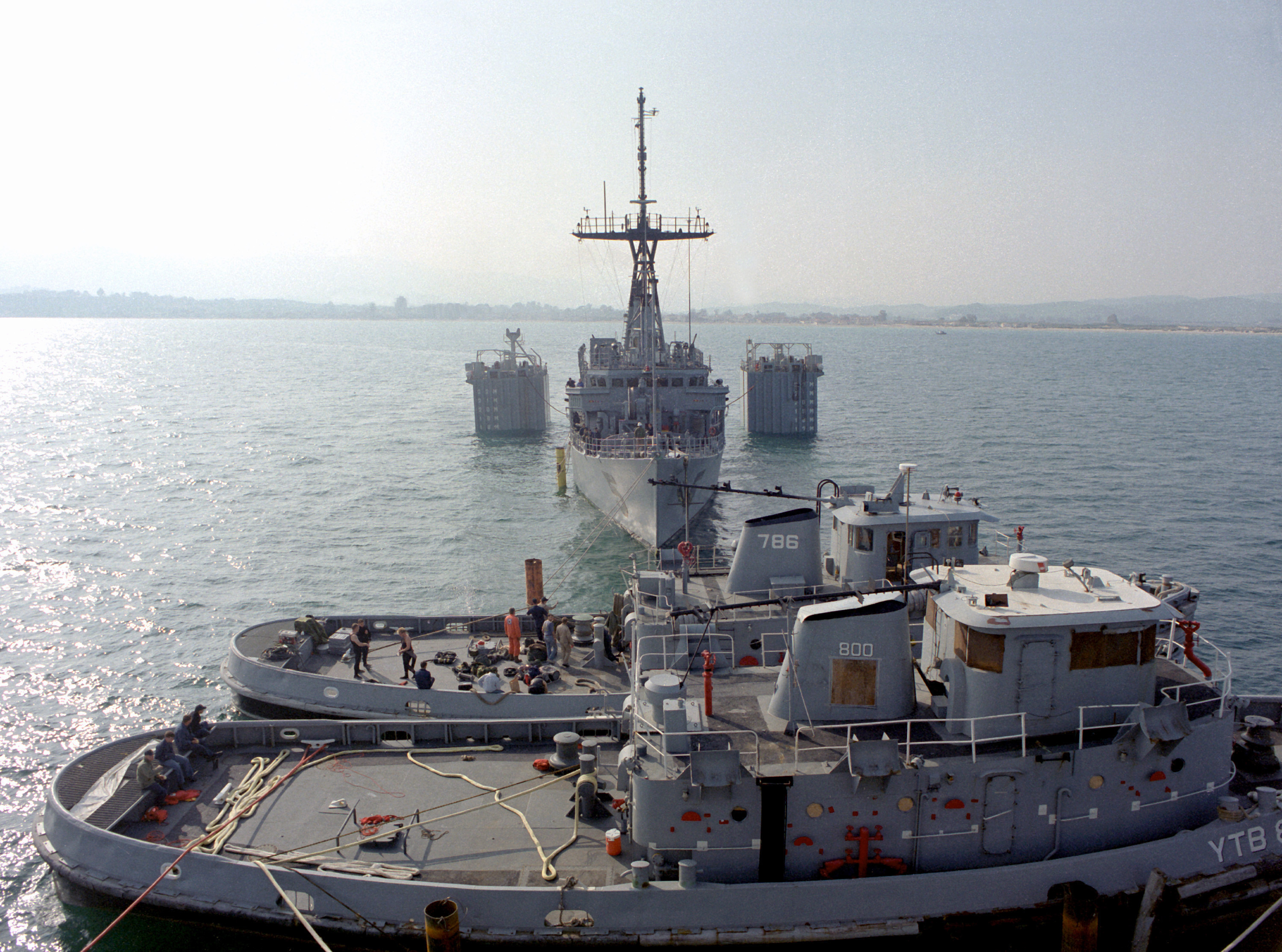
- After being positioned over the submerged deck of the Dutch heavy lift ship Mighty Servant 1 at Algeciras, Spain, 1 April 1992, Tonkawa (YTB-786) and Eufaula (YTB-800), and the mine countermeasures ship USS Guardian (MCM-5) wait to be raised out of the water.

History

United States
- Ordered: 2 May 1968
- Builder: Southern Shipbuilding Corp., Slidell, LA
- Laid down: 5 August 1968
- Launched: 22 February 1969
- Acquired: 3 July 1969
- Fate: Transfer to the Maritime Administration, 7 December 1992

General characteristics
- Class & type: Natick-class large harbor tug
- Displacement: 283 long tons (288 t) (light); 356 long tons (362 t) (full)
- Length: 109 ft (33 m)
- Beam: 31 ft (9.4 m)
- Draft: 14 ft (4.3 m)
- Speed: 12 knots (14 mph; 22 km/h)
- Complement: 12
- Armament: None

Eufaula (YTB-800) was a United States Navy Natick-class large harbor tug named after Eufaula, Alabama.

== Construction ==
The contract for Eufaula was awarded on 2 May 1968. She was laid down on 5 August 1968 at Slidell, Louisiana, by Southern Shipbuilding Corp and launched on 22 February 1969.

== Operational history ==
Eufaula served the 5th Naval District at Norfolk, Virginia and Naval Station Rota, Spain from 1969 - 1992.

On 7 December 1992, ex-Eufaula was transferred to the Maritime Administration National Defense Reserve Fleet.
