= Roncador Field =

Oil field in Campos Basin, Brazil

Roncador
- Location within Brazil
- Country: Brazil
- Location: Campos Basin
- Block: P-36
- Offshore/onshore: Offshore
- Coordinates: 21.977°S 39.781°W
- Operator: Petrobras

Field history
- Discovery: 1996
- Start of production: 1999
- Peak year: 2014

Production
- Current production of oil: 460,000 barrels per day (~2.3×10^{7} t/a)
- Estimated oil in place: 3,000 million barrels (~4.1×10^{8} t)
- Producing formations: Upper Cretaceous

The Roncador oil field is a large oil and gas field located in the Campos Basin, 125 km (78 mi) off the coast of Brazil, northeast of Rio de Janeiro. It covers an area of 111 km^{2} (43 mi^{2}) area and reaches depths between 1,500 and 1,900 metres (4,900 and 6,200 ft).

== History ==
The field was discovered in October 1996 and is located in the P-36 block. The operator, Petrobras, had been preparing for a deepwater technical challenge such as Roncador under its PROCAP (Petrobras Technological Development Program on Deep Water Production Systems) and PROCAP-2000 initiatives. The field is considered a major breakthrough, as it involves world's first drill pipe riser, subsea tree, and early production riser (EPR) rated for 2,000 metres (6,600 ft). Roncador has 53 production wells, 29 injection wells, and is anticipated to peak in 2014.

=== Oil platform accident ===
Until 2001, the field was developed using Petrobras 36 oil production platform. In the early hours of March 15, 2001 there were two unexplained explosions in the aft starboard column. At the time there were 175 people on the platform; 11 were killed. Following the explosions, the platform developed a 16° list, sufficient to allow down-flooding from the submerged fairlead boxes. Marine salvage teams tried over the weekend to save the platform by pumping nitrogen and compressed air into the tanks to expel the water, but they abandoned the rig after bad weather. The platform sank five days after the explosions (March 20), in 1,200 m (3,940 ft) of water with an estimated 1,500 tonnes (1,700 short tons) of crude oil remaining on board.

== Ownership ==
The field is fully owned and operated by Petrobras. It is estimated that Petrobras will spend nearly $2.2 billion on a project finance basis.

== Reservoir ==
Roncador has 3 billion barrels of proven recoverable oil reserves. Due to its size, the field was divided into four sections: Module 1 (28-31° API), Module 2 (18° API), Module 3 (22° API), and Module 4 (18° API), with subsequent division of the project into several phases.

== Production ==
Field development on Roncador was divided into several phases:

- The Module 1
  - Module1, Early Production Phase started producing in January 1999 from a well 1,853 metres (6,079 ft) through FPSO Seillean. This phase was set to produce early in order to create revenue for the project to cover the huge costs for development of the whole field. Production during this phase was 20,000 bbl/d.
  - The Module 1, Phase One consisted of several subsea wells connected to semisubmersible production facility P-36 which started producing in May 2000, which sank on March 15, 2001, due to two explosions leading to human casualties. At that time, P-36 was considered to be world's biggest semisubmersible which produced 84,000 bbl/d and 1.3 MMcm/d of gas.
  - Module 1A, Phase One was started after the P-36 sunk on Module 1 to get the field producing as soon as possible. Eight production wells were connected to FPSO Brasil vessel moored in 1,290 metres (4,230 ft) of water. In December 2002, the field started producing again .
  - Module 1A, Phase Two included fabrication and installation of P-52 platform connected to 18 subsea production wells and 11 water injection wells. The $500 million engineering, procurement, construction and installation which included laying 221 km (137 mi) of flexible risers and flowlines, 161 km (100 mi) of umbilicals and 83 km (52 mi) of jumpers for the tie-back was contracted to Technip and Subsea 7. Engineering and construction of P-52 platform which was built for a total cost of $1 billion was contracted to a consortium of Technip and Keppel FELS in December 2003. The platform became operational in November 2007 with 20,000 bbl/d peaking to 180,000 in second part of 2008. The peak gas production from this phase was 3.2 MMcm/d.
- Module 2 development consists of 17 long horizontal wells 11 of which are production wells and 6 - for water injection. Considered one of the largest in the world and weighing 66,224 tonnes, the P-54 FPSO vessel was assigned for production from Module 2. P-54 was converted from VLCC Barao De Maua large carrier at a $628 million contract with Jurong Shipyard, a subsidiary of SembCorp Marine and a $25 million subcontract with Aker Solutions which provided the processing equipment for the vessel. It became operational on December 11, 2007. This phase of the project boost the overall production from the field to 460,000 bbl/d.
- Module 3 development consists of 11 add-on and 7 water injection wells and includes the P-55 with production capacity of 180,000 bbl/d and gas compression capacity of 6 MMcm/d. The platform is expected to start production in 2011.
- Module 4 will have the capacity to produce 180,000 bbl/d and compress 6 MMcm/d of natural gas.

== See also ==
- Petrobras 36 Oil Platform
- Campos Basin
- Santos Basin
