= Tonkawa (YTB-786) =

Tugboat of the United States Navy

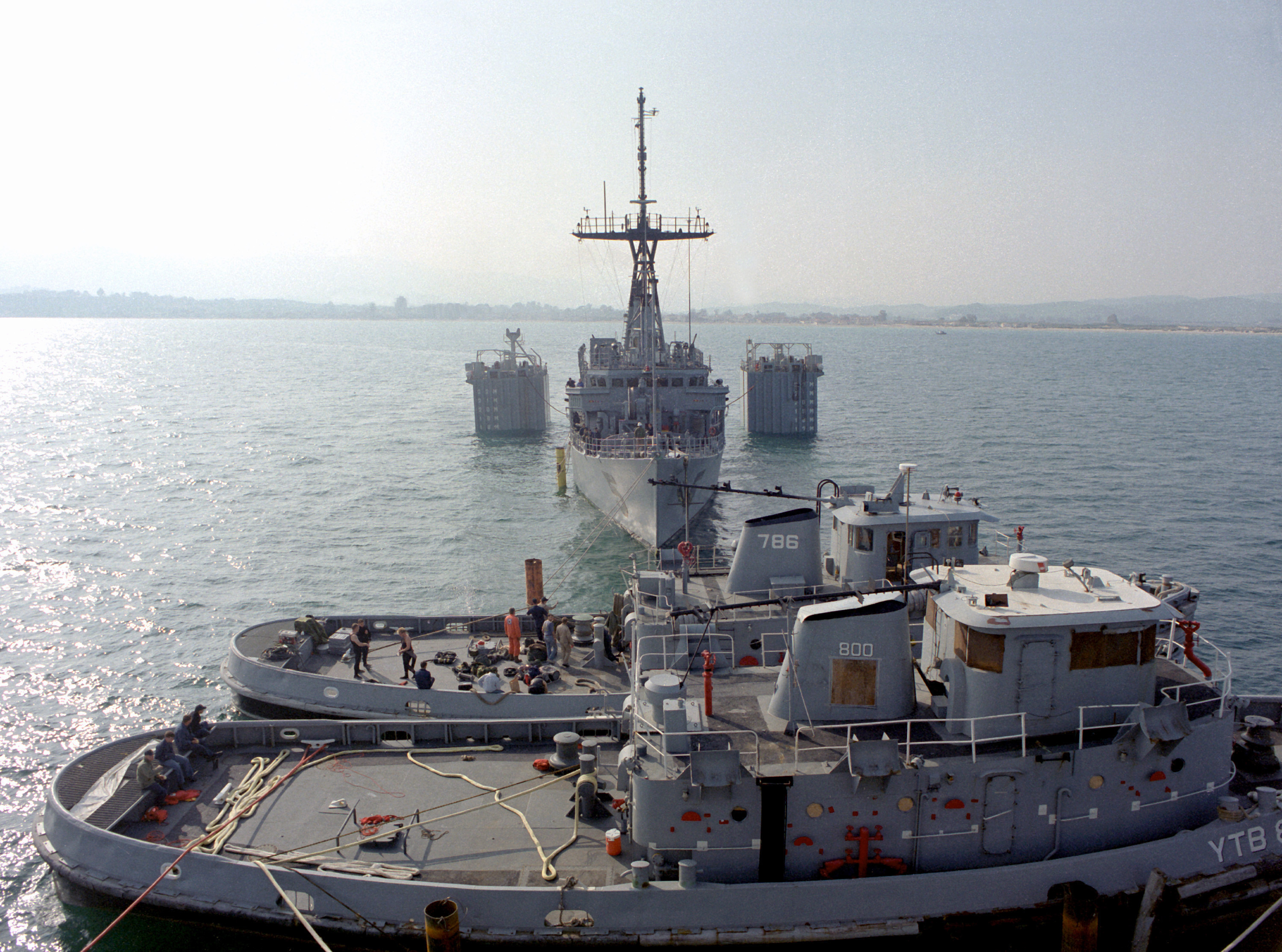
- After being positioned over the submerged deck of the Dutch heavy lift ship Mighty Servant 1 at Algeciras, Spain, 1 April 1992, Tonkawa (YTB-786) and Eufaula (YTB-800), and the mine countermeasures ship USS Guardian (MCM-5) wait to be raised out of the water.

History

United States
- Ordered: 14 January 1965
- Builder: Marinette Marine, Marinette, Wisconsin
- Laid down: 22 December 1965
- Launched: 15 March 1966
- Acquired: 19 May 1966
- Stricken: 1992
- Identification: IMO number: 8990469; MMSI number: 366909510; Callsign: WDB5426
- Fate: Sold into commercial service

General characteristics
- Class & type: Natick-class large harbor tug
- Displacement: 283 long tons (288 t) (light); 356 long tons (362 t) (full)
- Length: 109 ft (33 m)
- Beam: 31 ft (9.4 m)
- Draft: 14 ft (4.3 m)
- Speed: 12 knots (14 mph; 22 km/h)
- Complement: 12
- Armament: None

Tonkawa (YTB-786) was a United States Navy Natick-class large harbor tug named for Tonkawa, Oklahoma.

== Construction ==
The contract for Tonkawa was awarded 31 January 1964. She was laid down on 22 December 1965 at Marinette, Wisconsin, by Marinette Marine and launched 15 March 1966.

== Operational history ==
Placed in service in June 1966, Tonkawa was assigned to duty at Atlantic Area Advanced Bases, including Naval Station Rota Spain, and provided tug and tow services for the Atlantic Fleet.

Stricken from the Navy Directory in 1992, she was sold 6 October 2000 through the General Services Administration (GSA) to McAllister Towing and renamed Margaret McAllister.
