= USS Patriot (MCM-7) =

Avenger-class mine countermeasures ship

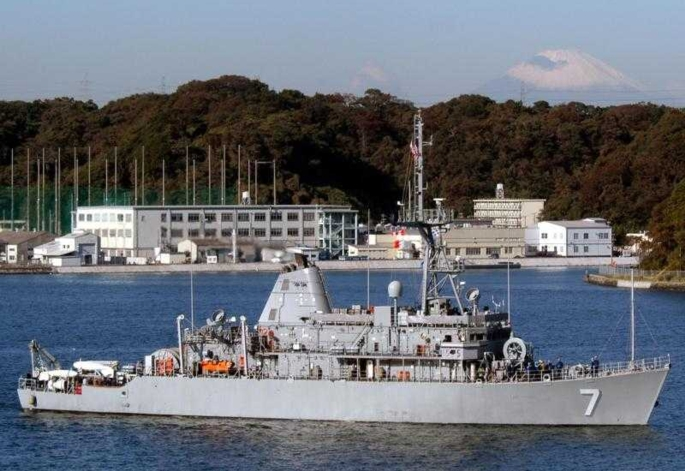
- USS Patriot (MCM-7)

History

United States
- Name: USS Patriot
- Builder: Marinette Marine, Marinette, Wisconsin,
- Laid down: 31 March 1987
- Launched: 15 May 1990
- Commissioned: 13 December 1991
- Home port: Sasebo, Japan
- Identification: MCM-7
- Motto: Latin: Audentes fortuna juvat; ("Fortune Favors the Brave")
- Status: in active service
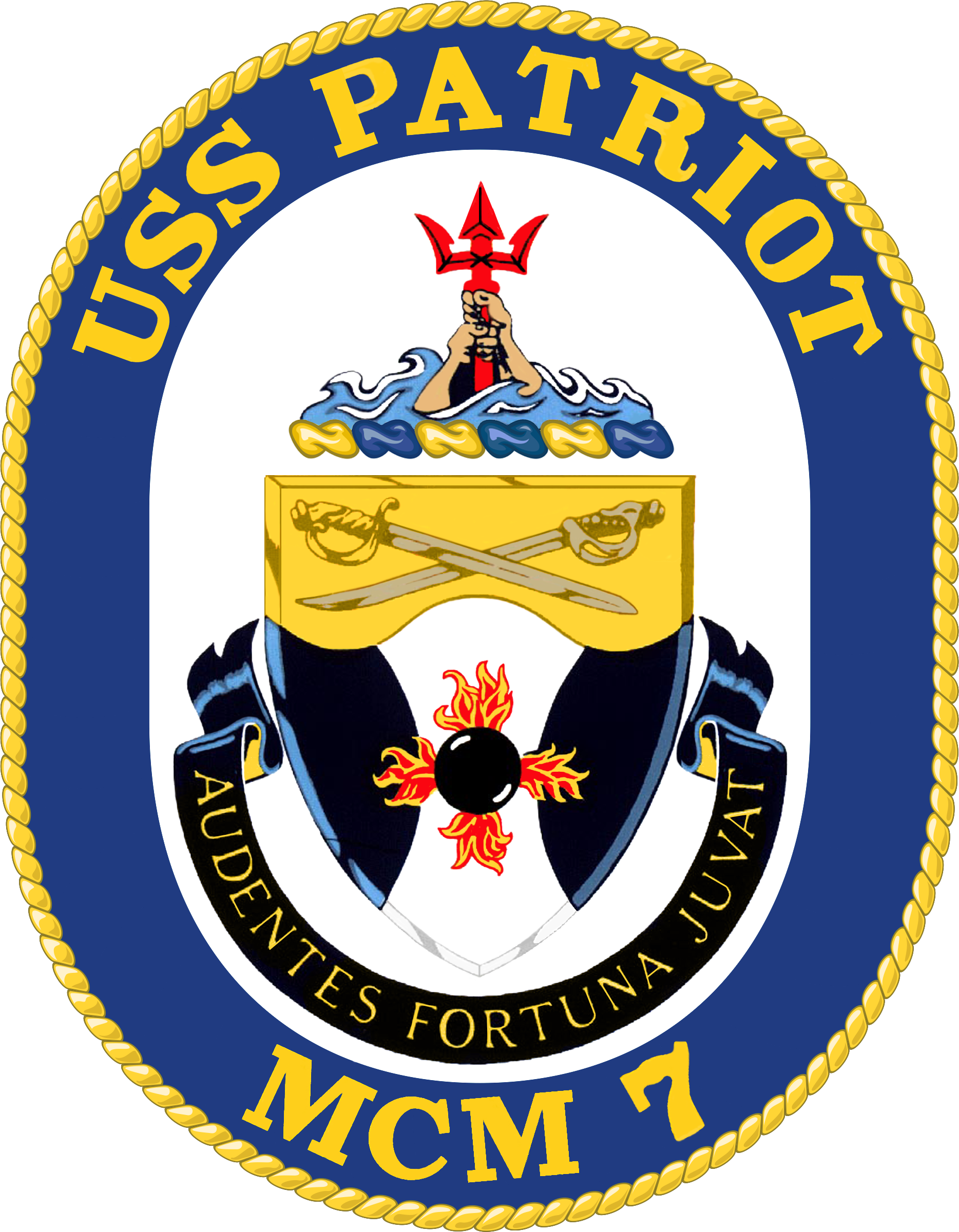
- Badge

General characteristics
- Class & type: Avenger-class mine countermeasures ship
- Displacement: 1,367 long tons (1,389 t)
- Length: 224 ft (68 m) o/a
- Beam: 39 ft (12 m)
- Draft: 13 ft (4.0 m)
- Propulsion: 4 × Isotta-Fraschini diesel engines; 2 × controllable/reversible pitch propellers; 2 × rudders; 2 × light-load electric motors
- Speed: 14 knots (26 km/h; 16 mph)
- Complement: 6 officers and 75 enlisted
- Sensors & processing systems: AN/SLQ-48 (V) Mine Neutralization System; AN/SQL-37 (V) 3 Magnetic/Acoustic Influence Minesweeping Gear; Oropesa type 0 size 1 Mechanical Sweep Equipment; MDG 1701 Marconi Magnetometer Degaussing System
- Electronic warfare & decoys: AN/SSN-2 Precise Integrated Navigation System (PINS); AN/SQQ-32 Mine-hunting sonar; AN/SPS-55 Surface Radar; AN/WSN-2 Gyro Compass
- Armament: 2 × M2 Browning .50-cal machine guns; 2 × M60 7.62 mm machine guns; 2 × Mk 19 grenade launchers

USS Patriot (MCM-7) is an Avenger-class mine countermeasures ship of the United States Navy, and is the third Navy ship of that name. The hulls of the Avenger-class ships are constructed of wood with an external coat of fiberglass.

Patriot was laid down on 31 March 1987 by Marinette Marine in Marinette, Wisconsin; launched on 15 May 1990; and commissioned on 13 December 1991 in Charleston, South Carolina. Commander Michael J. O'Moore, a native of Brooklyn, New York, was the commissioning Commanding Officer. Patriot was originally homeported at NS Charleston until 1993, when she transferred to NS Ingleside, Texas.

== History ==
In 1994, Patriot was called to serve in the Pacific, and since then has served as one of four forward-deployed MCMs in 7th Fleet's Amphibious Ready Group. Patriot is operationally assigned to MCMDiv 11, CTF 76, ComSeventhFlt, CinCPacFlt, and USCinCPac. Her administrative chain of command is CoMCMDiv 11, CoMCMRon 1, CoMineWarCom (NAS Corpus Christi, TX) recently merged with Naval Anti-Submarine Warfare Command into NMAWC (Naval Mine and Anti-Submarine Warfare Command), and ComNavSurfLant. Although Patriot was permanently assigned to Sasebo, Japan, her crew served on a rotational basis from Ingleside, Texas. Each rotation lasted approximately 6 months. In 1996, the crew assignments were changed to permanent overseas assignments.

Patriot and her sister ship Guardian were scheduled for a port visit to Hong Kong in the first week of August 1997. As preparations were completed, the Navy hierarchy realized that it would be the first US Navy port visit to the island after the handover to Chinese control on 1 July 1997. Plans were quickly completed for USS Blue Ridge (LCC 19) to lead the port visit, and hold receptions for military and diplomatic dignitaries. Patriot and Guardian accompanied the flagship pierside.

In March 2003, the major event was TSTA3/FEP. This Tailored Ship's Training Availability (TSTA3)/ Final Exercise Problem (FEP) initially designed to be a training assist visit to assess readiness, was turned into a graded scenario to prove her battle readiness. This advanced stage of training is designed to improve ships operations and give Patriot an opportunity to prove she is ready to perform her primary and secondary missions with utmost efficiency and skill.

Patriot executed her deployment phase during the 2003 calendar year. Along with conducting MINEX, she participated in Exercise Foal Eagle 2003, a combined naval exercise with South Korea. Patriot successfully accomplished 100 percent mine-warfare tasking during the integrated exercise. Patriot conducted a WESTPAC Deployment during the months of May and June conducting port visits in Okinawa, Fukuoka, Japan, Busan, South Korea, Incheon, South Korea, and Kagoshima, Japan. Patriot also took part in the 50th Anniversary of the Korean War with a port visit to Busan, South Korea.

Patriot routinely participates in a combined Mine Warfare training exercises with the Japanese Maritime Self-Defense Force as part of an annual MINEX and EODEX. MINEX/EODEX is a joint mine countermeasures (MCM) exercise designed to foster US Navy and Japanese Maritime Self Defense Force (JMSDF) interoperability through the use of the MCM Triad, surface MCM (SMCM) air MCM (AMCM) and Explosive Ordnance disposal (EOD) teams.

In 2005, Patriot conducted a Selected Maintenance Availability during which the ship was refitted with the most recent equipment upgrades and shipboard alterations. The maintenance period allowed the ship to re-train personnel and in preparations for the ship's Basic Training Phase and Interdeployment Training Cycle.

On 16 February 2007, Patriot was awarded the 2006 Battle "E" award.

In late November 2007, Patriot and sister minesweeper USS Guardian (MCM-5) sought refueling and refuge from an approaching storm in Hong Kong's Victoria Harbour, but were denied entry without explanation by the People's Republic of China. Both ships were eventually refueled at sea and returned safely to their home ports in Japan.

In June 2011, six crew members were given nonjudicial punishment and recommended for discharge from the Navy. The discipline was the result of a hazing incident which took place during the preceding Memorial Day weekend.

== Awards ==
- Marjorie Sterrett Battleship Fund Award - (2010)
