= FPSO Noble Seillean =

Oil storage vessel

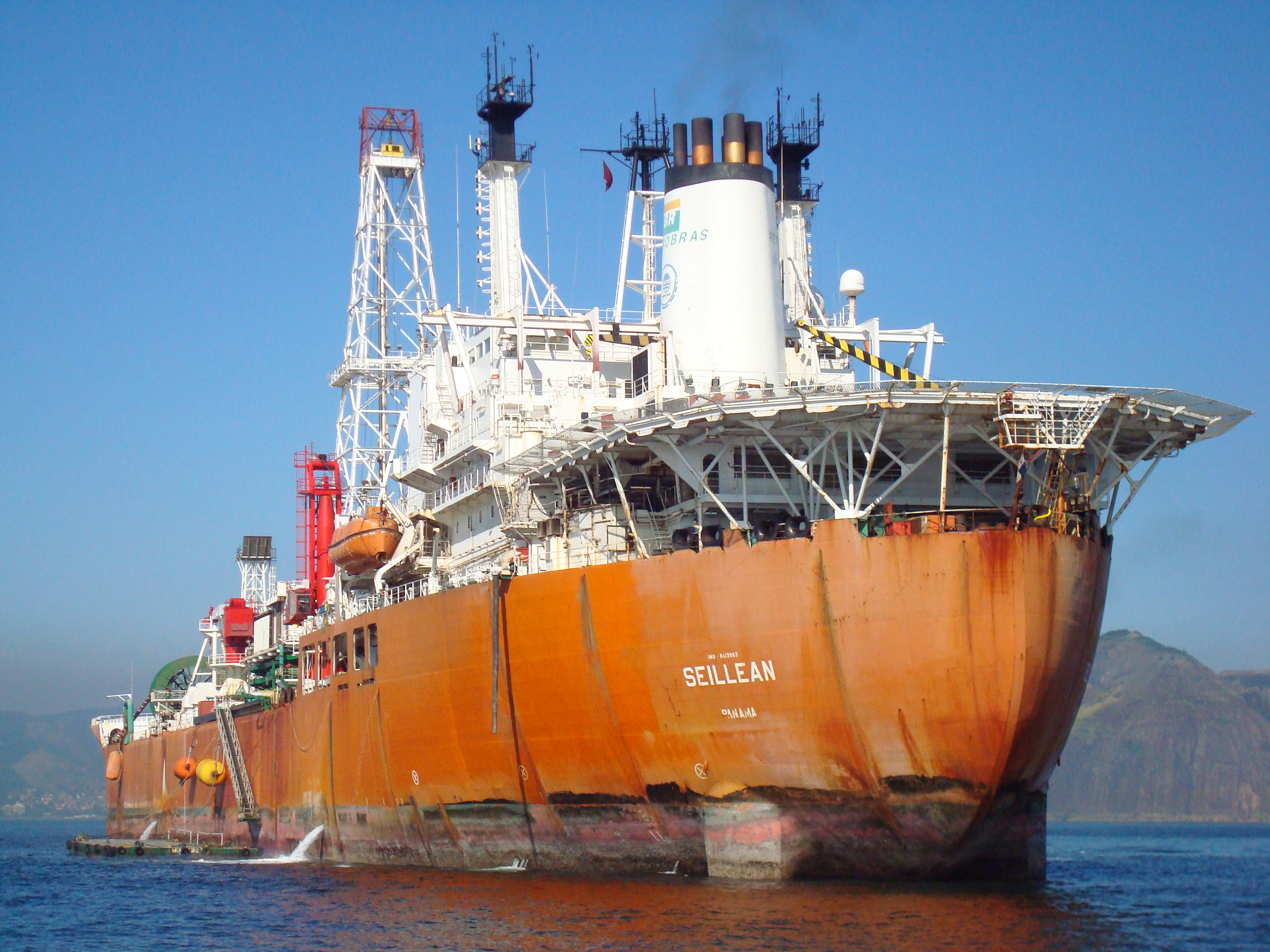
- Mighty Seillean FPSO

History
- Name: Noble Seillean
- Operator: Noble Corporation
- Port of registry: Liberia Monrovia
- Builder: Harland & Wolff
- Laid down: 18 September 1986
- Launched: 17 June 1988
- Acquired: 4 April 1990
- Out of service: 2015
- Identification: DNV ID: 31900; Call sign: A8XN2; IMO number: 8413863; MMSI number: 636014938
- Fate: Scrapped 26 September 2015

General characteristics
- Class & type: Lloyd's: 100A1 Oil Processing Tanker; DNV: 648 – Oil Production and Storage Unit
- Tonnage: 50,928 GT; 15,278 NT; 56,177 DWT
- Length: 249.7 m (819 ft)
- Beam: 37 m (121 ft)
- Draught: 11.54 m (37.9 ft)
- Depth: 19.8 m (65 ft)
- Installed power: 3 × MAN diesel engines x 4.2 MW; 3 × Ruston gas turbines x 3.3 MW
- Speed: 7.3 knots (13.5 km/h; 8.4 mph)
- Capacity: processing: 25,000 bbl/d (4,000 m^{3}/d); storage: 310,000 bbl (49,000 m^{3})
- Crew: 85

FPSO Noble Seillean was the first ever dynamically positioned floating oil production, storage and offloading vessel.

== Etymology ==
The name Seillean means "honeybee" in Gaelic.

== History ==
The vessel was designated as a single-well oil production ship (SWOPS) when constructed for BP by Harland & Wolff in 1986–1988. The vessel was designed to operate in the conditions encountered at a generic North Sea field well. Seillan would arrive onfield, connect to the wellhead, fill her tanks, disconnect, sail to port, discharge the oil, repeating this process every 20 days.

The process plant, flare and the riser including subsea connection were designed and procured by Matthew Hall Engineering, which also provided construction assistance and commissioning of the oil production facilities. The original specification for the vessel was as follows:

- Production capability – 15,000 barrels of oil per day, 10,000 barrels of produced water per day, 6 million standard cubic metres of gas per day
- Production train – 1 train, 2 stages, 1st stage separator pressure 17 barg
- Storage capacity – 318,000 barrels
- Living accommodation – 45 berths

Seillean was initial deployed in April 1990 to the Cyrus oilfield on Block 16/28 in the UK sector of the North Sea. Her second deployment in April 1992 served the Donan field, in 1993 BP divested of Seillean to Falcon Reading & Bates who continued the contract till well depletion in 1996.

Brazilian oil company Petrobras signed a four-year charter for Seillean to assess the potential of the Roncador field. Seillean was upgraded to an FPSO by fitting an offloading system, and arrived in Brazil in December 1998.

After acquisition of Reading & Bates by Transocean, the vessel was acquired by Frontier Drilling in 2002. She was moved to Jubarte field. In February 2006, the vessel started to operate in the Petrobras-operated Golfinho Field in the Espirito Santo Basin off Brazil. In 2007, Seillean was moved to Pipa 2 oilfield.

In April 2010 following the Deepwater Horizon oil spill at the Macondo Prospect, Noble Corporation contracted Seillean. After demobilising from Brazil, she arrived at Macondo by June 2010 to perform oil collection and processing from the relief wells.

On 28th June 2010 Noble initiated a merger with Frontier Drilling, acquiring Seillean. In December 2010 she was renamed Noble Seillean and her registration flag was changed from Panama to Liberia.

Seillean was sent for scrapping to Alang, India, on 26 September 2015.

== Description ==
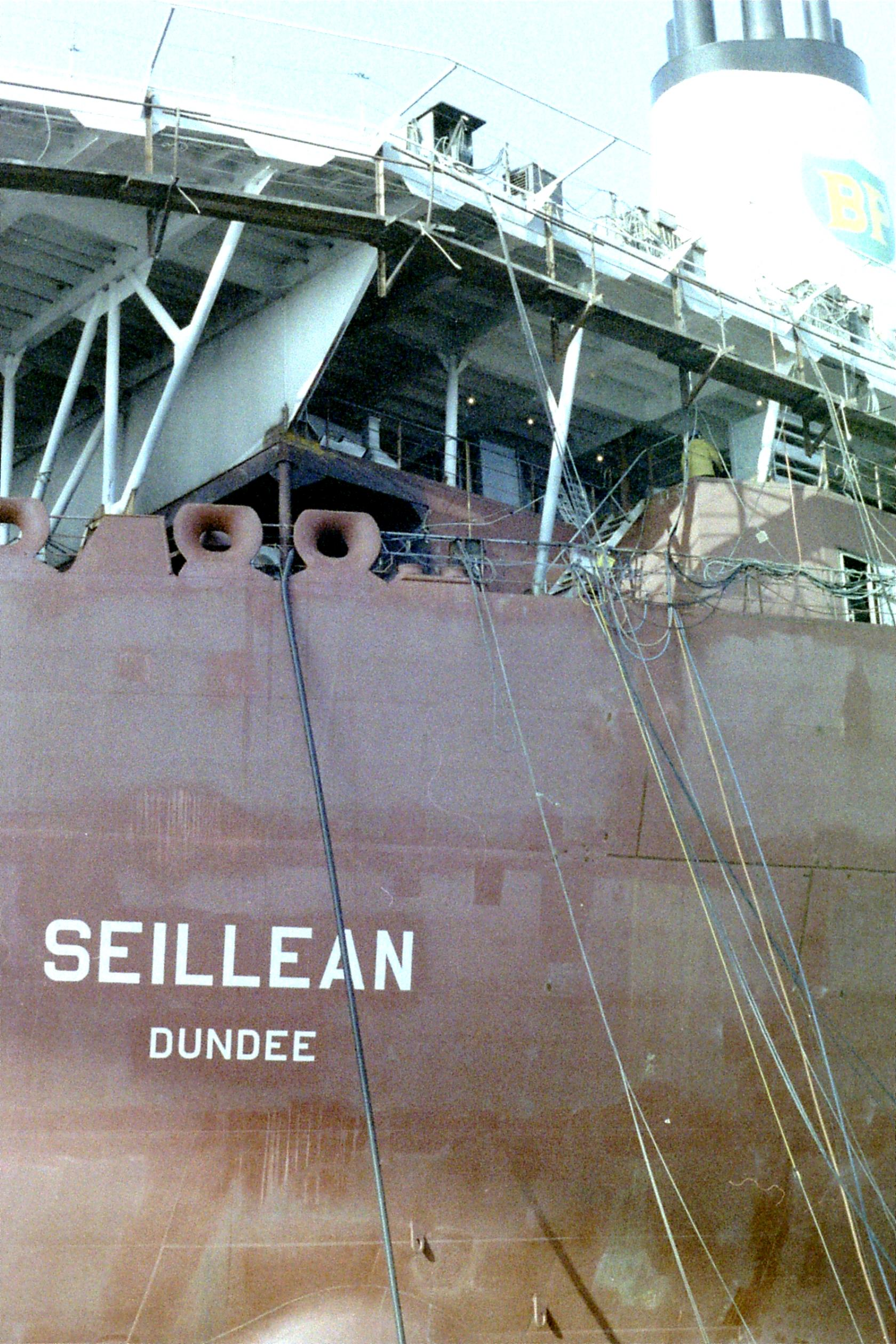
Seillean under construction Belfast 1986

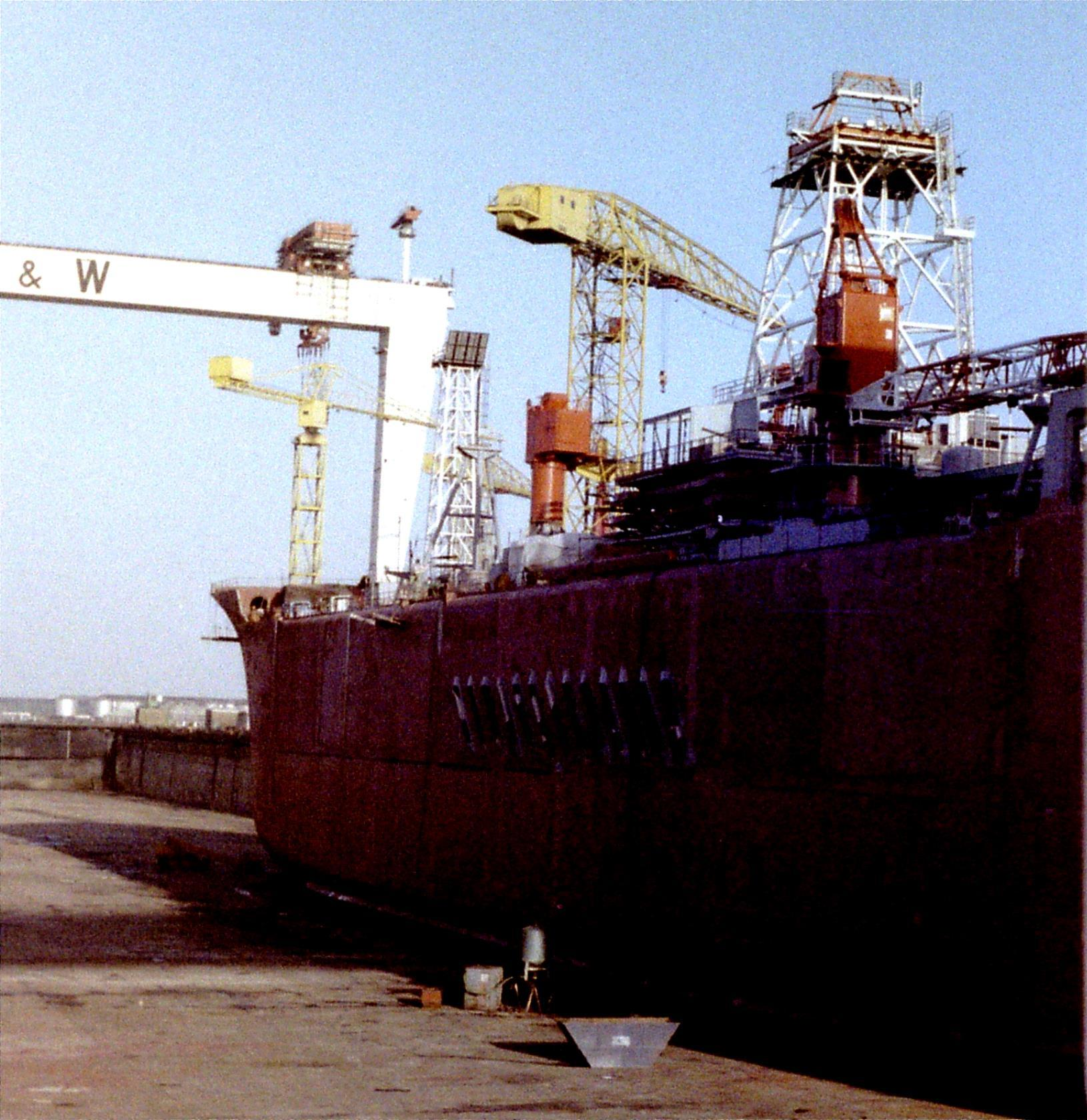
Seillean under construction Dry Dock Belfast 1986

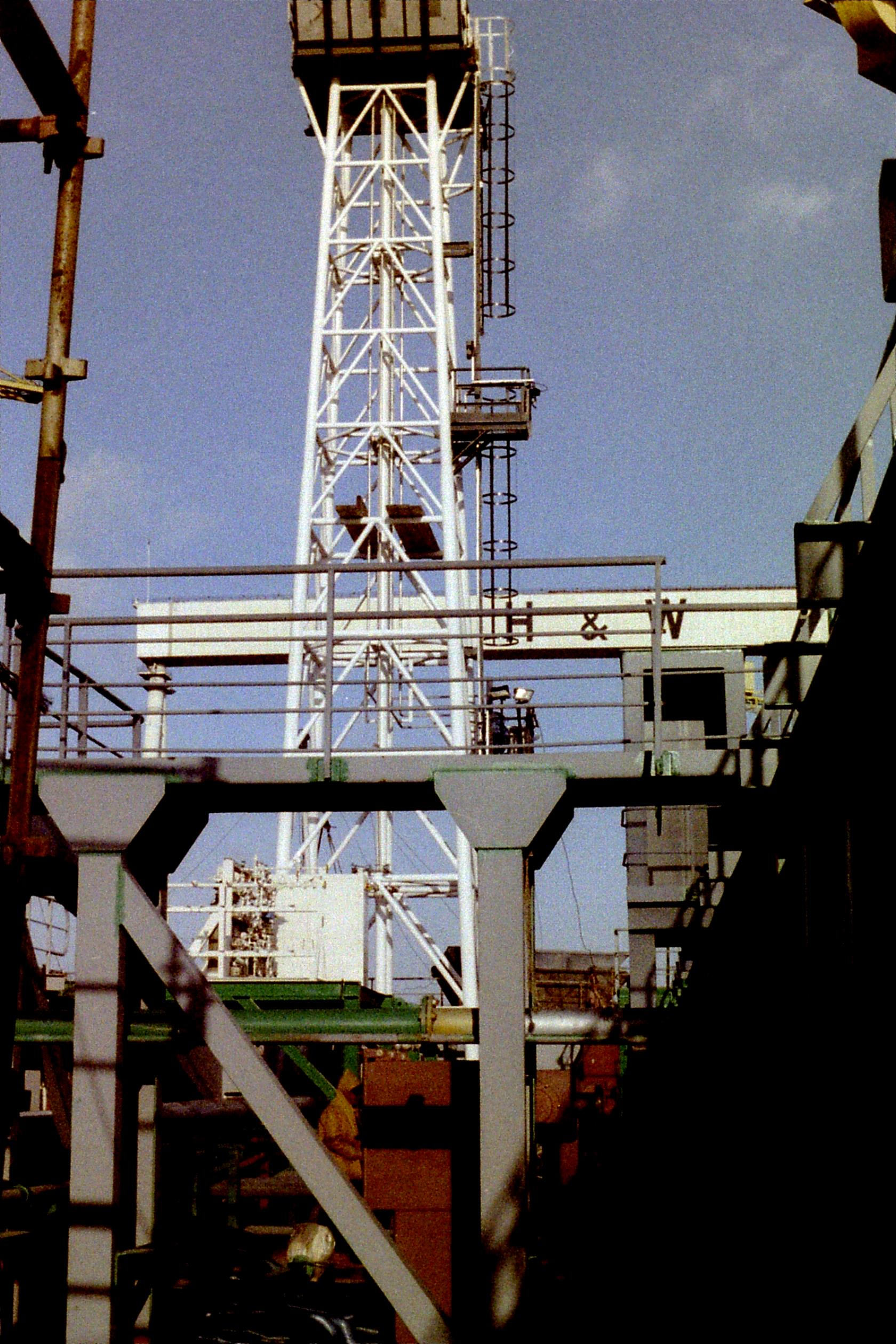
Seillean Flare tower 1986

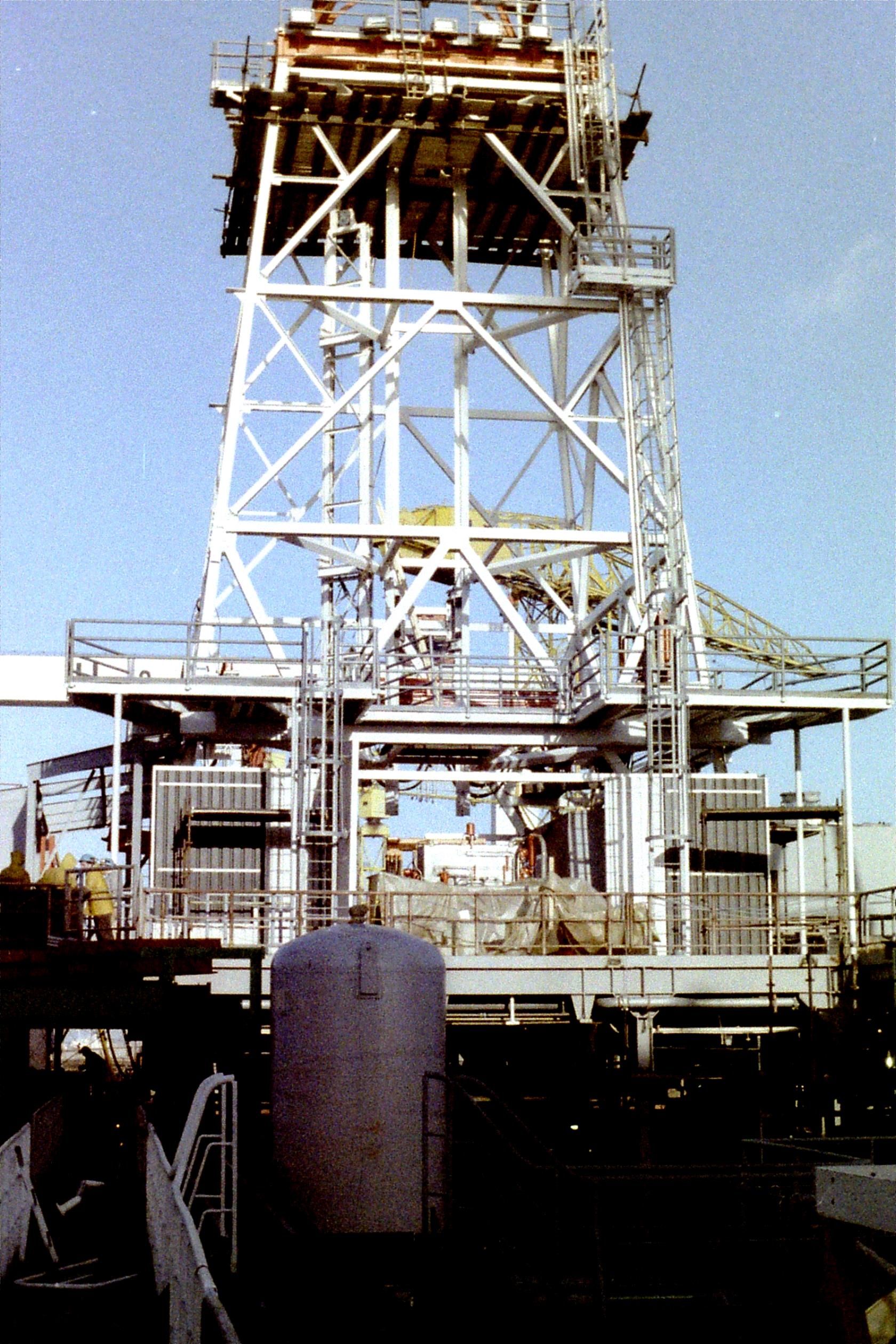
Seillean subsea operations tower 1986

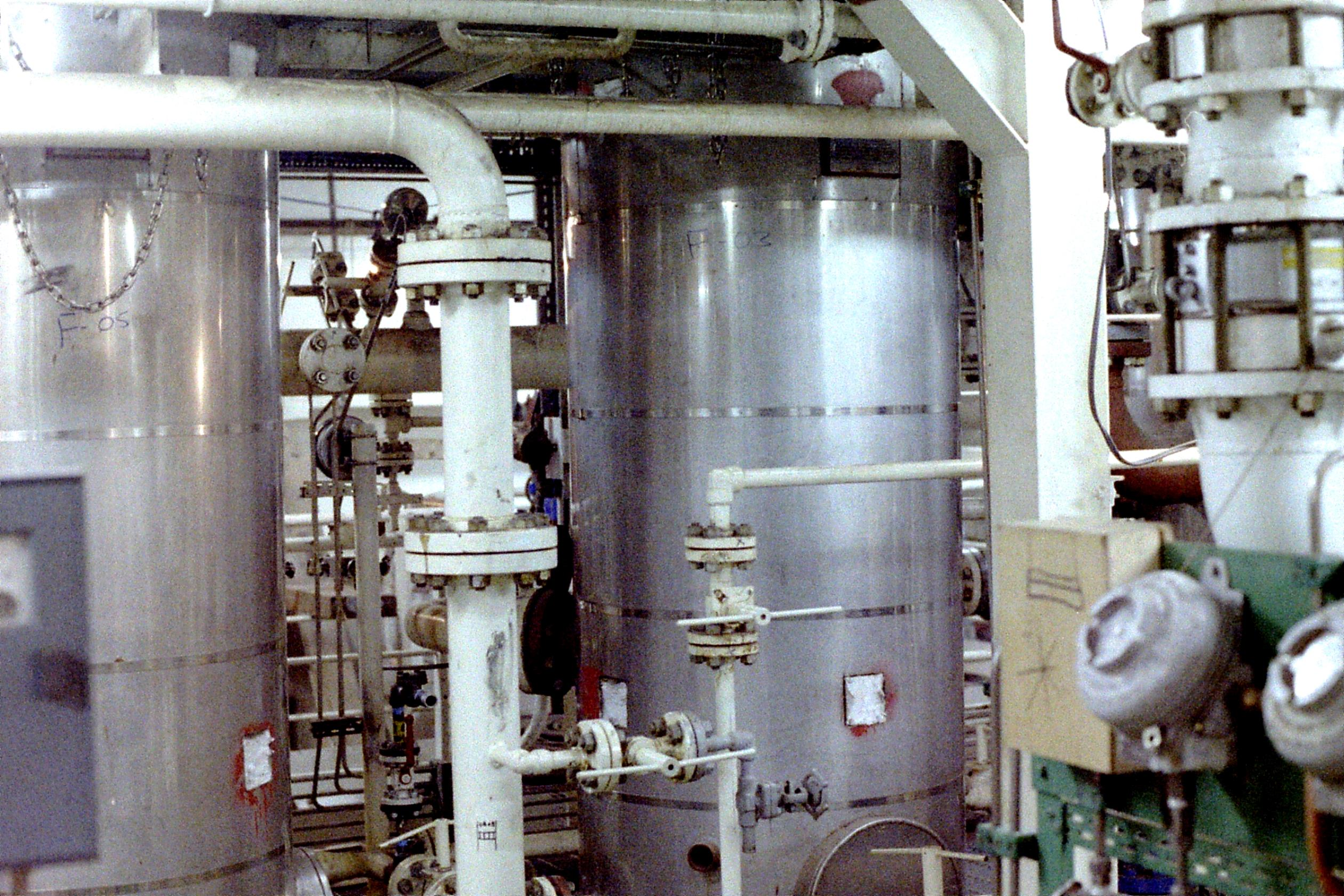
Seillean process plant 1986

FPSO Seillean was a dynamically positioned monohull floating production, storage and offloading vessel. She was classed by Lloyd's Register of Shipping as a 100A1 Oil Processing Tanker. Seallean was equipped with a flare, two cargo-handling cranes, a process plant inside the hull, a completion tower, and crew accommodation. The vessel had a displacement of 79,600 tonnes, the capacity to process up to 20,000 barrels per day (3,200 m^{3}/d), and to store up to 306,000 barrels (48,700 m^{3}) of oil. Ship's length was 249.7 metres (819 ft), breadth was 37 metres (121 ft), and depth was 20.5 metres (67 ft). She could operate at the water depth of 2,000 metres (6,600 ft). The vessel was equipped with a helideck of 29 by 27.5 metres (95 by 90 ft).

Seillean was powered by a hybrid system of three Ruston gas turbine of 3.3 MW each, and three MAN diesel driven generators 4.2 MW each. These were operated such that when fuel gas was available from production operations, the gas turbine generators generate electrical power. When fuel gas was unavailable, the diesel driven generators provided the power, supplemented by the gas turbine driven generators operating on diesel oil.

Seillean had the following production facilities:

- 26,500 barrels per day (4,210 m^{3}/d) processing plant. Maximum oil production was 25,000 barrels per day (4,000 m^{3}/d) and maximum produced water handling capability was 15,000 barrels per day (2,400 m^{3}/d).
- Storage and transport facilities for 310,000 barrels (49,000 m^{3}) of oil.
- A 6-5/8" riser which can connect to a subsea wellhead.

The crude oil was pumped from the process plant to six cargo oil tanks. During the 1998 upgrade, an offtake reel system was installed which allows ship discharge of cargo to a dynamically positioned shuttle tanker.
