= USS Guardian (MCM-5) =

Avenger-class mine countermeasures ship

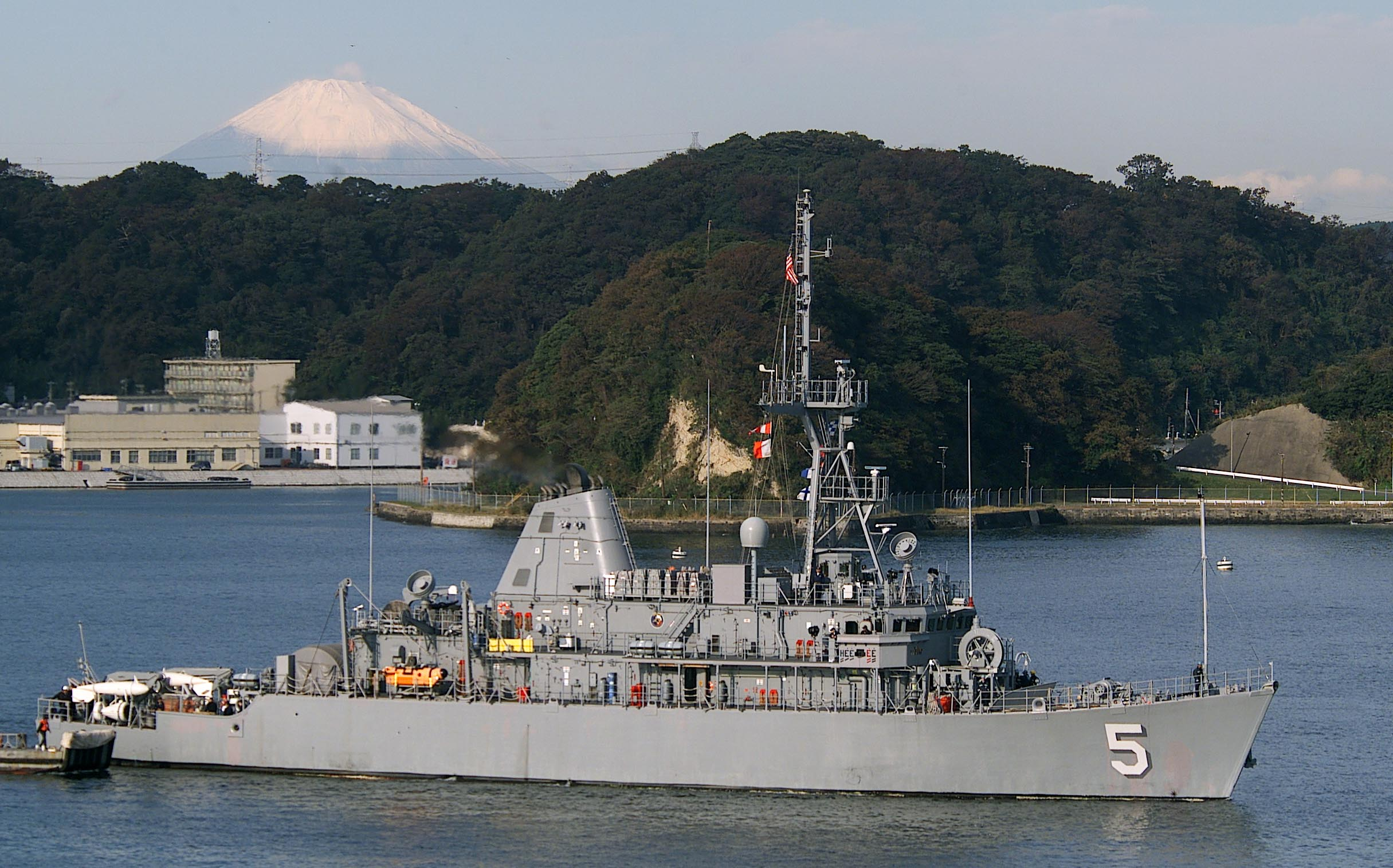
- USS Guardian underway in November 2002

History

United States
- Name: Guardian
- Builder: Peterson Builders; Sturgeon Bay, Wisconsin, US
- Laid down: 8 May 1985
- Launched: 20 June 1987
- Commissioned: 16 December 1989
- Decommissioned: 15 February 2013
- Stricken: 15 February 2013
- Motto: "Forerunner of Freedom"
- Nickname(s): "The Groundian"
- Fate: Cut up and scrapped after grounding
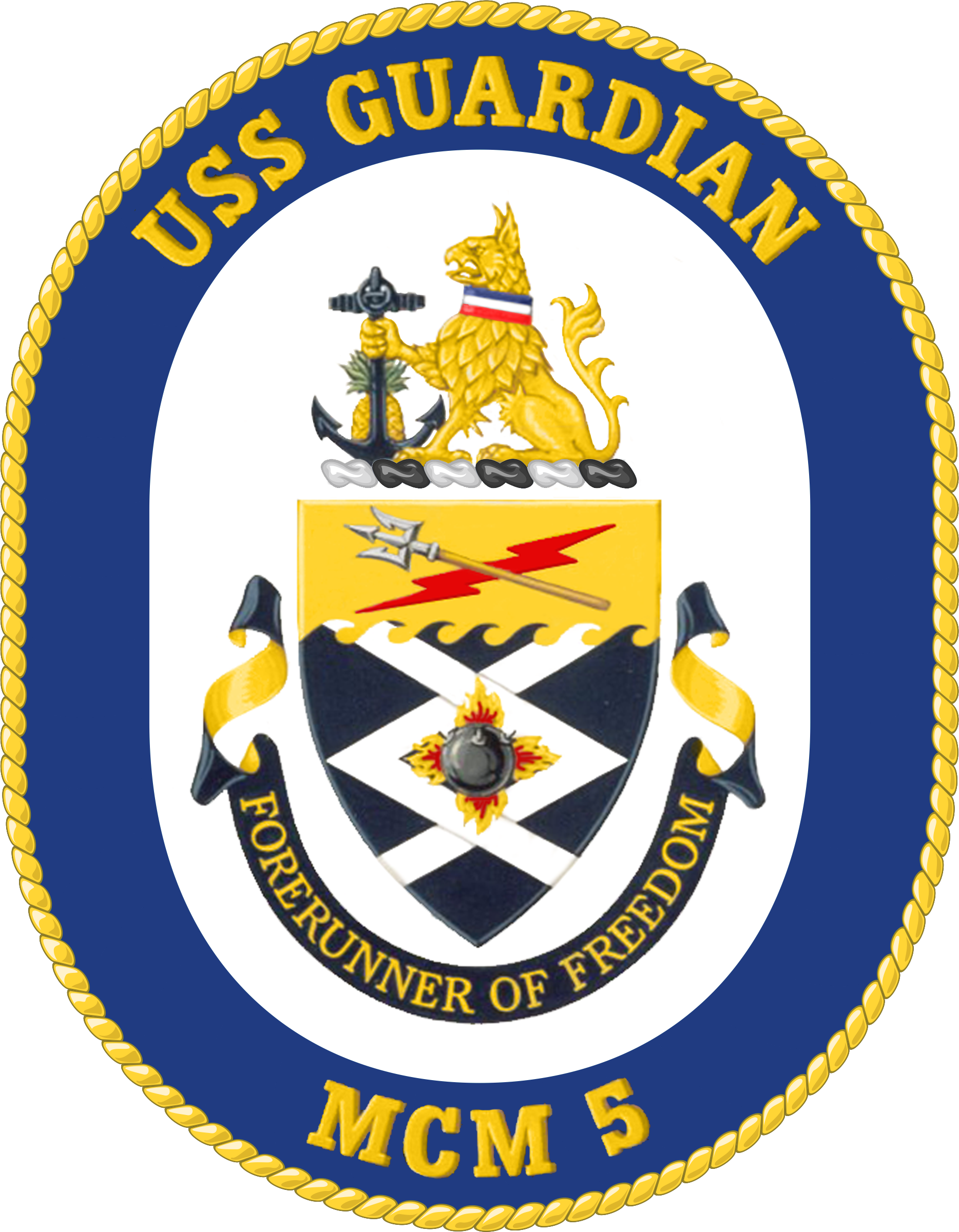
- Badge

General characteristics
- Class & type: Avenger-class mine countermeasures ship
- Displacement: 1,367 long tons (1,389 t)
- Length: 224 ft (68 m) o/a
- Beam: 39 ft (12 m)
- Draft: 13 ft (4.0 m)
- Propulsion: 4 × Isotta-Fraschini diesel engines; 2 × controllable/reversible pitch propellers; 2 × rudders; 2 × light-load electric motors
- Speed: 14 knots (26 km/h; 16 mph)
- Complement: 6 officers and 75 enlisted
- Sensors & processing systems: AN/SLQ-48 (V) Mine Neutralization System; AN/SQL-37 (V) 3 Magnetic/Acoustic Influence Minesweeping Gear; Oropesa type 0 size 1 Mechanical Sweep Equipment; MDG 1701 Marconi Magnetometer Degaussing System
- Electronic warfare & decoys: AN/SSN-2 Precise Integrated Navigation System (PINS); AN/SQQ-32 Mine-hunting sonar; AN/SPS-55 Surface Radar; AN/WSN-7 Gyro Compass
- Armament: 2 × M2 Browning .50-cal machine guns; 2 × M240 7.62 mm machine guns; 2 × Mk 19 grenade launchers

USS Guardian (MCM-5) was an Avenger-class mine countermeasures ship of the United States Navy, and was the second Navy ship to bear that name. The hulls of the Avenger-class ships were constructed of wood with an external coat of fiberglass.

Guardian was laid down on 8 May 1985 by Peterson Builders, Sturgeon Bay, Wisconsin; launched on 20 June 1987; and commissioned on 16 December 1989. In 2010, she became the first mine countermeasures vessel in the Seventh Fleet modified for a mixed-sex crew, with separate head facilities.

On 17 January 2013, Guardian ran aground on Tubbataha Reef, in a protected area of the Philippines in the middle of the Sulu Sea. The vessel was turned and pushed further onto the reef by wave action. Unable to be recovered, the vessel was decommissioned and struck from the US Naval Vessel Register on 15 February 2013. After removal of fuel and useful equipment, and after the upper superstructure was cut and lifted off of the minehunter, the wooden hull was sequentially chainsawed into four sections and lifted off of the reef by the dynamic positioning crane vessel MV Jascon 25. The bow section was cut and removed by crane on 26 March 2013. It was originally planned to cut the hull into three pieces, but the stern section had to be cut in half again. The last stern section was removed by crane from Tubbataha Reef on 30 March 2013.

== History ==
In late November 2007, Guardian and sister minesweeper Patriot tried refueling and seeking refuge from an approaching storm in Hong Kong's Victoria Harbour, but were denied entry without explanation by China. Both ships were eventually refueled at sea and returned safely to their homeports in Japan.

In February 2010, Guardian became the first mine countermeasures vessel in the Seventh Fleet to receive the Women-at-Sea modification, which was intended to allow the small vessel to accommodate a mixed-sex crew. The modification added no additional sleeping space, but did provide for separate head facilities for female crew members. However, with the exception of a very few officers, all mine countermeasures vessels in the Seventh Fleet were still manned by all-male crews at that time.

=== January 2013 grounding ===
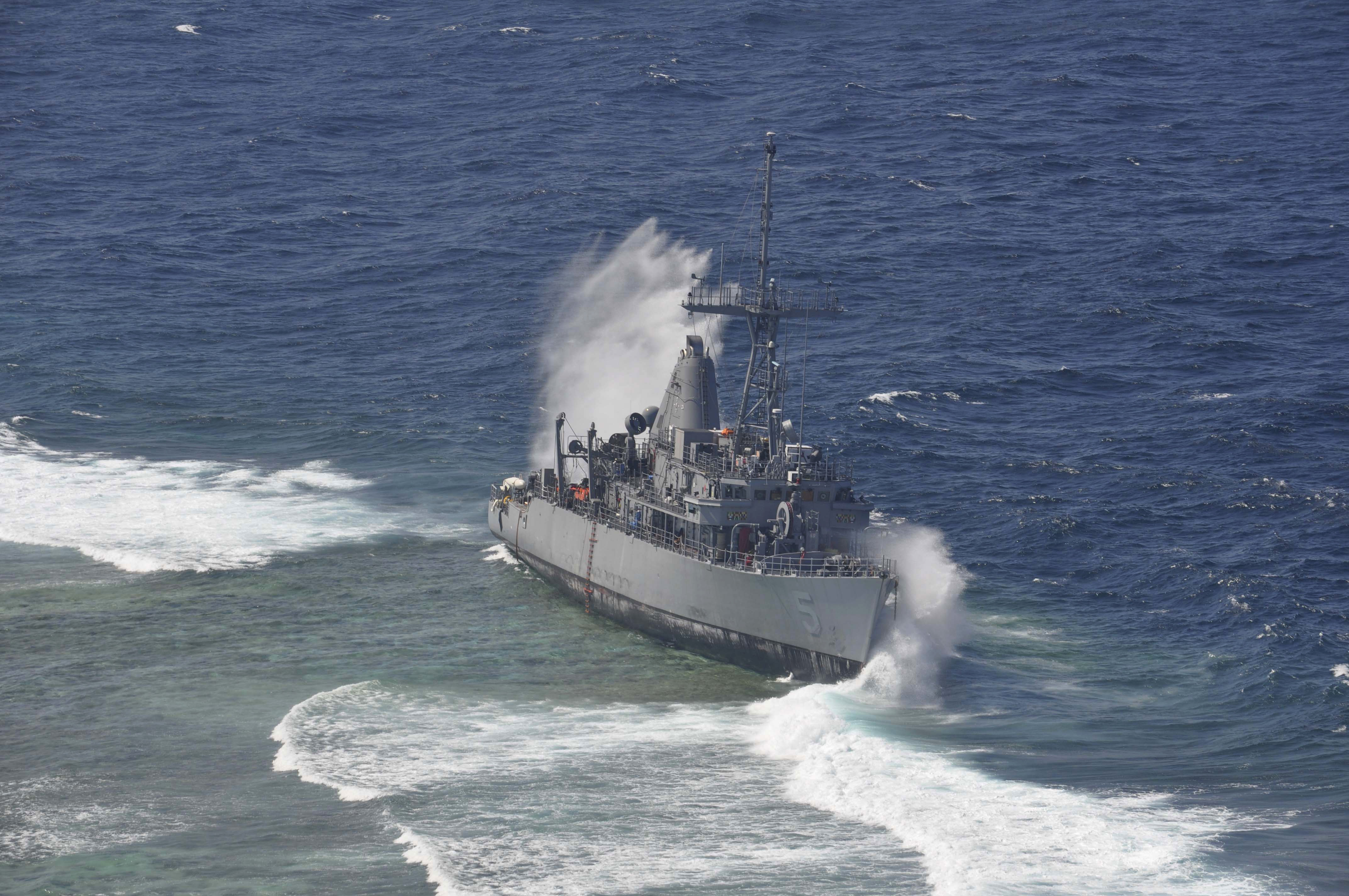
Guardian was pushed further aground onto Tubbataha Reef by wave action, as shown on 29 January 2013.

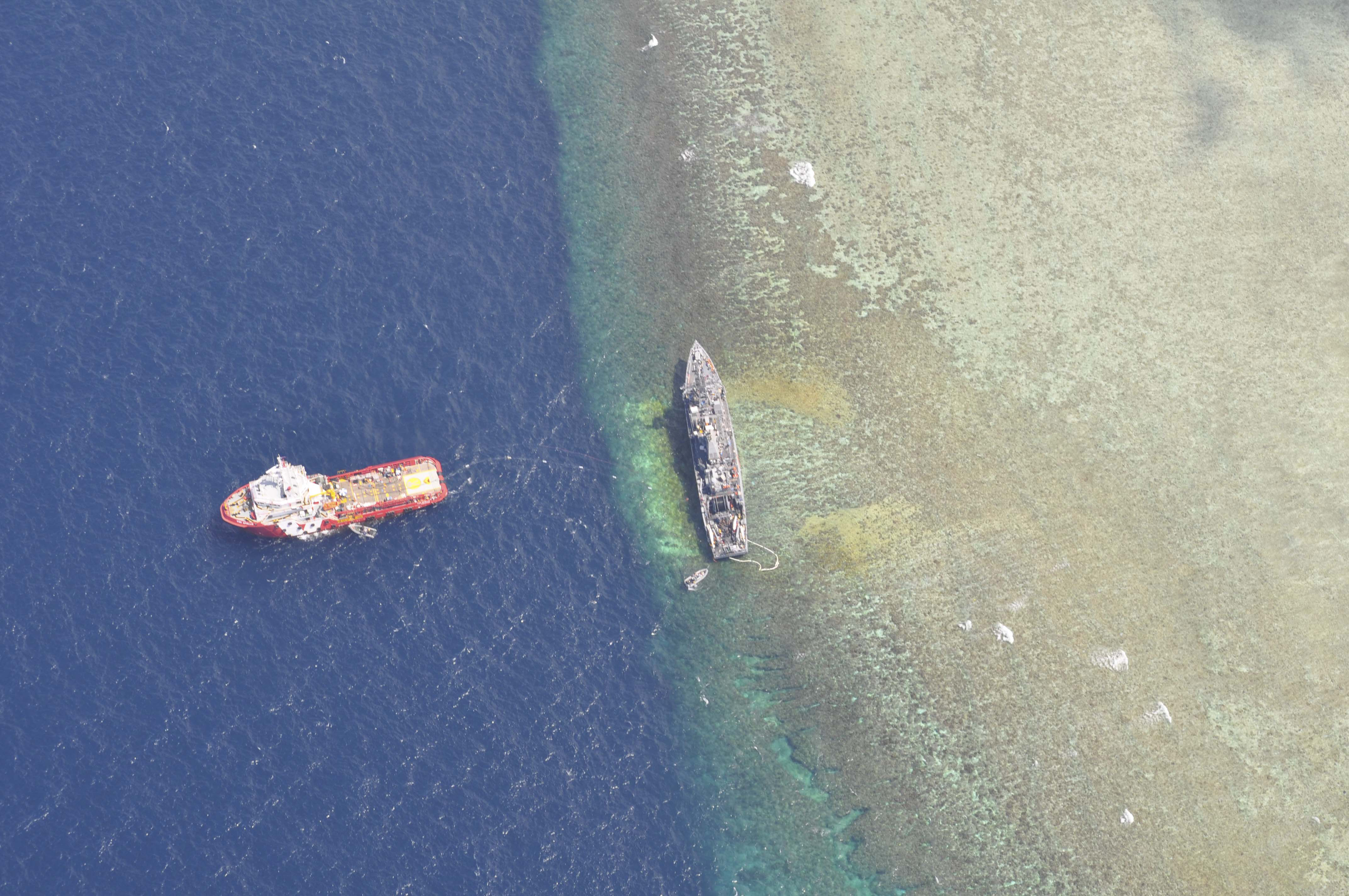
US Navy-contracted Malaysian tug Vos Apollo removed 57,000 litres (15,000 US gal) of fuel from Guardian on 24–25 January 2013, and filled her tanks with seawater.

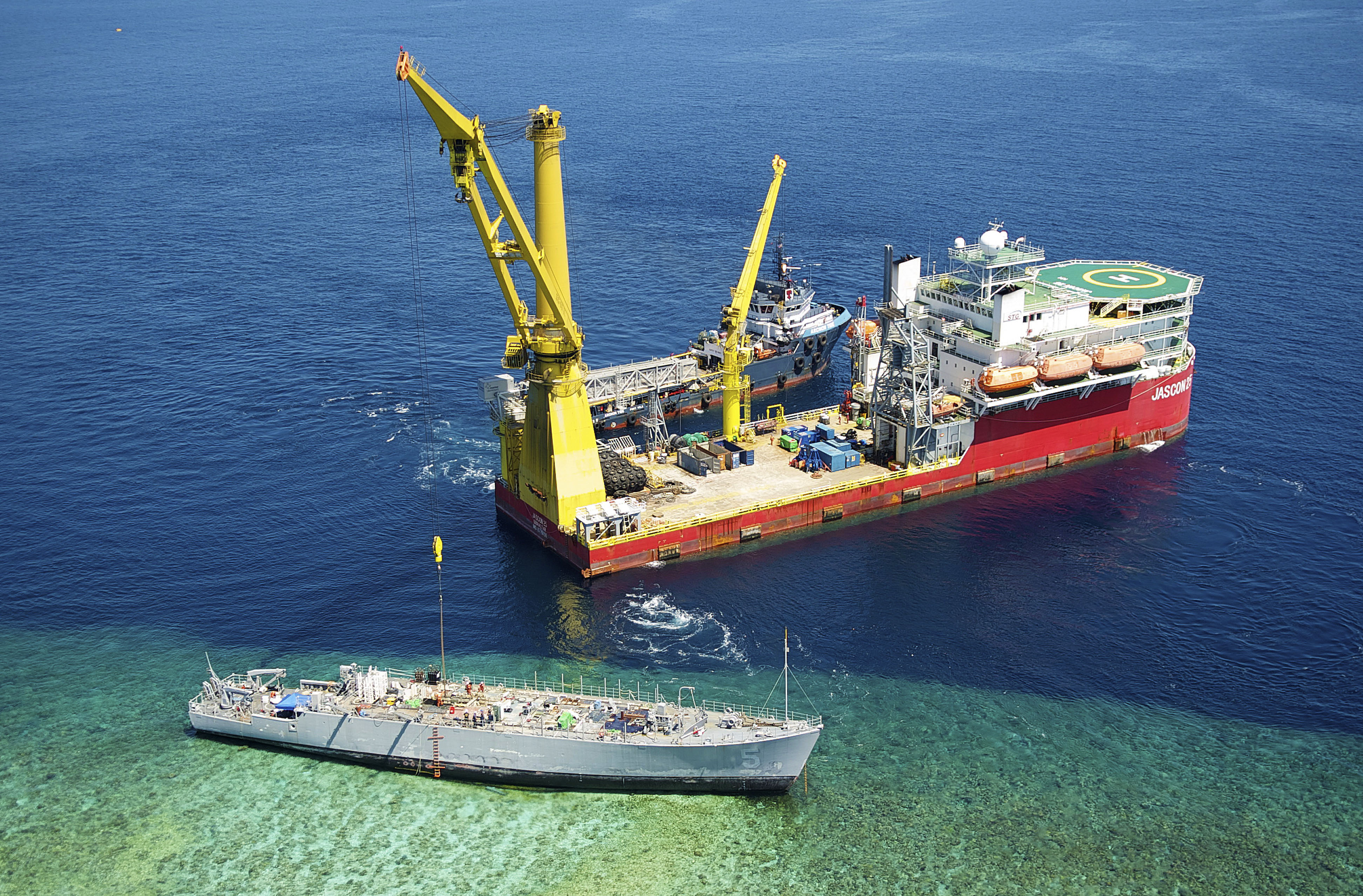
Guardian on 12 March 2013 after superstructure decks were removed, with hull to be salvaged in cut sections by crane vessel MV Jascon 25

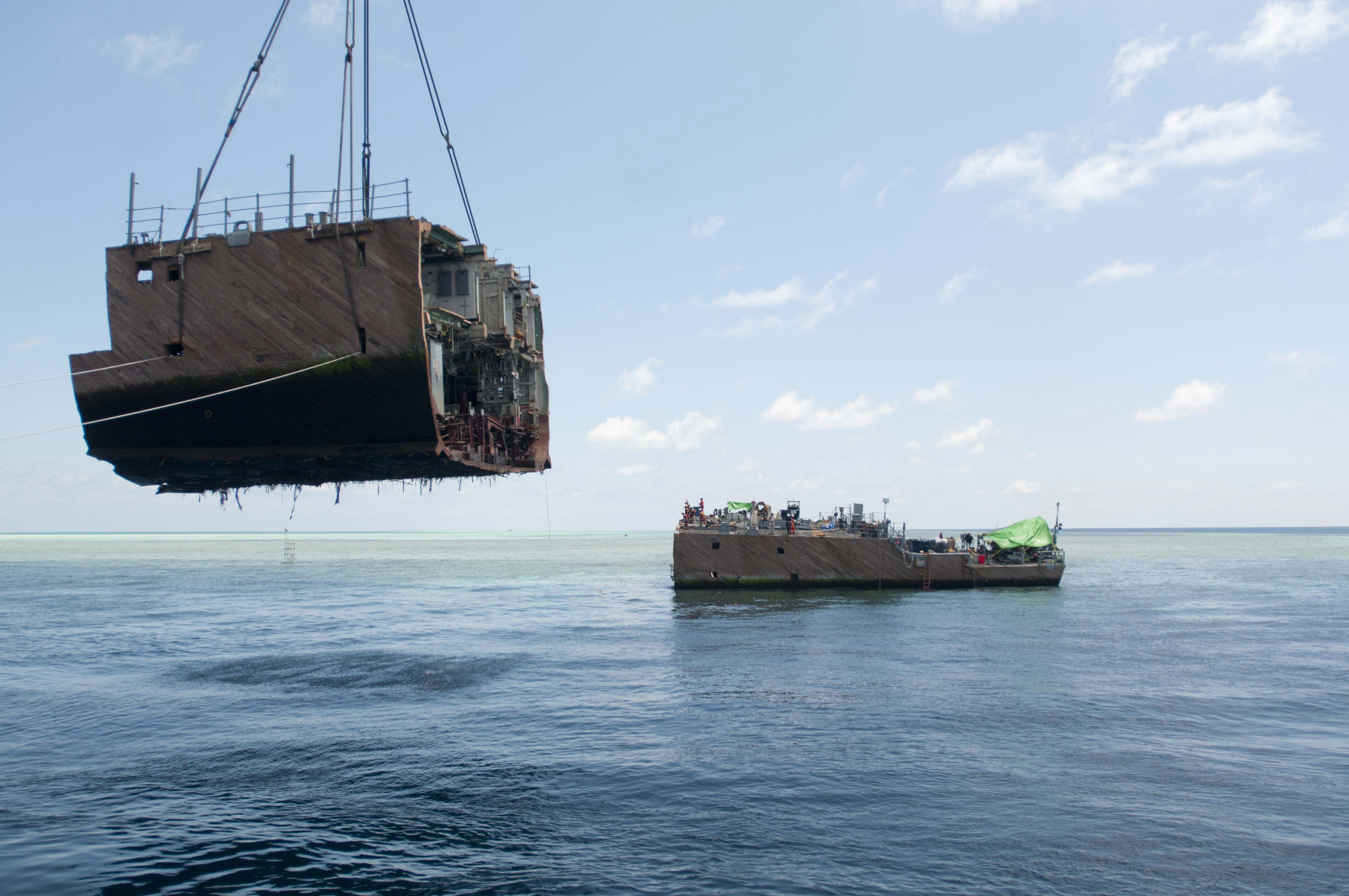
A cut-off section of Guardian's hull removed from the reef by US Navy-contracted crane vessel MV Jascon 25 on 26 March 2013

On 17 January 2013, following a port call and fuel stop in Subic, Guardian proceeded across the Sulu Sea, and entered the Tubbataha Reefs Natural Park. At 02:25 hours she ran aground on Tubbataha Reef, about 130 kilometres (70 nmi) south east of Palawan in the Philippines. About 90 minutes after the grounding, she was seen on park radar at approximately 04:00 hours local time. At the time of the accident, the ship was travelling from Subic Bay in the Philippines to Indonesia. The extent of any damage to the reef was unknown, but there was no evidence of fuel leaks. Philippines officials estimate the damage to the reef at 1,000 square metres (11,000 ft^{2}).

The second night aground the ship shifted and began taking heavy persistent seas to her port side. A petty officer navigated a tangle of machinery and pipes in the ship's bilge while it filled with water to construct shoring to reinforce the ship's hull, greatly slowing flooding and allowing the ship to maintain power. The sailor was awarded the Navy and Marine Corps Medal for his actions.

The next day, 18 January 2013, the US Navy evacuated all 79 crew members from the minesweeper to USNS Bowditch, a survey ship and MV C Champion, a submarine and special warfare support vessel. During the evacuation, another petty officer, one of two SAR swimmers aboard, saved the lives of two of his shipmates for which he was also later awarded the Navy and Marine Corps Medal. On 19 January 2013, an assessment team deployed to plan and execute the vessel's extraction. On 20 January 2013, Navy Times reported the ship was taking on water in multiple places and experiencing a slight list to port.

Originally, only the bow section of Guardian rested on the reef, but wave action pushed the entire vessel onto the reef, 20 to 30 metres (70 to 100 ft) from the edge. The guided missile destroyer USS Mustin, and salvage ship USNS Salvor arrived in the area to help in the intended extraction, as well as tugboats and Philippine Navy and Coast Guard vessels. It was intended for Guardian to be removed from the area by crane ships from Singapore, then be placed on a barge or other ship, since she was too damaged to be towed due to multiple hull penetrations. During the time the cranes traveled from Singapore to the Philippines, preparations were made for the lift. A total of 57,000 litres (15,000 US gal) of fuel were transferred from the tanks in Guardian to other ships, then refilled with seawater to keep the vessel stable. Dry food stores and the personal effects of Guardian's crew were removed as well. Salvage workers reinforced the wood-and-fiberglass hull of the minesweeper with Kevlar lines to mitigate stresses from waves hitting the vessel. Then, salvage workers from Mobile Diving and Salvage Unit One chopped the superstructure and wooden hull of the ship into multiple pieces.

On 29 January 2013, the US Navy announced the ship would be cut into three sections on the reef prior to removal, resulting in a total loss. Guardian was decommissioned and struck from the Naval Vessel Register on 15 February 2013. On 27 February 2013, salvage workers began disassembling Guardian, a process estimated to take a month. The bridge deck was removed on 4 March 2013, and on 30 March 2013, the stern section of the ship was lifted off the reef, completing the removal process. In February 2013, Guardian was replaced with sister-ship Warrior in the Seventh Fleet, with the crew of Warrior returning to San Diego, and the crew of Guardian taking over Warrior.

On 8 April 2013, the US Navy turned over digital navigation charts and other evidence, documents and data of Guardian to the Philippine Maritime Casualty Investigating Team (MCIT) and responded to "Technical and Substantive" queries. The MCIT conducted their own independent investigation and made recommendations for future navigation of the area. On 26 July 2013 it was reported that a chart produced by the National Geospatial-Intelligence Agency was inaccurate by up to 8 nautical miles (15 km; 9.2 mi). This chart was used by the crew of Guardian, and played a significant role in the grounding. Despite this, significant errors by the crew and commanding officers were also reported, including that they should have noted the inaccuracies in comparison to other charts.

Original estimates were that 4,000 square metres (43,000 sq ft) of reef was damaged but a survey done after removal, by the World Wide Fund for Nature–Philippines and the Tubbataha Management Office, measured the damage area at 2,345.67 square metres (25,248.6 sq ft). On January 20, 2015, the United States government paid to the Philippine government a total of 87 million Philippine pesos, (or US$1.97 million). This was divided as 59 million Philippine pesos for the reef damage and 29 million pesos to reimburse services provided by the Philippine Coast Guard.

The US federal government apologized for the incident and relieved four officers: the Commanding Officer, the Executive Officer, and two junior officers: the Officer of the Deck, and the Assistant Navigator and Quartermaster of the Watch at the time of the mishap.

"The initial investigation findings clearly indicate that (the four) at the time of the grounding did not adhere to standard US Navy navigation procedures,"

The US government has acknowledged that the grounding was entirely preventable and caused by human error and a failure of leadership to provide adequate oversight and direction in planning and executing the Navigation Plan.

=== Chart error ===
An investigation found that the National Geospatial-Intelligence Agency (NGA) had provided a coastal-scale Digital Nautical Chart to Guardian that depicted the Tubbataha Reef 7.8 nautical miles (14.4 km; 9.0 mi) east-southeast of its actual location. The NGA had known about the inaccuracy, which was caused by human error, since 2011, and had consequently modified a smaller-scale electronic chart. But the agency had failed to publish a correction for the larger-scale chart that Guardian was using when it ran aground.

== Awards ==
- Navy Unit Commendation
- Meritorious Unit Citation (2 awards)
- Navy E Ribbon (6 awards)
- Combat Action Ribbon
- National Defense Service Medal with star
- Southwest Asia Service Medal with one campaign star
- Global War on Terrorism Service Medal

== See also ==
- 2009 USS Port Royal grounding
