= Samuel Roberts =

Samuel or Sam Roberts may refer to:

== Arts and entertainment ==
- Sam Roberts (journalist) (born 1947), American journalist for The New York Times
- Sam Roberts (singer) (born 1974), Canadian singer-songwriter
- Sam Roberts (radio personality) (born 1983), American radio personality
- Sam Roberts-Smith (born 1985), Australian operatic baritone
- Sam Roberts (fl. 1990s), American radio disc jockey for KZPS

== Law and politics ==
- Sir Samuel Roberts, 1st Baronet (1852–1926), British Conservative member of parliament, 1902–1923
- Sir Samuel Roberts, 2nd Baronet (1882–1955), British Conservative member of parliament, 1921–1935
- Samuel J. Roberts (1907–1987), American jurist, chief justice of the Supreme Court of Pennsylvania
- Samuel D. Roberts (born 1956), American politician, member of the New York State Assembly

== Sports ==
- Samuel Roberts (rugby union) (fl. 1880s), English rugby union footballer
- Samuel Grenville Roberts (1919–1940), English footballer
- Sam Roberts (American football) (born 1998), American football player

== Other people ==
- Samuel Roberts (Sheffield writer) (1763–1848), English cutler and social campaigner
- Samuel Roberts (Royal Navy officer), British commander of HMS Starr in the War of 1812
- Samuel Roberts (Welsh writer) (1800–1885), Welsh political and economic writer
- Samuel Roberts (mathematician) (1827–1913), British mathematician
- Samuel E. Roberts (1824–1905), English-born Australian printer and publisher in Adelaide
- Samuel B. Roberts (1921–1942), U.S. Navy coxswain killed in the Battle of Guadalcanal
- Sam E. Roberts (1887–1966), American otolaryngologist, medical academic, inventor, and medical writer

== Other uses ==
- USS Samuel B. Roberts, multiple ships of the United States Navy
