= Paul X. Rinn =

American naval officer (1946–2022)

Paul Xavier Rinn
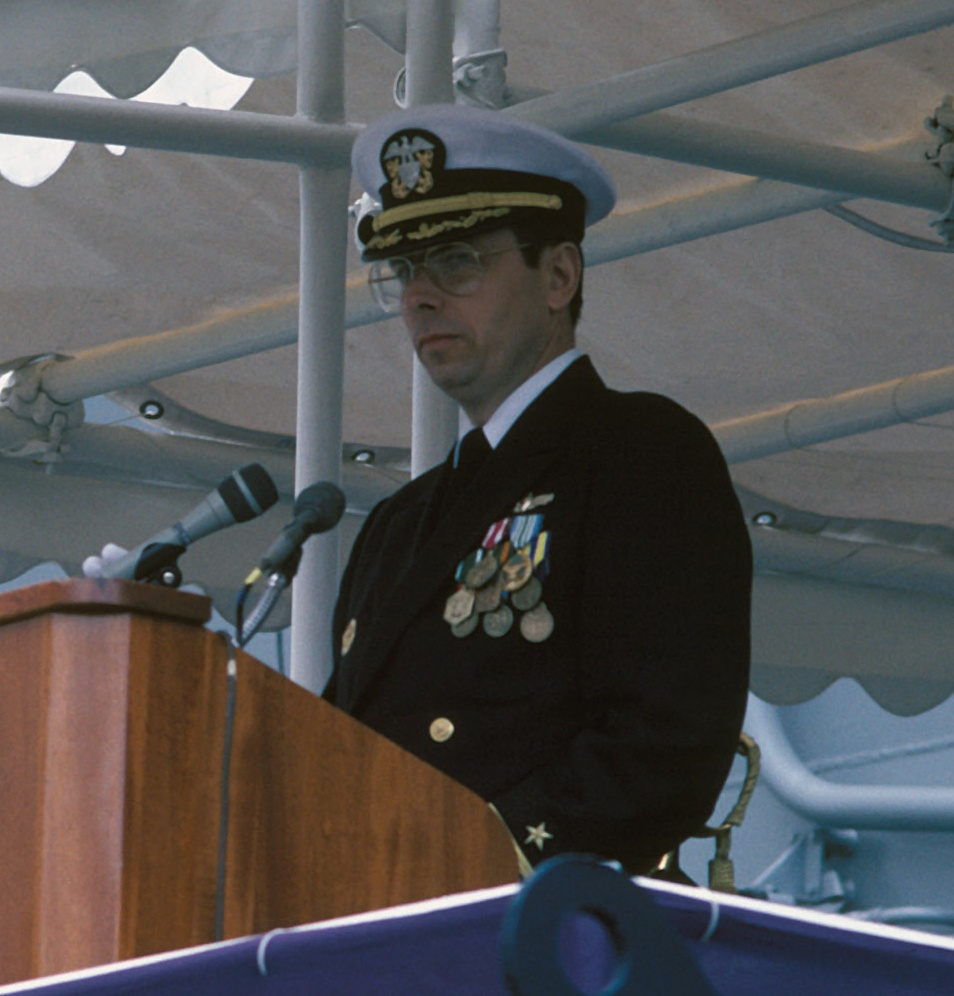
- Rinn in 1986
- Born: 13 September 1946; The Bronx, New York, U.S.
- Died: 3 August 2022 (aged 75); Boston, Massachusetts, U.S.
- Burial place: Arlington National Cemetery, Virginia, U.S.
- Spouse: Pamela
- Children: 3
- Military career
- Branch: United States Navy
- Service years: 1968-1997
- Rank: Captain
- Commands: USS Samuel B. Roberts (FFG-58); USS Leyte Gulf (CG-55)
- Conflicts: Vietnam War; Iran–Iraq War; Tanker War
- Awards: Legion of Merit with "V" device; Purple Heart; Meritorious Service Medal 5; Joint Service Commendation Medal Navy Commendation Medal; Navy Achievement Medal; Combat Action Ribbon; John Paul Jones Leadership Award

Paul Xavier Rinn (13 September 1946 – 3 August 2022) was an officer in the United States Navy. He was the first commanding officer of the USS Samuel B. Roberts (FFG-58) and was in command when the ship struck a mine in the Persian Gulf on 14 April 1988. He later commanded USS Leyte Gulf (CG-55) and was the Iraqi Embargo Commander in the Red Sea and the Persian Gulf. He retired in 1997 at the rank of captain.

== Background ==
Paul X. Rinn was born in the Bronx, New York City, in 1946. His father was a law school graduate and his mother was a grade school teacher. His older brother Greg was also a naval officer and inspired Rinn to follow in his footsteps. He attended an all-boys Roman Catholic high school in the Bronx Mount Saint Michael Academy graduating in 1964. He attended Marist College and graduated in 1968. Rinn obtained a Masters of Business Administration from Salve Regina College while a student at the Naval War College, combining credits from studies at Stanford University, Harvard University, and Salve Regina. He had three children and six grandchildren.

== Career ==
Rinn received his commission in 1968 through the Navy's Reserve Officer Candidate program at Navy Officer Candidate School in Newport, Rhode Island. He first served a three-year tour on USS Sarsfield (DD-837), a Gearing-class destroyer deploying to South America, the Middle East, and the Vietnam gun line. In the early 1970s, Rinn served as a counterinsurgency adviser and military training officer along the Mekong River and was involved in combat operations along its upper reaches. In 1975, he was the weapons officer on USS Blakely (FF-1072), a Knox-class frigate, and deployed to the Mediterranean for six months. From 1976 through 1979, he served as operations and tactics officer in the First Canadian Destroyer Squadron operating in the North Atlantic and Mediterranean sea. In 1980-81, he attended the Naval War College in Newport and graduated with distinction. He then served as executive officer on USS Bowen (FF-1079), a Knox-class frigate, which deployed to the Mediterranean for anti-submarine operations. During that deployment, Bowen won an unprecedented two Sixth Fleet "Antisubmarine Hook 'Em awards" for actions against significant real-world contacts of interest. Rinn was promoted early to commander and ordered to be Chief Staff Officer of Destroyer Squadron 36 in Charleston, South Carolina, from 1982 to 1984, deploying twice to the Mediterranean and Persian Gulf.

He was selected to command Samuel B. Roberts (FFG-58) and became involved in her construction at Bath Iron Works in Bath, Maine, in the fall of 1984. Roberts was commissioned 12 April 1986. After extensive operations in the Atlantic and Caribbean, Samuel B. Roberts was deployed to the Persian Gulf to participate in Operation Ernest Will, escorting American-flagged shipping and protecting U.S. interests. The Roberts conducted 12 convoys and other interdiction operations in the northern Persian Gulf. On 14 April 1988, the ship inadvertently entered an Iranian minefield and struck an M-08 mine. The resulting blast left the ship in a severe sinking condition. However, the outstanding performance of the crew saved the ship from sinking without the loss of life. After completing temporary repairs in Dubai and floating Roberts onto the heavy-lift vessel Mighty Servant 2, Rinn turned over command to CDR John Townes III on 20 June 1988. Rinn was awarded the Legion of Merit with Combat V by the Chairman of the Joint Chiefs of Staff, Admiral William Crowe; additionally, he was awarded the United States Navy League's "Stephen Decatur Award" for Operational Excellence as well as the United States Congress National Day of Excellence Award. He was also a finalist for the James Bond Stockdale Award for Inspirational Leadership.

Following his tour on Samuel B. Roberts, Rinn led the United States Navy's Surface Ship Combat Readiness and Survivability office in the Pentagon. He was promoted to captain in 1990 and served as Executive Assistant to the Deputy Chief of Naval Operations for Surface Warfare. In 1994, he was ordered to command USS Leyte Gulf (CG-55), a Ticonderoga-class guided missile cruiser named for the battle in which the first USS Samuel B. Roberts (DE-413) was sunk. He deployed to the Persian Gulf on Leyte Gulf and was the commander of the Iraqi Oil Embargo Task Force in the Red Sea and later Embargo Commander and Strike Commander in the Northern Persian Gulf. Leyte Gulf was named the top Aegis Cruiser in the Atlantic Fleet, winning the "Battle E award" and was a finalist for the coveted "Battenburg Cup," awarded to the top ship in the Atlantic fleet. Rinn was awarded the United States Navy League's John Paul Jones Inspirational Leadership Award. Following his tour on Leyte Gulf, Rinn served in the Pentagon as Special Assistant to two successive Chiefs of Naval Operations.

Captain Paul X. Rinn retired from the United States Navy in 1997. He took a vice president position at the international consulting firm Whitney, Bradley and Brown, near Washington, D.C., where he led the company's largest sector, management consulting, until his retirement in 2012. He was also the president of Rinnspeaks LLC, delivering leadership and motivational talks around the world.

Rinn was inducted into the Surface Warfare Hall of Fame in 2009.

On 3 August 2022, Rinn unexpectedly died in Boston, at the age of 75.
