= USS Samuel B. Roberts =

USS Samuel B. Roberts may refer to the following ships of the United States Navy:

- USS Samuel B. Roberts (DE-413), was a John C. Butler-class destroyer escort, commissioned in 1944 and sunk in the Battle off Samar while defending the escort carriers (CVEs) of Task Unit 77.4.3 ("Taffy 3").
- USS Samuel B. Roberts (DD-823), was a Gearing-class destroyer, commissioned in 1946 and struck in 1970.
- USS Samuel B. Roberts (FFG-58), was an Oliver Hazard Perry-class guided missile frigate, commissioned in 1986 and decommissioned in 2015.

== See also ==
- USS Roberts (DE-749)
