= USS Samuel B. Roberts (FFG-58) =

Oliver Hazard Perry-class guided missile frigate (1986–2015)

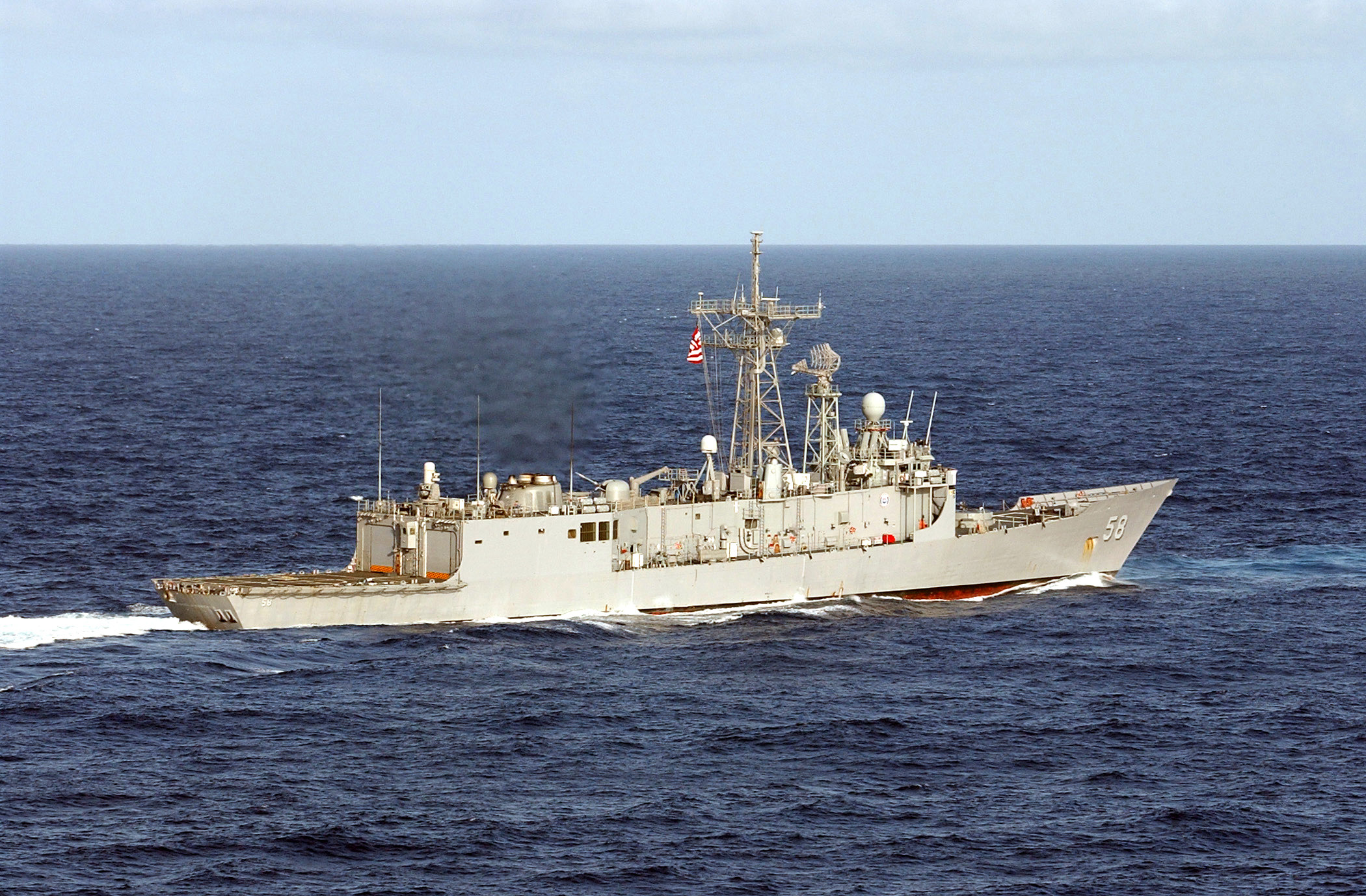
- USS Samuel B. Roberts (FFG-58), navigates in the Caribbean Sea during an exercise, 9 April 2007.

History

United States
- Name: Samuel B. Roberts
- Namesake: Coxswain Samuel B. Roberts
- Awarded: 22 March 1982
- Builder: Bath Iron Works, Bath, Maine
- Laid down: 21 May 1984
- Launched: 8 December 1984
- Sponsored by: Mrs. Jack Yusen
- Commissioned: 12 April 1986
- Decommissioned: 22 May 2015
- Identification: Hull symbol: FFG-58; Code letters: NSBR
- Motto: "No Higher Honor"
- Nickname(s): "Sammy B"
- Fate: Scrapped 2022
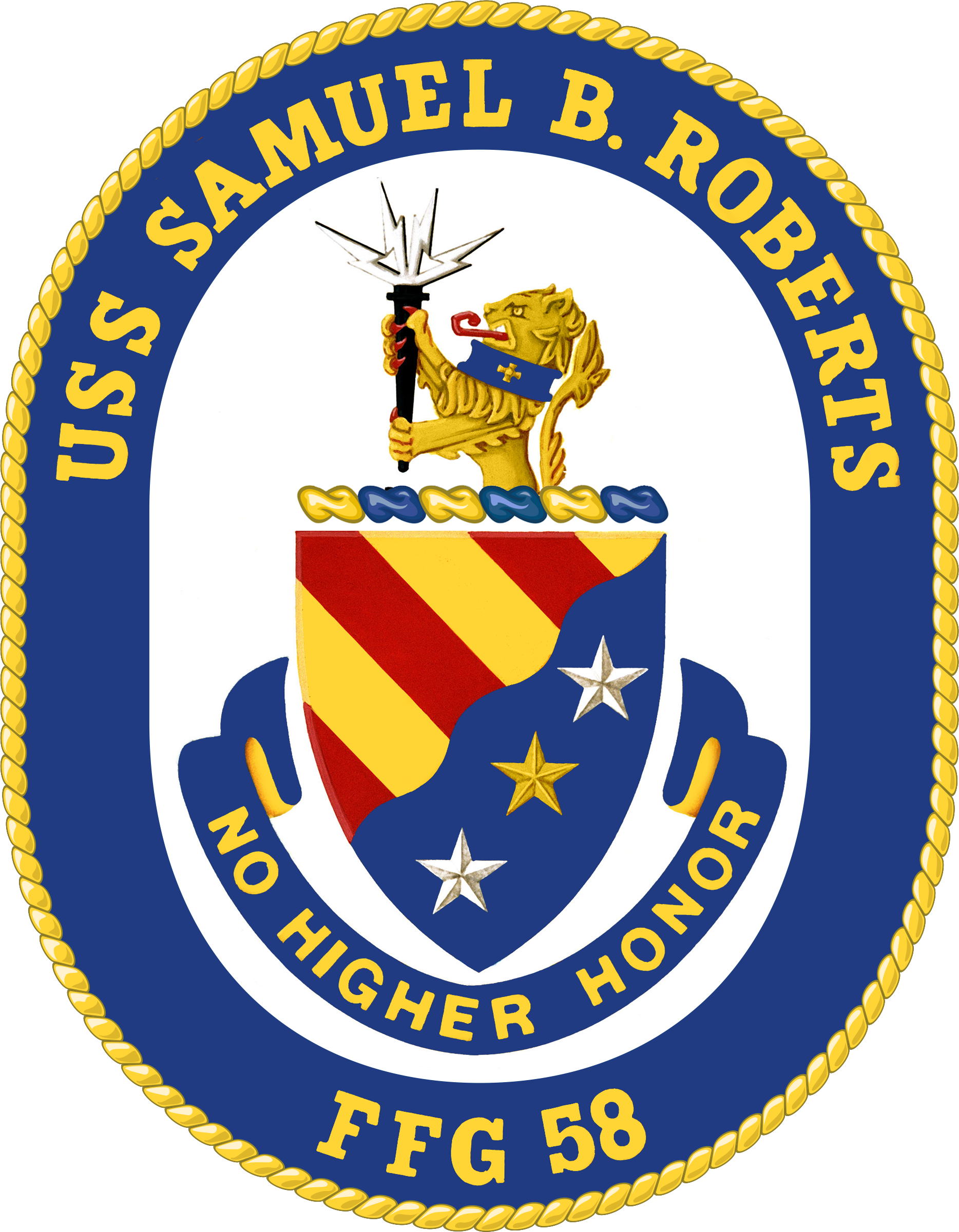
- Badge

General characteristics
- Class & type: Oliver Hazard Perry-class frigate
- Displacement: 4,100 long tons (4,200 t), full load
- Length: 453 feet (138 m), overall
- Beam: 45 feet (14 m)
- Draft: 22 feet (6.7 m)
- Propulsion: 2 × General Electric LM2500-30 gas turbines generating 41,000 shp (31 MW) through a single shaft and variable pitch propeller; 2 × Auxiliary Propulsion Units, 350 hp (260 kW) retractable electric azimuth thrusters for maneuvering and docking.
- Speed: over 29 knots (54 km/h)
- Range: 5,000 nautical miles at 18 knots (9,300 km at 33 km/h)
- Complement: 15 officers and 190 enlisted, plus SH-60 LAMPS detachment of roughly six officer pilots and 15 enlisted maintainers
- Sensors & processing systems: AN/SPS-49 air-search radar; AN/SPS-55 surface-search radar; CAS and STIR fire-control radar; AN/SQS-56 sonar.
- Electronic warfare & decoys: AN/SLQ-32; Mark 36 SRBOC
- Armament: 1 × OTO Melara Mk 75 76 mm/62 caliber naval gun; 1 x delivered with 1×Mk 13 Mod 4 single-arm launcher for Harpoon anti-ship missiles and SM-1MR Standard anti-ship/air missiles (40 round magazine) currently removed; 2 × Mk 32 triple-tube (324 mm) launchers for Mark 46 torpedoes; 1 × Vulcan Phalanx CIWS; 4 × .50 cal (12.7 mm) machine guns.
- Aircraft carried: 2 × SH-60 helicopters as LAMPS III
- Aviation facilities: 2 × hangars; RAST helicopter hauldown system

USS Samuel B. Roberts (FFG-58) was one of the final ships in the United States Navy's Oliver Hazard Perry-class of guided missile frigates (FFG). Commissioned in 1986, the ship was severely damaged by an Iranian mine in 1988, leading U.S. forces to respond with Operation Praying Mantis. Repaired and returned to duty, the ship served until decommissioned in 2015.

== Commissioning and namesake ==
The frigate was named for Samuel B. Roberts, a Navy coxswain who was killed while evacuating the U.S. Marines during the battle of Guadalcanal in 1942. Roberts was posthumously awarded the Navy Cross.

Samuel B. Roberts was the third U.S. ship to bear the coxswain's name, after Samuel B. Roberts (DE-413), a John C. Butler-class destroyer escort, commissioned in 1944 and sunk in the Battle off Samar later that year; and Samuel B. Roberts (DD-823), a Gearing-class destroyer, commissioned in 1946 and struck in 1970.

Samuel B. Roberts was launched in December 1984 by Bath Iron Works, Bath, Maine and sponsored by the wife of Jack Yusen, a member of DE-413's crew. The frigate was put in commission in April 1986 under the command of Commander Paul X. Rinn.

== 1988 deployment and mine strike ==
Samuel B. Roberts deployed from her homeport in Newport, Rhode Island, in January 1988, heading for the Persian Gulf to participate in Operation Earnest Will, the escort of reflagged Kuwaiti tankers during the Iran–Iraq War. Samuel B. Roberts had arrived in the Persian Gulf and was heading for a refueling rendezvous with USS San Jose on 14 April when the ship struck an Iranian mine in the central Persian Gulf, an area she had safely transited a few days earlier. The mine blew a 15-foot (4.6 m) hole in the hull, flooded the engine room, and knocked the two gas turbines from their mounts. The blast also broke the keel of the ship; such structural damage is almost always fatal to a vessel. The crew fought fire and flooding for five hours and saved the ship. Among other steps, sailors cinched cables on the cracked superstructure in an effort to stabilize it. She used her auxiliary thrusters to get out of the minefield at 5 kn (5.8 mph; 9.3 km/h). San Jose's helicopters provided firefighting and engineering supplies to augment the crew's efforts. According to How We Fight, by the US Naval War College, the ship never lost combat capability with her radars and Mark 13 missile launcher. However, according to No Higher Honor by Bradley Peniston, the ship lost power for at least five minutes. After power was lost, the radars were disconnected to allow restoration of the power grid. The ship lost track of an Sa'am frigate and an Iranian P-3 that it had been monitoring. Ten sailors were medevaced by HC-5 CH-46s embarked on San Jose for injuries sustained in the blast; six returned to Samuel B. Roberts in a day or so. Four burn victims were sent for treatment to a military hospital in Germany, partly through the assistance of the 2nd Aeromedical Evacuation Squadron, USAF. Eventually they were moved to medical facilities in the United States.

When U.S. divers recovered several unexploded mines, they found that their serial numbers fitted into the sequence on mines seized the previous September aboard an Iranian mine-layer named Iran Ajr. Four days later, U.S. forces retaliated against Iran in Operation Praying Mantis, a one-day campaign that was the largest American surface engagement since World War II. U.S. ships, aircraft, and troops destroyed two Iranian oil platforms allegedly used to control Iranian naval forces in the Persian Gulf, sank the Iranian frigate IRIS Sahand (1969), damaged another, and sank at least three armed high-speed boats. The U.S. lost one Marine helicopter and its crew of two airmen in what appeared to be a night maneuver accident rather than a result of hostile operations.

== Repairs ==
On 27 June 1988, Samuel B. Roberts was loaded onto Mighty Servant 2, a semi-submersible heavy lift ship owned by Dutch shipping firm Wijsmuller Transport, and carried back to Newport for $1.3 million. The frigate arrived at BIW's Portland, Maine, yard on 6 October 1988 for repairs. The repair job was unique: the entire engine room was cut out of the hull, and a 315-ton replacement module was jacked up and welded into place. She undocked 1 April 1989 for sea trials.

The repairs were completed three weeks ahead of schedule at a cost of $89.5 million, $3.5 million less than expected. By comparison, Princeton, which was damaged by a moored mine during the 1991 Gulf War, was repaired for $24 million; however, the cruiser was not directly struck by the mine and her displacement is nearly twice that of Samuel B. Roberts. The mine that nearly sank Samuel B. Roberts had an estimated cost of $1,500.

After 13 months of repairs, Samuel B. Roberts was returned to service in a 16 October 1989 ceremony.

== After repair ==
Samuel B. Roberts made her second deployment in 1990 for Operation Desert Shield and Operation Desert Storm. The frigate operated as part of the Red Sea Maritime Interception Force, an international force of ships that enforced U.N. sanctions against Iraq. The frigate's sailors boarded more than 100 merchant ships in efforts to prevent cargo shipments to or from Iraq. On 28 March 1991, she returned to Newport.

"Sammy B", as the ship is sometimes called, was later homeported in Mayport, Florida.

On 30 August 1991, Joseph A. Sestak took command of Samuel B. Roberts, which was named the Atlantic Fleet's best surface combatant in the 1993 Battenberg Cup competition.

Samuel B. Roberts was decommissioned at Mayport on 22 May 2015, then towed to the Naval Inactive Ship Maintenance Facility in Philadelphia.

In late 2022, the ship was towed from Philadelphia to EMR International Shipbreaking Limited in Brownsville, Texas, for scrapping.

== Gallery ==
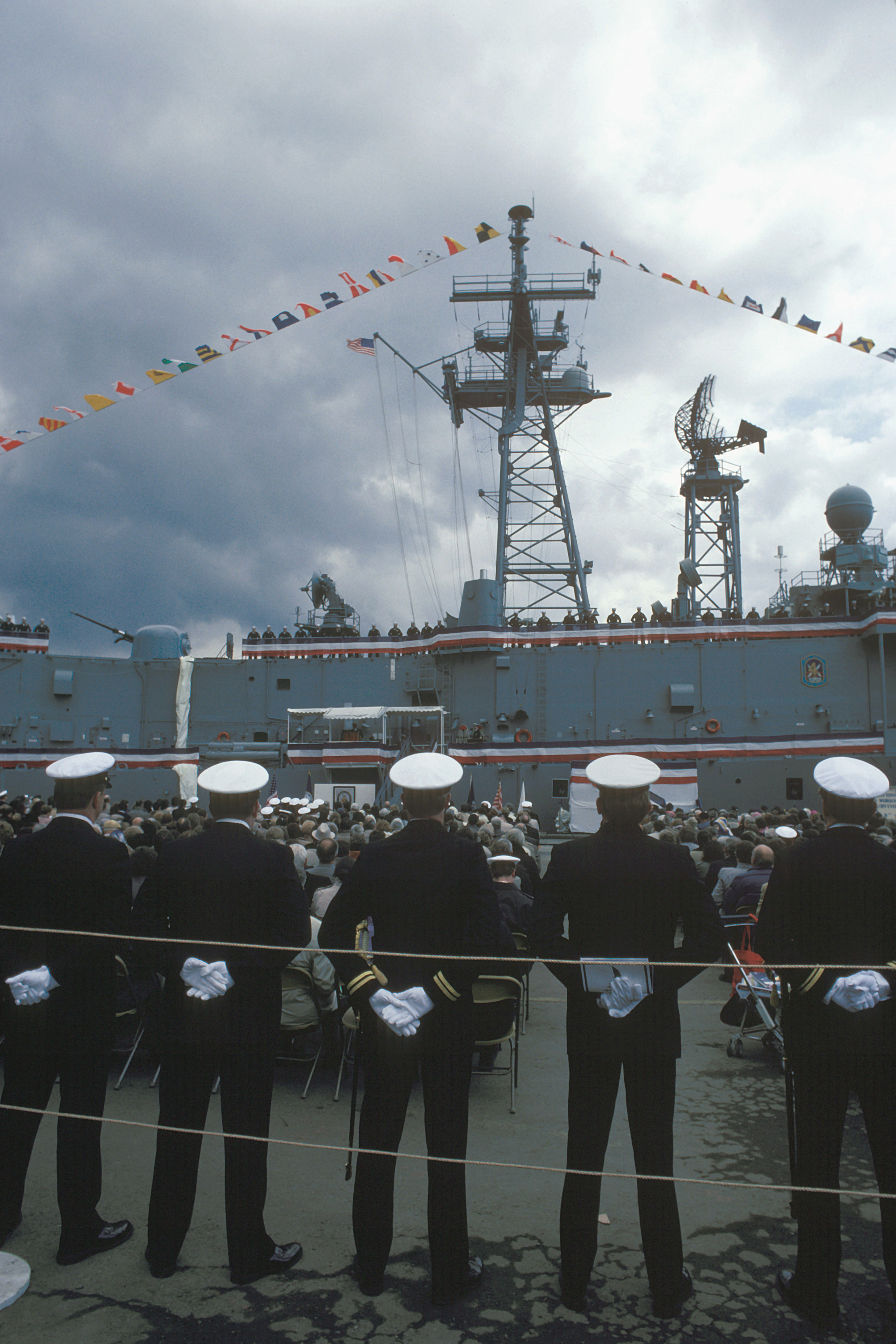
Samuel B. Roberts on the day of her commissioning, 12 April 1986

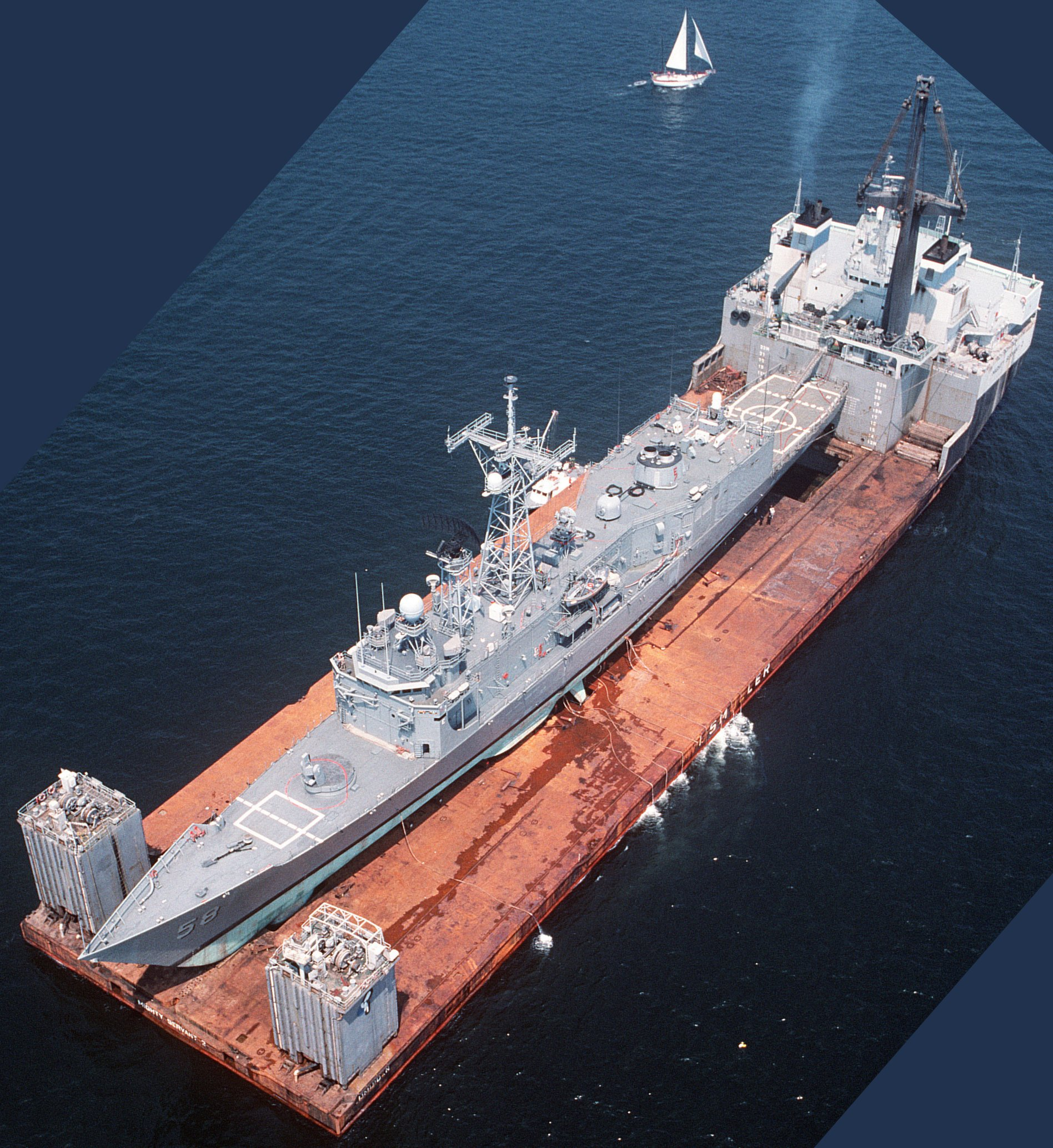
MV Mighty Servant 2 carrying the mine-damaged Samuel B. Roberts on 31 July 1988

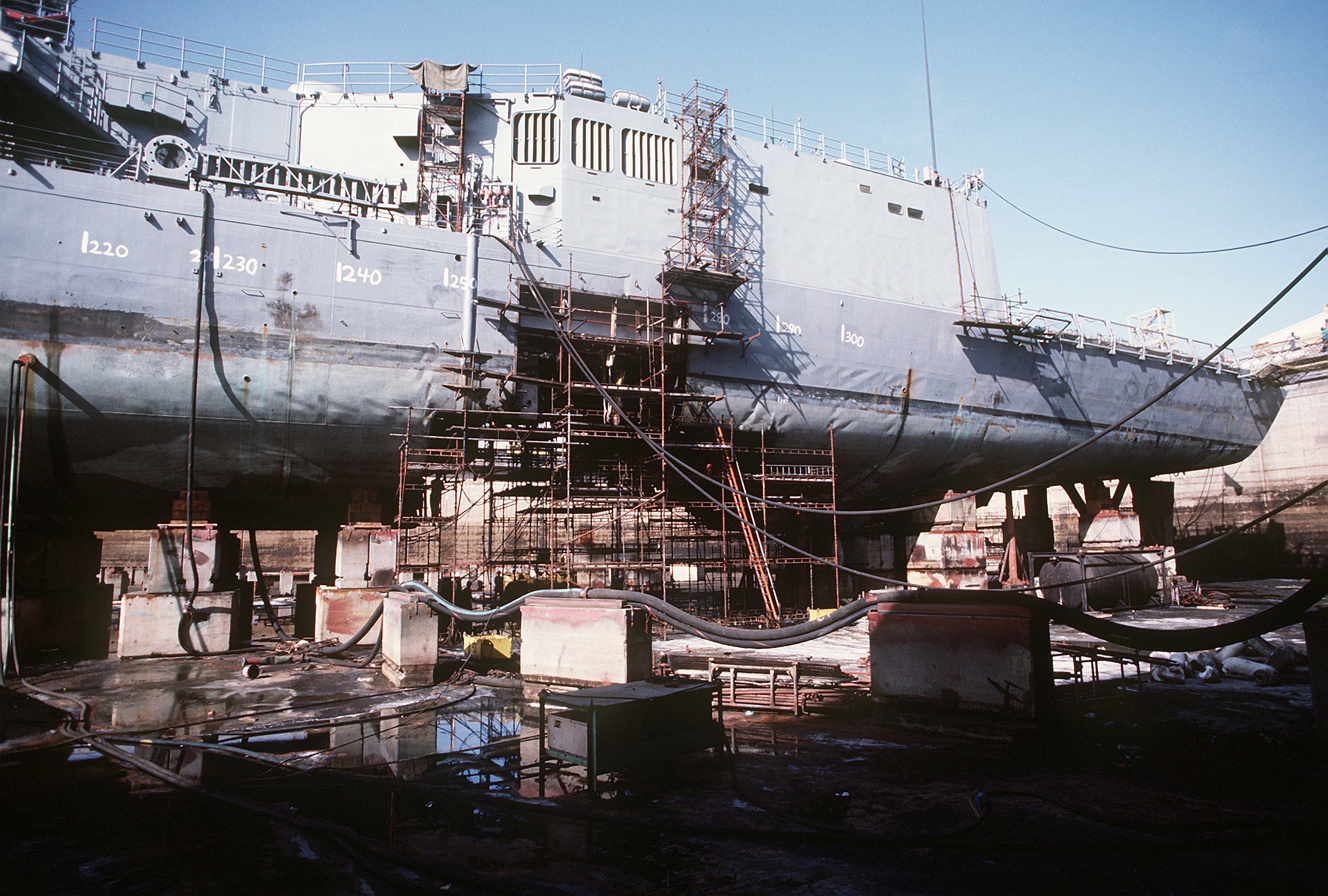
Samuel B. Roberts in a dry dock in Dubai, UAE for temporary repairs.

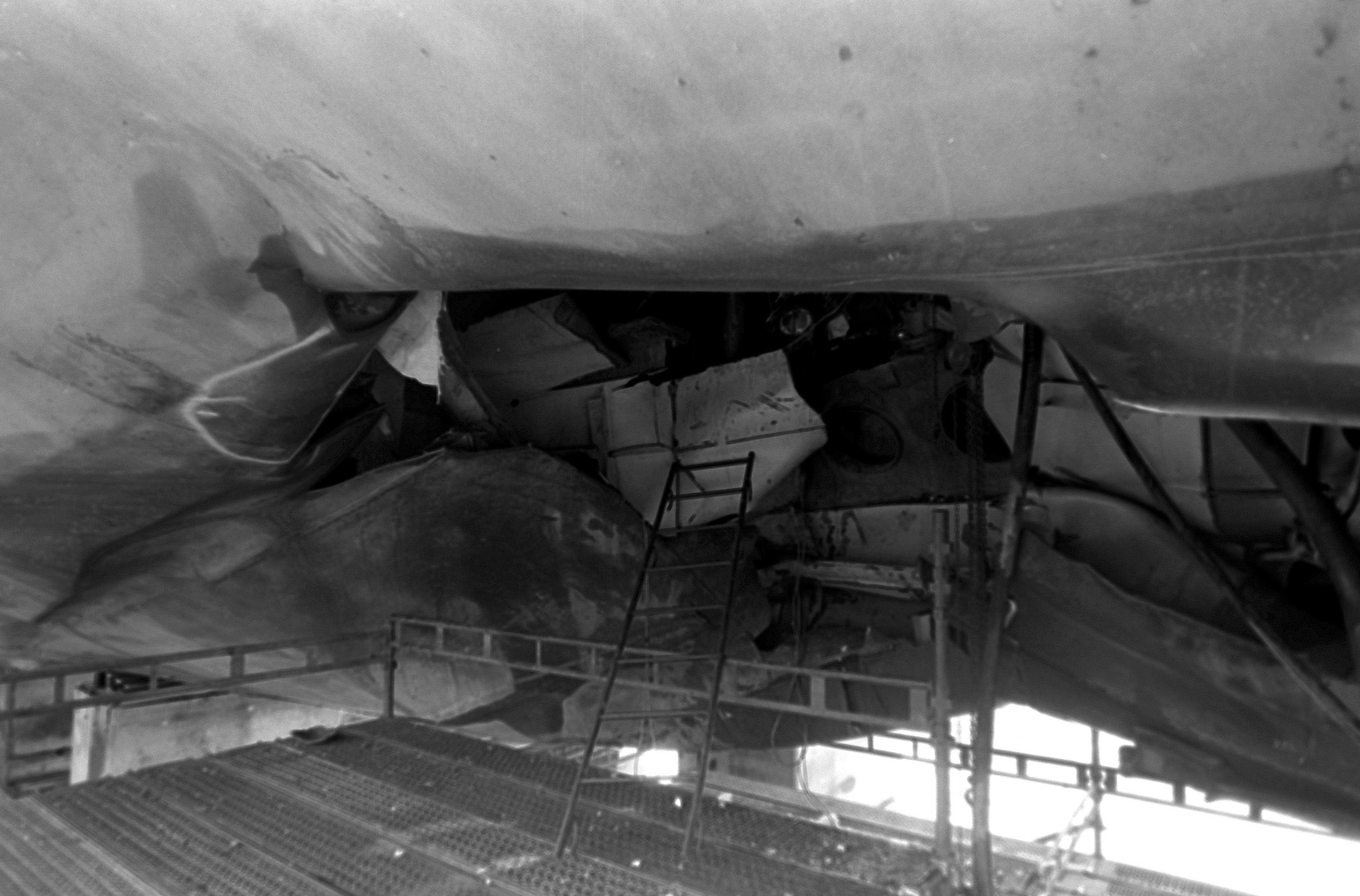
Samuel B. Roberts's damaged hull.

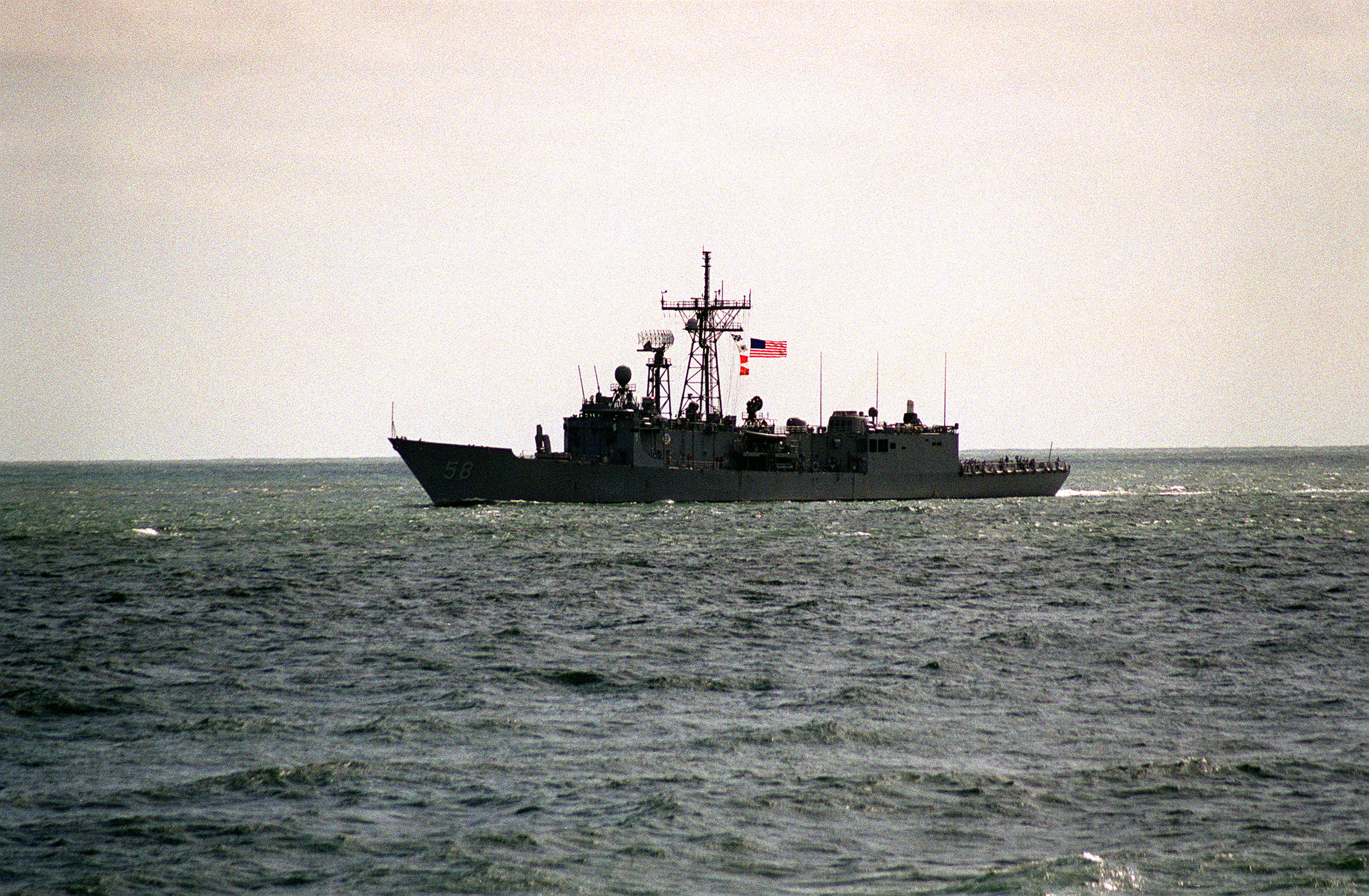
Samuel B. Roberts underway in the Chesapeake Bay, 20 August 1995

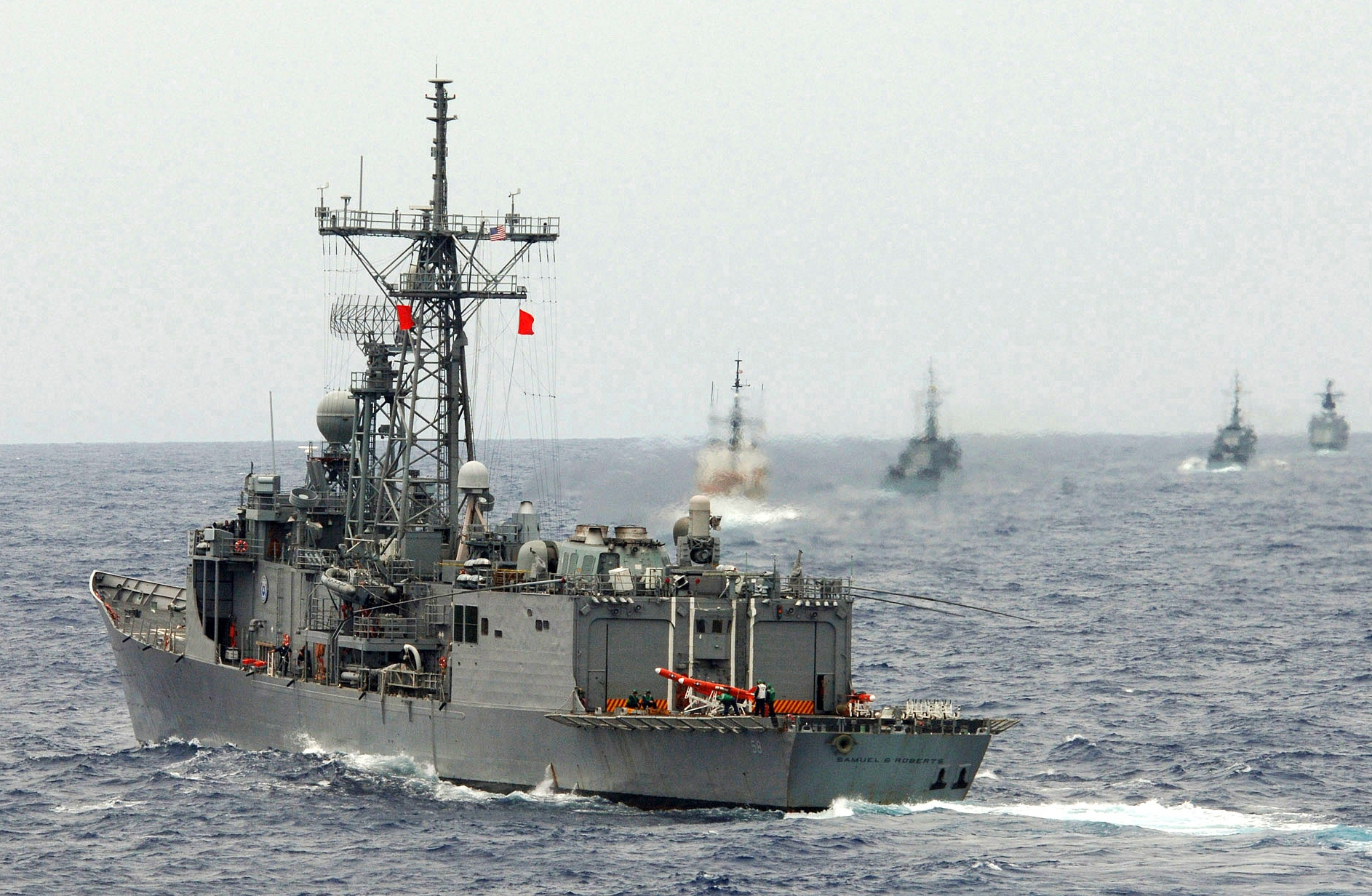
Samuel B. Roberts maneuvers into formation with naval and coast guard forces during UNITAS, 19 July 2005

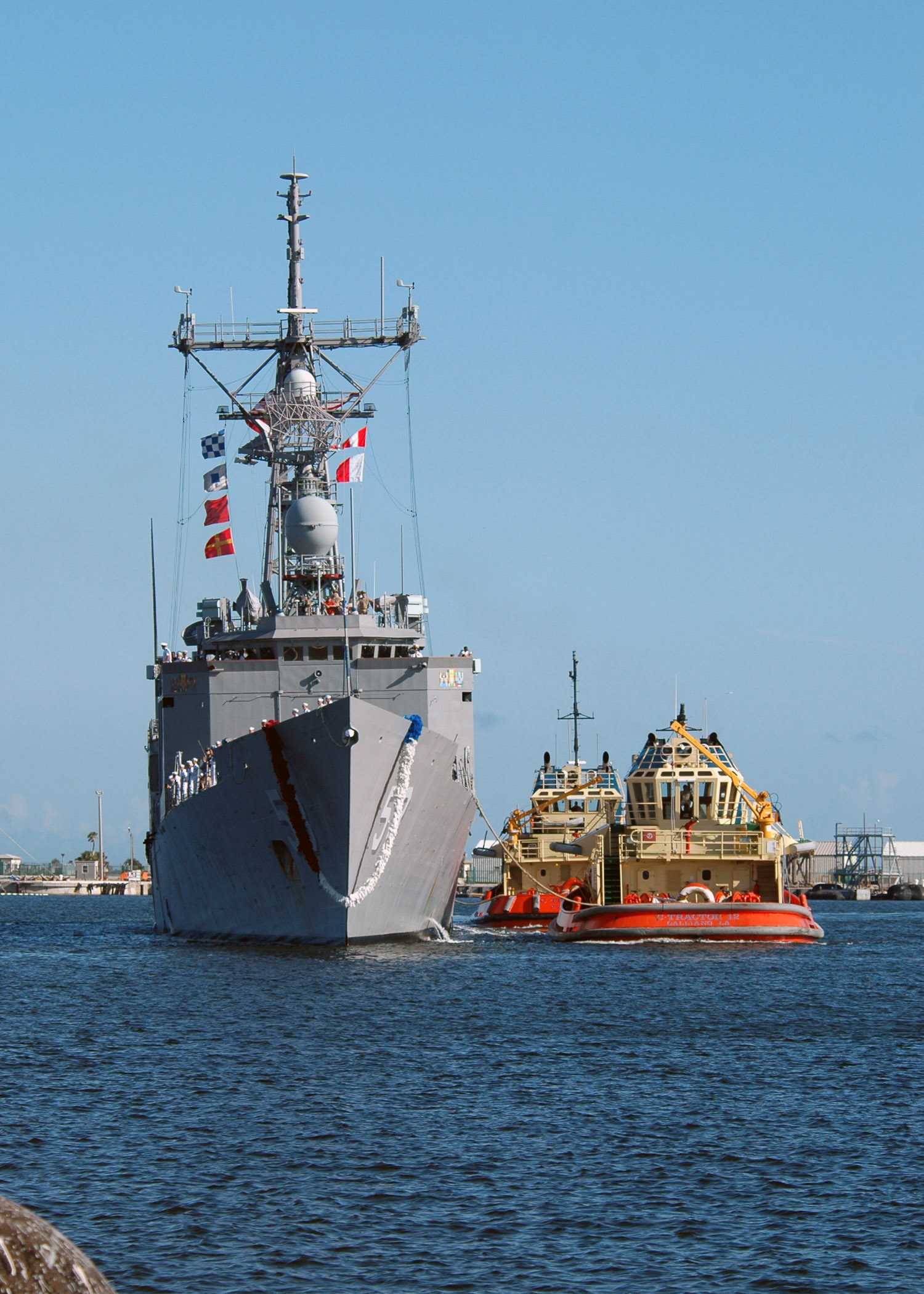
Samuel B. Roberts returns to her homeport in Mayport, 26 September 2007

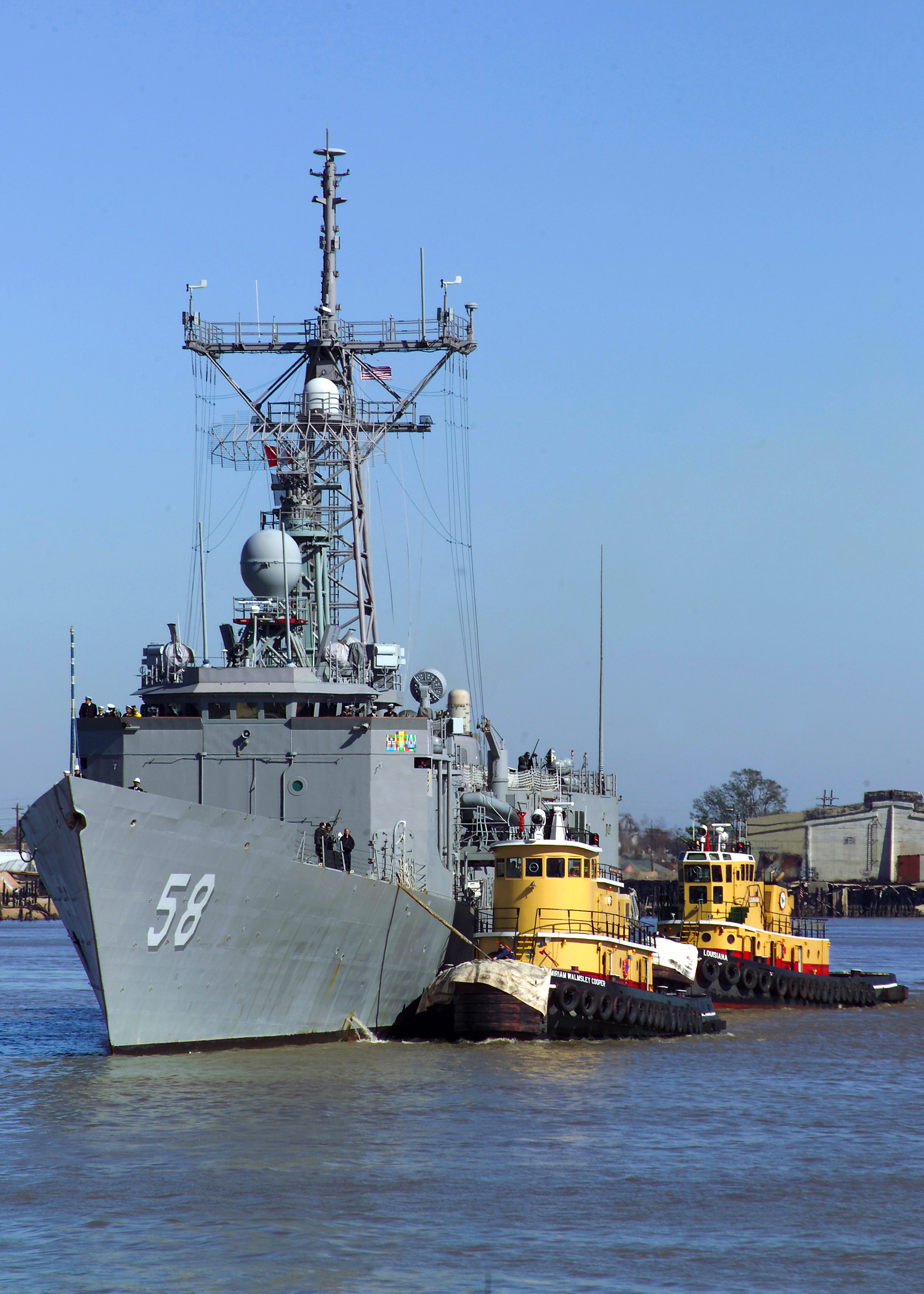
Samuel B. Roberts visits Guantanamo Bay, Cuba, for refueling, 1 April 2009

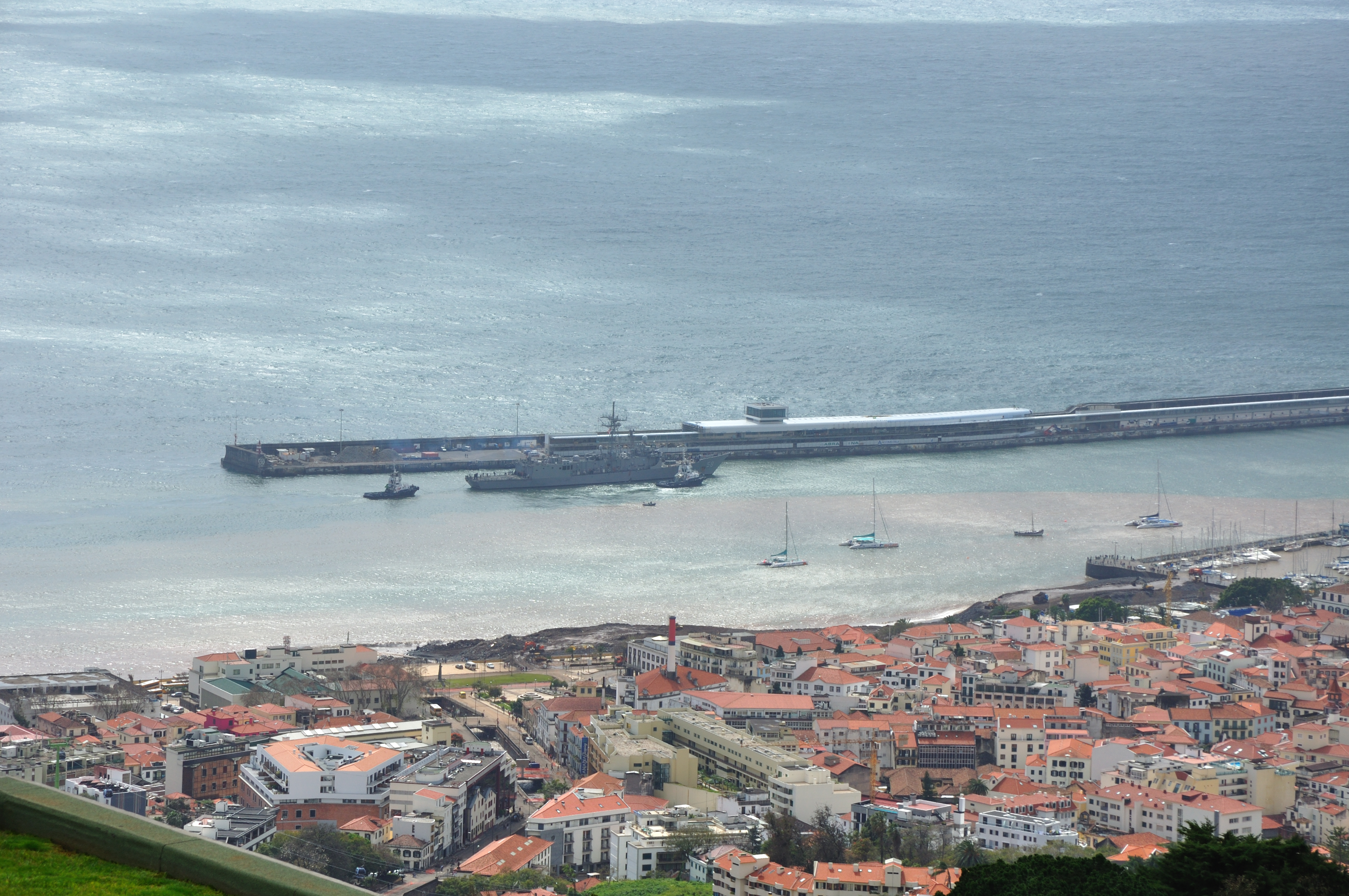
Samuel B. Roberts in Madeira, Portugal, 5 March 2010

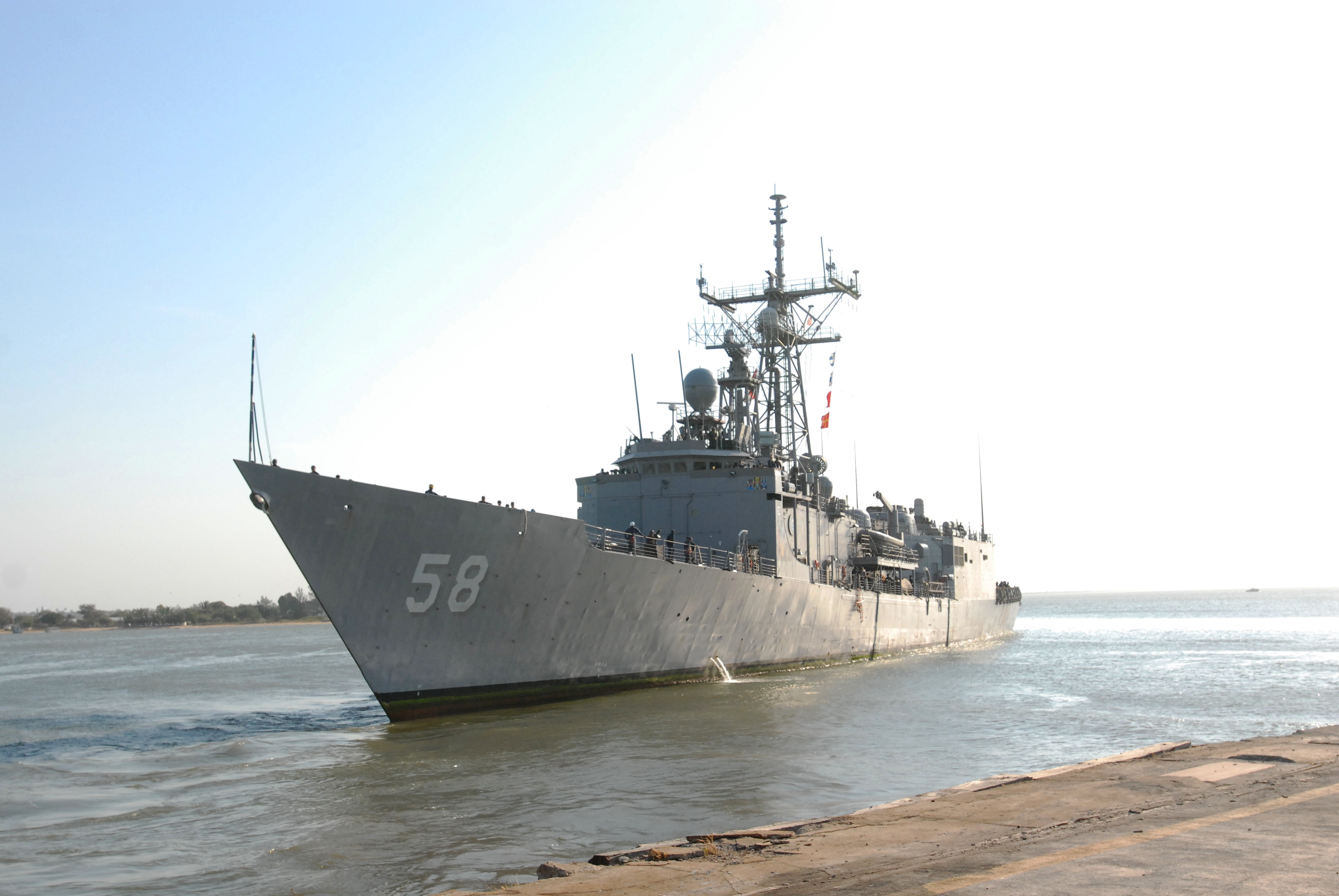
Samuel B. Roberts arrives in Maputo, Mozambique, 26 August 2011

Samuel B. Roberts visits Souda Bay, 19 August 2013

Aboard the flight deck of Samuel B. Roberts, 17 March 2014
