= USS Samuel B. Roberts (DE-413) =

John C. Butler-class destroyer escort (1944–1944)

Coordinates: 11°40′N 126°20′E

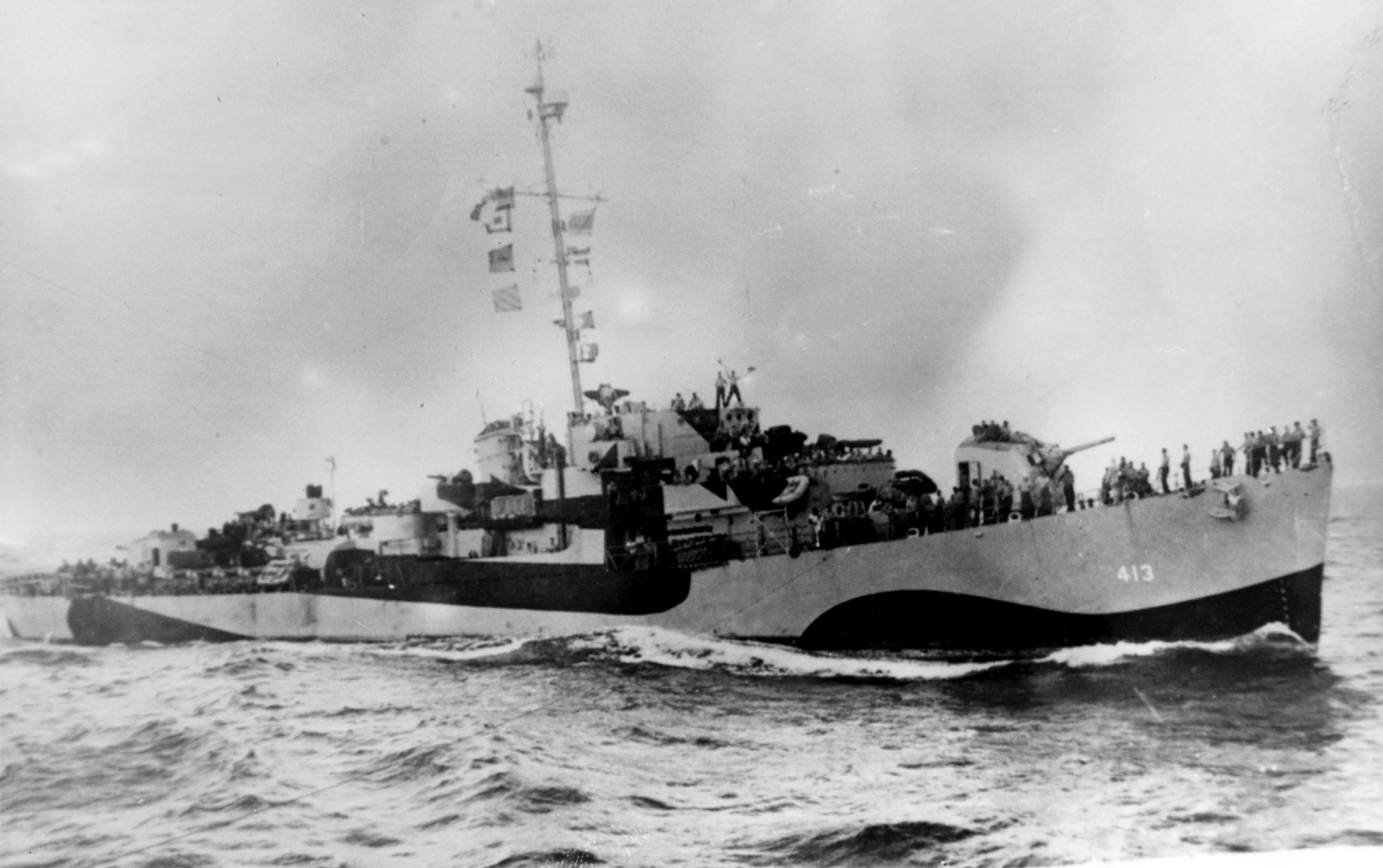
- Samuel B. Roberts at sea, c. October 1944

History

United States
- Name: USS Samuel B. Roberts
- Namesake: Samuel Booker Roberts Jr.
- Builder: Brown Shipbuilding, Houston, Texas
- Laid down: 6 December 1943
- Launched: 20 January 1944
- Commissioned: 28 April 1944
- Honors and awards: 1 Battle Star; Presidential Unit Citation
- Fate: Sunk during the Battle off Samar, 25 October 1944; Shipwreck found, 22 June 2022

General characteristics
- Class & type: John C. Butler-class destroyer escort
- Displacement: 1,350 long tons (1,372 t)
- Length: 306 ft (93 m)
- Beam: 36 ft 8 in (11.18 m)
- Draft: 9 ft 5 in (2.87 m)
- Installed power: 12,000 shp (8,900 kW)
- Propulsion: 2 × geared steam turbines; 2 × boilers; 2 × shafts
- Speed: Designed: 24 kn (28 mph; 44 km/h); Achieved: 28.7 kn (33.0 mph; 53.2 km/h)
- Range: 6,000 nmi (11,000 km; 6,900 mi) @ 12 kn (22 km/h; 14 mph)
- Complement: 14 officers, 201 enlisted
- Sensors & processing systems: SF multi-purpose radar
- Armament: 2 × single 5 in (127 mm) guns; 2 × twin 40 mm (1.6 in) AA guns; 10 × single 20 mm (0.79 in) AA guns; 1 × triple 21 in (533 mm) torpedo tubes; 8 × depth charge throwers; 1 × Hedgehog ASW mortar; 2 × depth charge racks

USS Samuel B. Roberts (DE-413) was a John C. Butler-class destroyer escort of the United States Navy, which served in World War II, the first of three U.S. Navy ships to bear the name.

Samuel B. Roberts was named after Coxswain Samuel Booker Roberts Jr., a Navy Cross recipient, who had been commended for voluntarily steering a Higgins boat towards enemy forces at Guadalcanal to divert fire from evacuation efforts being undertaken by other friendly vessels. The ship was nicknamed the "Sammy B".

Samuel B. Roberts was sunk in the Battle off Samar, in which a small force of U.S. warships prevented a vastly superior Imperial Japanese Navy force from attacking the amphibious invasion fleet off the Philippine island of Leyte. The battle formed part of the larger Battle of Leyte Gulf of October 1944. The ship was part of Task Unit 77.4.3 (Taffy 3), escort carriers only protected by relatively few destroyers and destroyer escorts. Taffy 3 was inadvertently left to fend off a fleet of heavily armed Japanese battleships, cruisers, and destroyers off the island of Samar.

Steaming through incoming shells, Samuel B. Roberts joined Heermann in crippling the heavy cruiser Chikuma with gunfire, depleting almost all of her ammunition. As she withdrew, she was taken under fire by several battleships, with Kongō landing the killing blow. After the battle, Samuel B. Roberts received the appellation "the destroyer escort that fought like a battleship". As of June 2022, she is the deepest shipwreck ever discovered. Her last known survivor died on 20 March 2022.

Of the 224 man crew, 120 survived to be rescued by patrol craft, escorting a group of five landing craft, infantry. During the battle engagement, 89 men were killed and 25 more perished as a result of wounds sustained during the battle or shark attack (a lack of floatation devices and drinking sea water may have also contributed to men lost while awaiting rescue). The survivors spent about 50 hours in the water before being rescued.

== Construction and commissioning ==
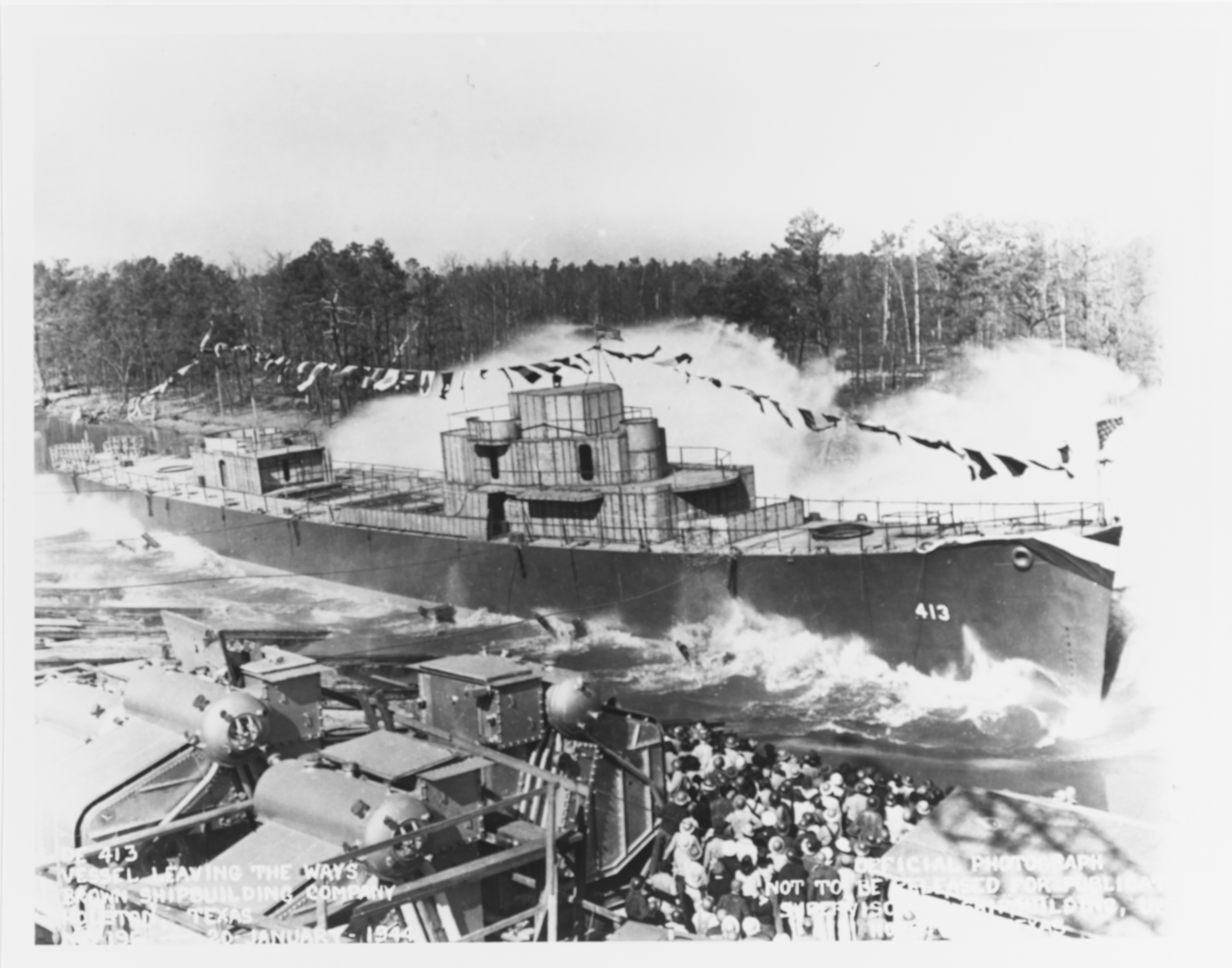
Launch of Samuel B. Roberts on 20 January 1944

Samuel B. Roberts was laid down on 6 December 1943, by the Brown Shipbuilding Company of Houston, Texas. She was launched on 20 January 1944, sponsored by her namesake's mother, Mrs. Anna Roberts. She was commissioned on 28 April 1944, commanded by Lieutenant Commander Robert W. Copeland, USNR.

== Service history ==
Samuel B. Roberts had a shakedown cruise off Bermuda from 21 May to 19 June 1944. After spending time at the Boston Navy Yard, Roberts departed for Norfolk, Virginia, on 7 July. Later that day, the ship presumably struck a whale, which bent her starboard propeller. Repairs were completed by 11 July. Roberts departed Norfolk on 22 July, going through the Panama Canal on 27 July. She joined the Pacific Fleet at Pearl Harbor on 10 August.

She conducted training exercises around the Hawaiian Islands, then steamed out on 21 August with a convoy reaching Eniwetok Atoll on 30 August. On 2 September, Roberts returned to Pearl Harbor, with a convoy arriving on 10 September. Following further training, the destroyer escort got underway on 21 September, escorted a convoy to Eniwetok, and arrived on 30 September.

Roberts next proceeded to Manus Island in the Admiralty Islands of the Southwest Pacific and then joined Task Unit 77.4.3 (Taffy 3). From there, she steamed to Leyte Gulf area off the eastern Philippines. On arrival, she commenced operations with the Northern Air Support Group off the Island of Samar.

=== Battle off Samar ===
Shortly after dawn on 25 October, Samuel B. Roberts was protecting Taffy 3's escort carriers, whose aircraft were supporting the Army assault. The warships were steaming off the eastern coast of Samar when the Japanese Center Force, a 23-ship task force under the command of Vice Admiral Takeo Kurita, appeared on the horizon and opened fire.

Although destroyer escorts were conceived as inexpensive, small ships that could protect slow cargo convoys against submarines, they retained a basic antiship capability with torpedoes and 5-inch (127 mm) guns. USS Samuel B. Roberts (DE-413) distinguished herself in this battle as the "destroyer escort that fought like a battleship" combating armored cruisers (which were designed to withstand 5-inch gunfire). Around 07:40, Lieutenant Commander Robert W. Copeland maneuvered his small ship to evade the charging Heermann; watching that destroyer approach the enemy, Copeland realized his own ship's heading and location put it in a textbook position to launch a torpedo attack at the leading heavy cruiser. Over his ship's 1MC public-address circuit, he told his crew, "This will be a fight against overwhelming odds from which survival cannot be expected. We will do what damage we can." Without orders and indeed against orders, he set course at full speed to follow Heermann in to attack the cruisers.

Under the cover of the smokescreen from the destroyers, Roberts escaped detection. Not wanting to draw attention to his small ship, Copeland repeatedly denied his gun captain permission to open fire with the 5-inch (127 mm) guns; though targets were clearly visible and in range, he intended to launch torpedoes at 2.5 nmi (2.8 mi; 4.6 km). A stray shell, probably intended for one of the nearby destroyers, hit Roberts's mast, which fell and jammed the torpedo mount at 08:00. Finally recovering, at 2.0 nmi (2.3 mi; 3.7 km), Roberts launched her torpedoes at Chōkai without being fired upon. Quickly reversing course, Roberts disappeared into the smoke. A lookout reported at least one torpedo hit, but in reality, the Chōkai was not hit by a torpedo.

By 08:10, Roberts was nearing the carrier formation. Through the smoke and rain, the heavy cruiser Chikuma appeared, firing broadsides at the carriers. Copeland changed course to attack and told his gun captain, "Mr. Burton, you may open fire." Roberts and Chikuma began to trade broadsides. Chikuma now divided her fire between the carriers and Roberts. Hampered by the closing range and slow rate of fire, Chikuma fired with difficulty at her small, fast opponent. (Early in the battle, when it had become apparent that Roberts would have to defend the escort carriers against a surface attack, chief engineer Lt. "Lucky" Trowbridge bypassed all the engine's safety mechanisms, enabling Roberts to go as fast as 28 kn (32 mph; 52 km/h).) Roberts did not share Chikuma's problem of slow rate of fire. For the next 35 minutes, from as close as 2.6 nmi (3.0 mi; 4.8 km), her guns would fire almost her entire supply of 5-inch (127 mm) ammunition on board—over 600 rounds. However, unknown to the crew of Roberts, shortly after Roberts engaged Chikuma, Heermann also aimed her guns at the cruiser.

However, Chikuma was not alone, and soon, the Japanese fleet's multicolored salvos were bracketing Roberts, indicating that she was under fire from the battleships Yamato, Nagato, and Haruna. In a desperate bid to avoid approaching shells, Copeland ordered full back, causing the salvo to miss. Now, however, his small ship was an easy target, and at 08:51, cruiser shells found their mark, damaging one of her boilers. At 17 kn (20 mph; 31 km/h), Roberts began to suffer hits regularly. Credit is given to Kongō for striking the final decisive blows at 09:00, which knocked out her remaining engine. Dead in the water and sinking, Roberts's part in the battle was over.

== Awards and honors ==
Gunner's Mate Third Class Paul Carr

Samuel B. Roberts was included in the Presidential Unit Citation given to Task Unit 77.4.3 "for extraordinary heroism in action." Samuel B. Roberts earned one battle star for her World War II service.

Gunner's Mate Third Class Paul H. Carr was in charge of Gun Mount 52, the aft 5 in (127 mm) gun, which had fired nearly all of its 325 stored rounds in 35 minutes before a round exploded in the gun's breech. Carr was found dying at his station from a severe intestinal wound, begging for help to load the last round he was holding into the breech. For his actions, he was posthumously awarded a Silver Star. A guided-missile frigate, USS Carr (FFG-52), was named for him.

The frigate USS Copeland (FFG-25) was named for the ship's commanding officer.

== Memorials ==
- At the U.S. Naval Academy, in Alumni Hall, a concourse is dedicated to Lieutenant Lloyd Garnett and his shipmates on Samuel B. Roberts, who earned their ship the reputation as the "destroyer escort that fought like a battleship" in the Battle of Leyte Gulf.
- Within Fort Rosecrans National Cemetery federal military cemetery in the city of San Diego, California, a large granite memorial was dedicated in 1995 to Samuel B. Roberts, and to the two U.S. destroyers also sunk in the action, Hoel and Johnston.

== Successors ==
Two later U.S. warships have borne the name USS Samuel B. Roberts:

- The second Samuel B. Roberts (DD-823) was a Gearing-class destroyer commissioned in 1946 and struck in 1970.
- The third Samuel B. Roberts (FFG-58) is an Oliver Hazard Perry-class guided-missile frigate commissioned in 1986 and decommissioned on 22 May 2015.

== Discovery of wreck ==
An exploration team led by Victor Vescovo and made up of personnel of Caladan Oceanic, Deep Ocean Search, and EYOS Expeditions discovered the wreck of Samuel B. Roberts in June 2022. The team found, identified, and surveyed the wreck during a series of six dives conducted from 17 to 24 June 2022.

The team determined that the wreck reached the seabed in one piece, although it hit the seafloor bow first and with enough force to cause some buckling, and observed that the ship's stern had separated from the rest of the hull by about 16 ft (4.9 m). The team reported that it had found evidence of damage to the ship inflicted by a Japanese battleship shell, including Samuel B. Roberts's fallen mast.

The wreck of Samuel B. Roberts lies at a depth of 3,770 fathoms (4.28 mi; 22,620 ft; 6,890 m) in the Philippine Trench, making her the world's deepest known shipwreck and the deepest shipwreck ever identified by a crewed submersible. It exceeds the previous record of 3,538 fathoms (21,228 ft; 4.020 mi; 6,470 m), set in March 2021 when Vescovo's team found and identified the wreck of the destroyer USS Johnston, which was sunk in the same battle.

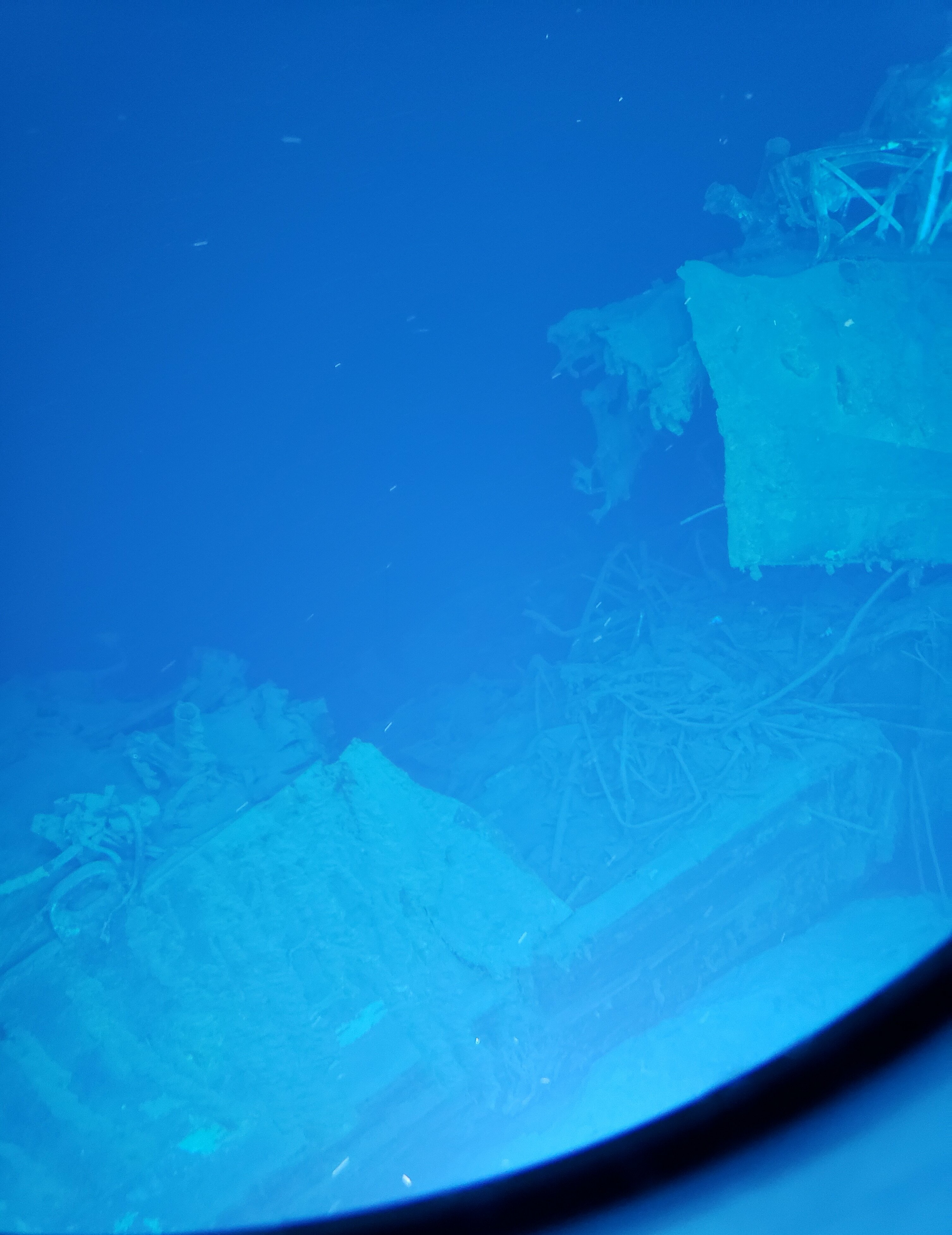
Broken stern section

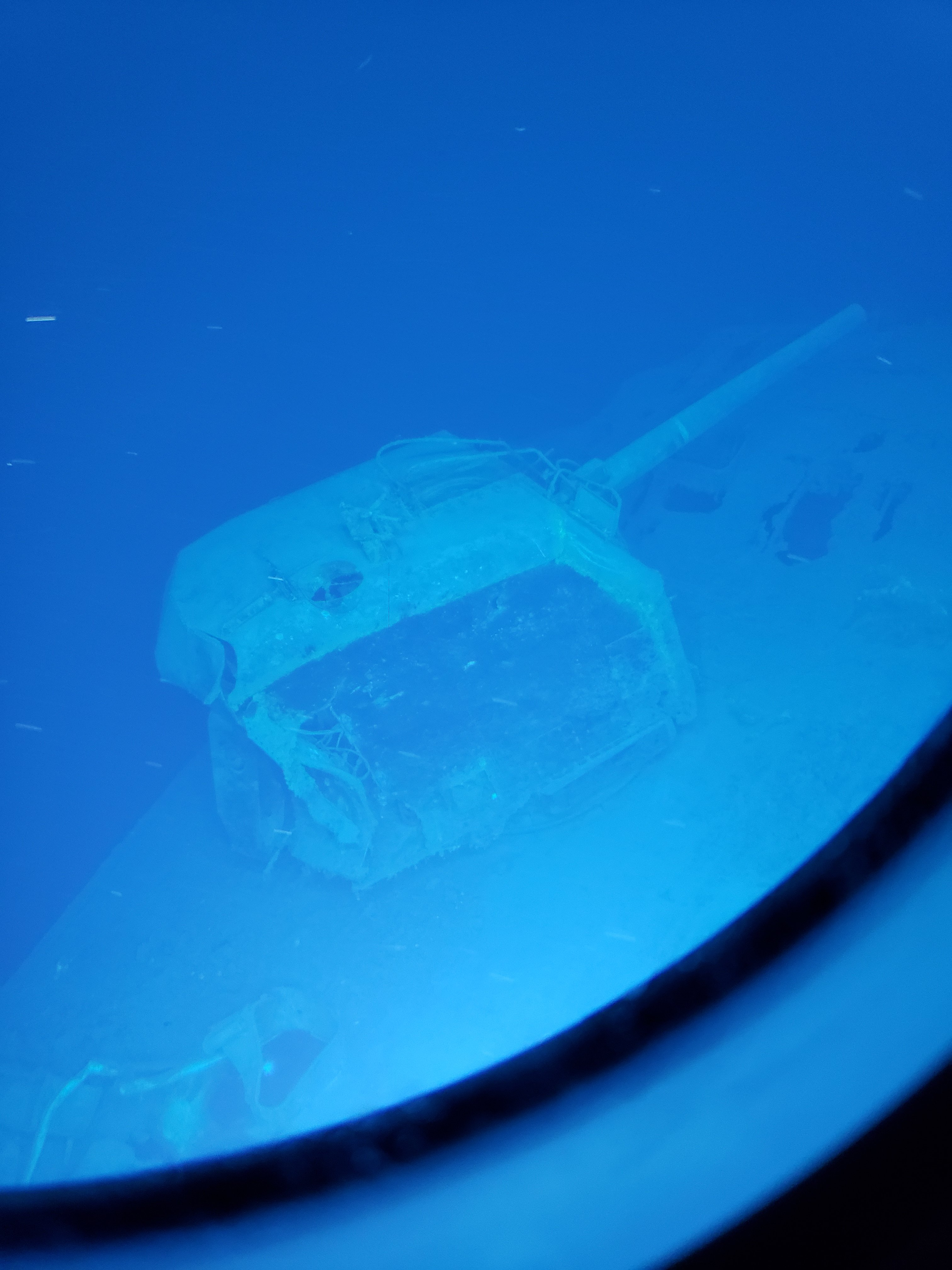
Aft 5" gun mount

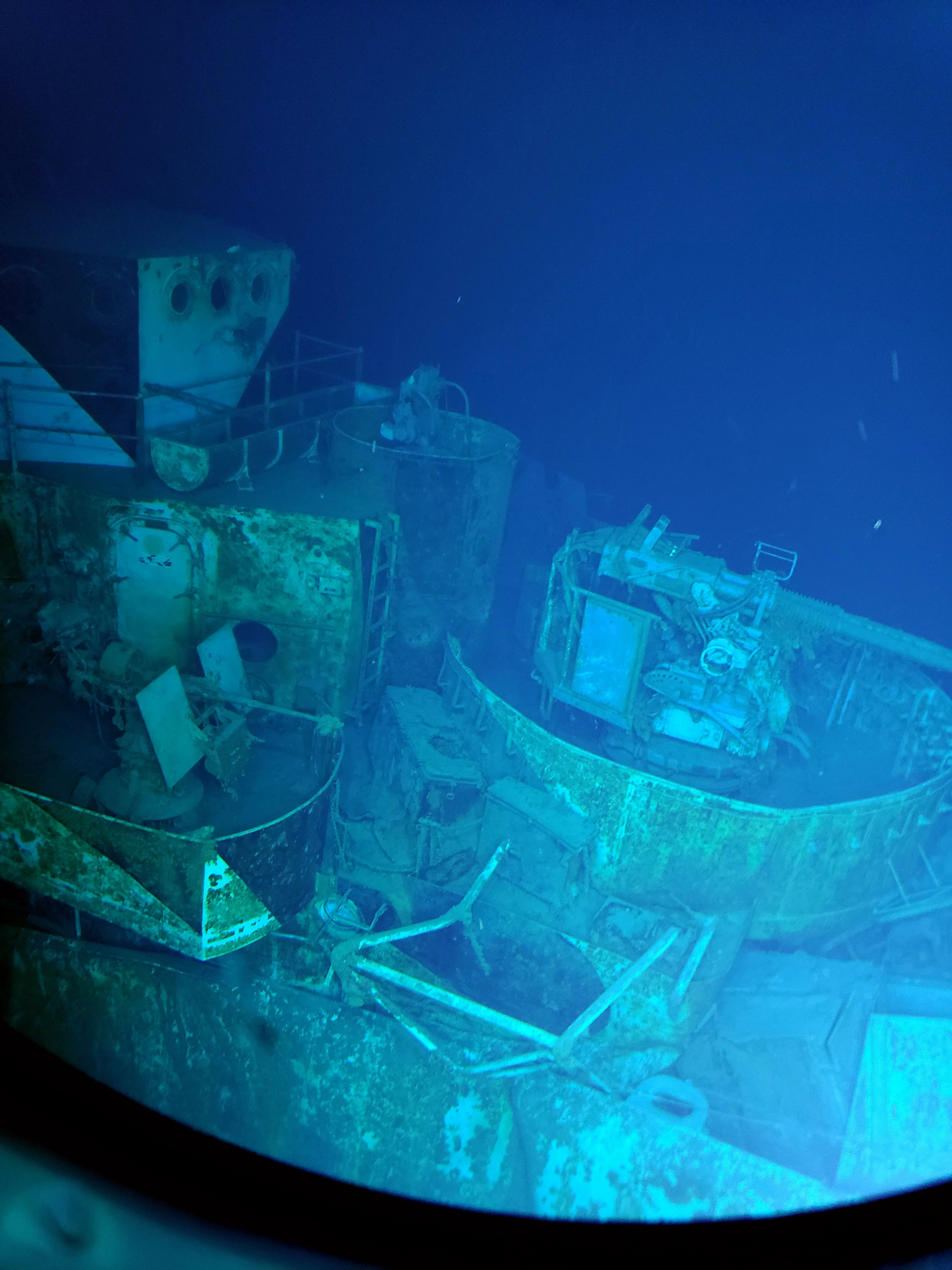
Pilot house and 40 mm gun mount

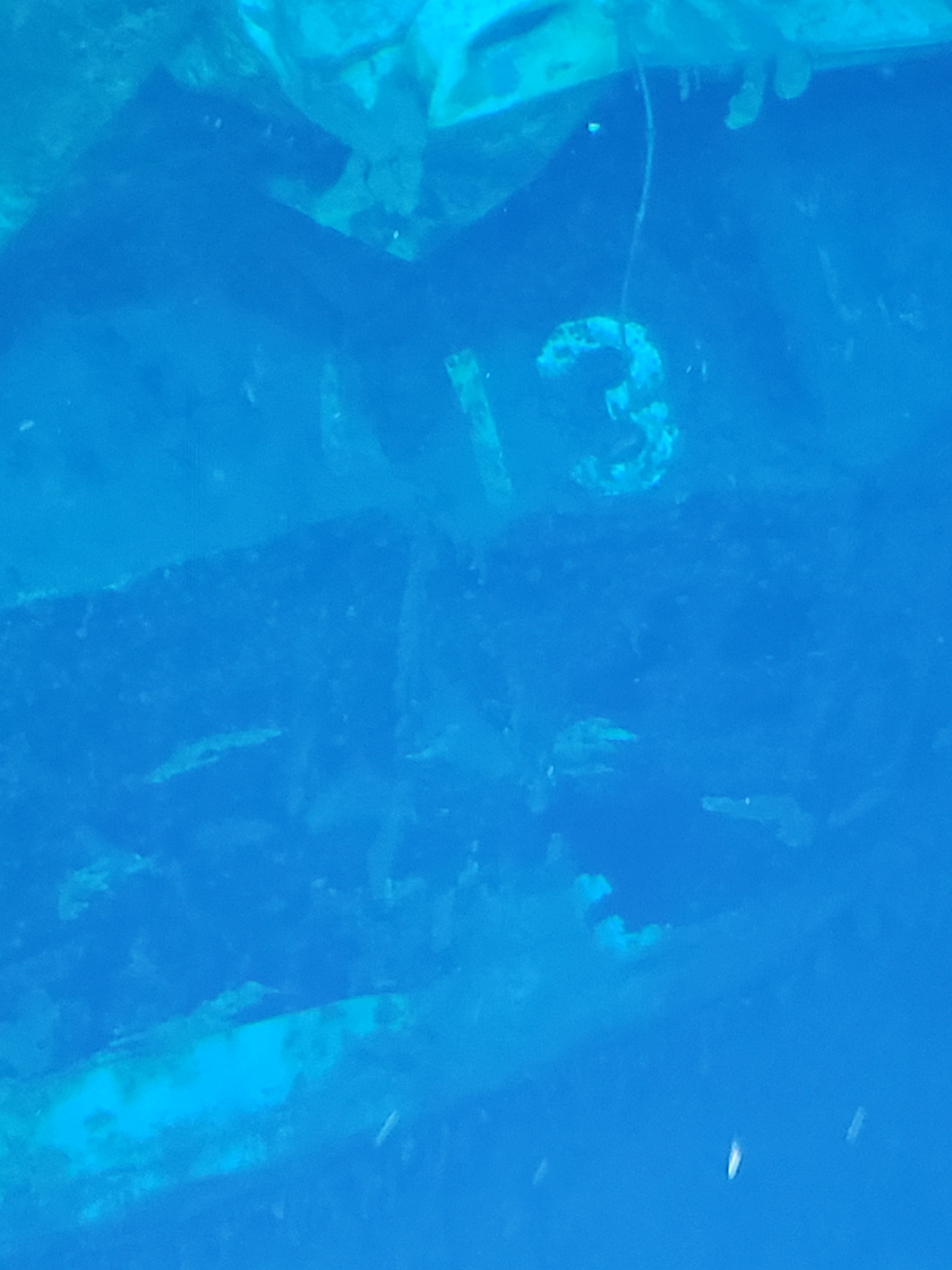
Hull number 413 still visible

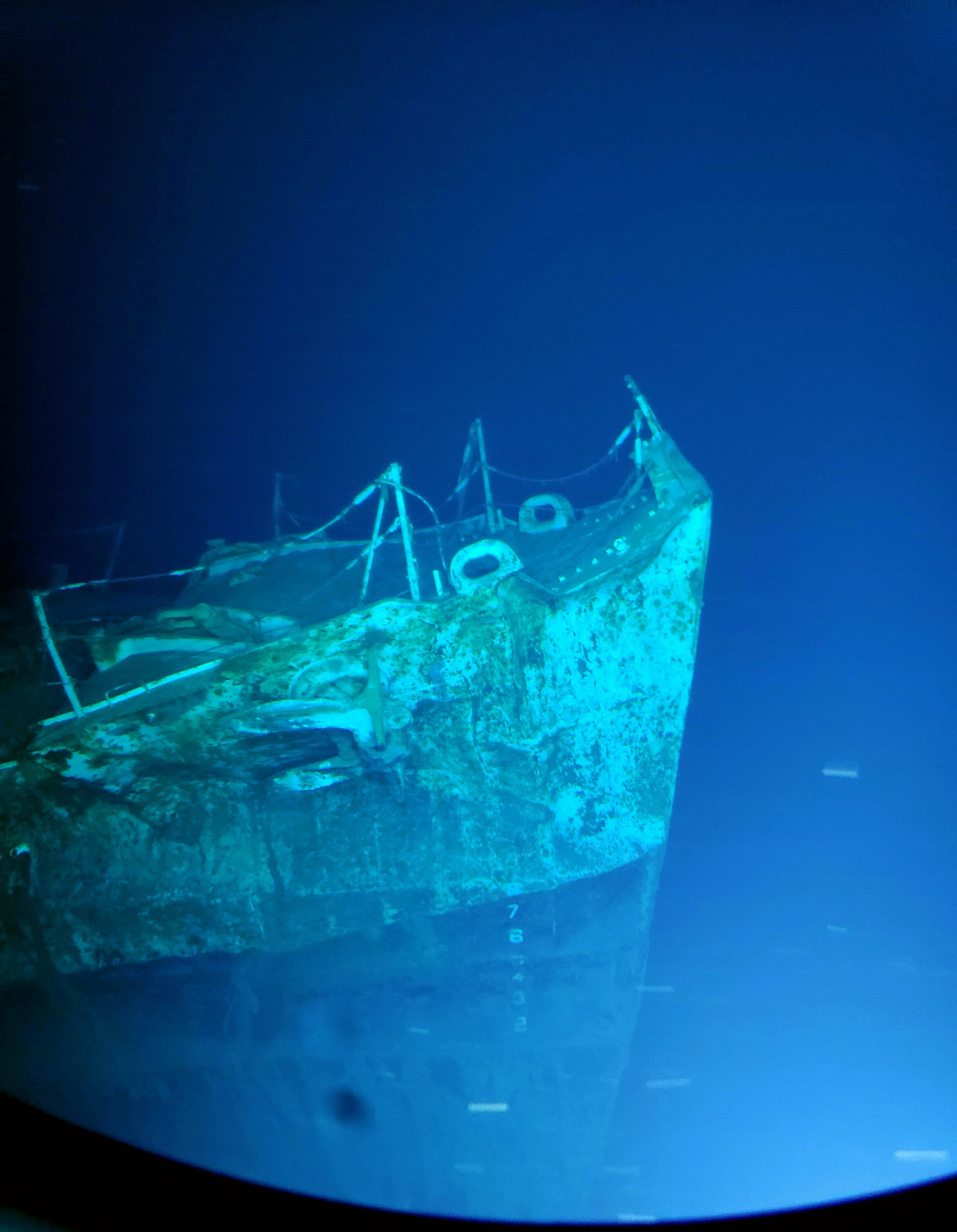
Bow

== Sunken ship protection ==
The wreck of Samuel B. Roberts is protected from unauthorized disturbance by the Sunken Military Craft Act. A permit for archaeological, historical, or educational purposes can be requested from the Naval History and Heritage Command.
