= Samuel B. Roberts =

Recipient of the Navy Cross (1921–1942)

Samuel Booker Roberts Jr. (12 May 1921 – 27 September 1942) was a U.S. Navy coxswain who was killed in the Battle of Guadalcanal, and became the namesake of three U.S. Navy warships.

Roberts was born in San Francisco, California, on 12 May 1921. He enlisted in the U.S. Naval Reserve in 1939 and was called to active duty in 1940. Roberts served aboard the USS California (BB-44) and the transport USS Heywood (AP-12), before being transferred to the cargo transport USS Bellatrix (AK-20, later AKA-20).

In 1942, Bellatrix was assigned to Task Group Four and became part of the Guadalcanal Assault Force. As a coxswain for the Bellatrix's assault boats, Roberts helped ferry supplies from the transport ships to a tenuous beachhead.

After the ships withdrew in the face of Japanese attacks that began 7 August 1942, Roberts volunteered for duty on the island of Guadalcanal, where he was attached to a beachmaster unit at Lunga Point. The unit, which included Navy and United States Coast Guard sailors, transported Marines and their supplies to beaches along the island's northern coast, and also evacuated wounded Marines.

Early on the morning of 27 September 1942, Roberts volunteered for a rescue mission to save a company-size unit of Marines that had been surrounded by a larger Japanese force. The rescue group of several Higgins boats was taken under heavy fire and was perilously close to failure. Roberts volunteered to distract Japanese forces by guiding his boat directly in front of their lines, drawing their fire. This decoy act was performed effectively until all Marines had been evacuated. However, as he was about to withdraw from the range of the Japanese guns, Roberts’ boat was hit and he was mortally wounded. His boatmates brought him back to base and he was flown out on a medical evacuation flight, but died the next day.

Roberts was awarded the Navy Cross for his valor in the face of enemy fire.

== Warships named for Roberts ==
- DE-413, a John C. Butler-class destroyer escort, commissioned in April 1944 and sunk on 25 October in the Battle off Samar. Roberts' younger brother, Jack, served aboard DE-413 and was the "voice" of the Samuel B. Roberts on the ship's intercom. He survived the ship's sinking at Samar.
- DD-823, a Gearing-class destroyer, commissioned in 1946 and struck in 1970.
- FFG-58, an Oliver Hazard Perry-class guided missile frigate, commissioned in 1986 and decommissioned in 2015. She survived an explosion from an Iranian mine in the Persian Gulf in 1988. The blast also broke the keel of the ship; such structural damage is almost always fatal to most vessels. The crew fought fire and flooding for five hours and saved the ship.

== Other honors ==
In 2009, the U.S. Navy named a damage control trainer at Joint Base Pearl Harbor-Hickam in Hawaii after FFG-58. It trains sailors to fight shipboard flooding of the sort the frigate faced after striking a mine in 1988.
