= Robert W. Copeland =

United States Navy officer (1910–1973)

Robert Witcher Copeland
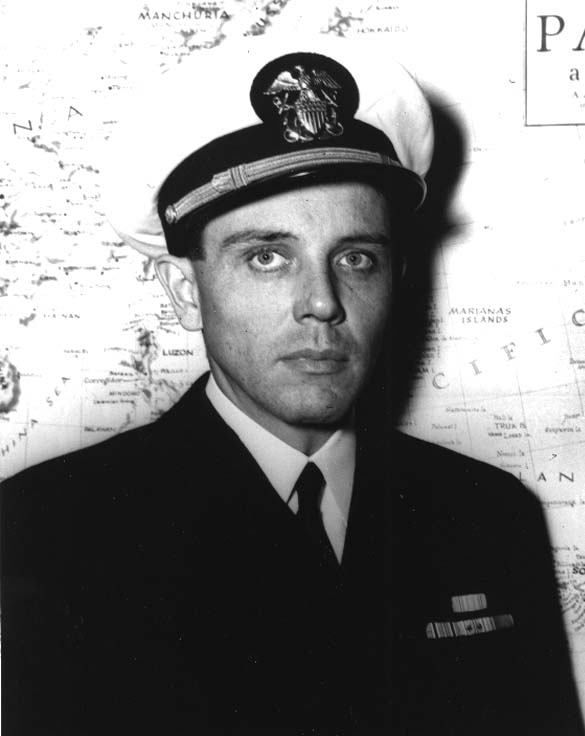
- Robert W. Copeland circa 1944
- Born: September 9, 1910; Tacoma, Washington
- Died: August 25, 1973 (aged 62); Tacoma, Washington
- Military career
- Allegiance: United States of America
- Branch: United States Naval Reserve
- Rank: Rear Admiral
- Units: "Taffy 3"
- Commands: Samuel B. Roberts (DE-413)
- Conflicts: Battle off Samar
- Awards: Navy Cross; Presidential Unit Citation; American Defense Medal; Asiatic-Pacific Campaign Medal; World War II Victory Medal; Philippine Liberation Medal

Rear Admiral Robert Witcher Copeland (September 9, 1910 – August 25, 1973) was a United States Navy officer who served during World War II.

== Early life and military career ==
Copeland was born in Tacoma, Washington. Enlisted in the Naval Reserve in 1929, he was commissioned as a Naval Reserve officer in 1935. Copeland practiced law from 1935 until 1940, when he was ordered to active duty during the Navy's pre-World War II expansion. During the war, he commanded Pawtucket (YT-7), Black Douglas (PYc-45), Wyman (DE-38), and Samuel B. Roberts (DE-413).

=== Battle off Samar ===
During the Battle off Samar, October 25, 1944, while commanding Samuel B. Roberts, a destroyer escort armed with two five-inch guns and weighing only 1,350 tonnes (1,330 long tons), Lieutenant Commander Copeland led his ship and crew in an attack on a superior Japanese battleship and cruiser force, together with three US destroyers (USS Johnston, USS Hoel, USS Heermann) and three other destroyer escorts (USS Dennis, USS John C. Butler, USS Raymond).

The Japanese force consisted of four battleships, six heavy cruisers, two light cruisers and eleven destroyers, commanded by Vice Admiral Takeo Kurita. One of the four Japanese battleships was the Japanese battleship Yamato, the heaviest and most powerfully armed battleship ever constructed, displacing nearly 72,000 tonnes (71,000 long tons) at full load and armed with nine 46 cm (18.1 in) Type 94 main guns, the largest guns ever mounted on a warship. The other three Japanese battleships consisted of the Nagato and the two fast battleships Kongo and Haruna. Due to the small size of the Samuel B. Roberts it was difficult for the Japanese battleships to target her, but despite evasive maneuvers and expending all of her torpedoes, the Samuel B. Roberts was eventually hit and sunk.

Though his ship was lost in the battle, the action helped defeat the Japanese counter-offensive against the Leyte invasion. For this, Copeland was awarded the Navy Cross, and shared the Presidential Unit Citation with the rest of Task Unit 77.4.3. After his ship was crippled by 14-inch shells from a Japanese battleship and ordered abandoned, Copeland managed to survive for two days on a life raft before being rescued. Of the 224-man crew aboard the USS Samuel B. Roberts, 120 sailors survived. Those who survived spent over fifty hours in the water.

According to the action report of the USS Samuel B. Roberts; "The crew were informed over the loud speaker system at the beginning of the action, of the Commanding Officer's estimate of the situation, that is, a fight against overwhelming odds from which survival could not be expected, during which time we would do what damage we could. In the face of this knowledge the men zealously manned their stations wherever they might be, and fought and worked with such calmness, courage and efficiency that no higher honor could be conceived than to command such a group of men."

== Post-World War II ==
Following World War II, Copeland resumed his law career while remaining a member of the Naval Reserve, in which he rose to the rank of Rear Admiral. Robert W. Copeland died at Tacoma, Washington, on August 25, 1973.

In 1980, the frigate USS Copeland (FFG-25) was named for him.

== Awards ==

Navy Cross		Purple Heart
Naval Reserve Medal w/ one 3/16" bronze star	Navy Presidential Unit Citation w/ one 3/16" bronze star	American Defense Service Medal
American Campaign Medal	Asiatic-Pacific Campaign Medal w/ two 3/16" bronze stars	World War II Victory Medal
Armed Forces Reserve Medal	Philippine Presidential Unit Citation	Philippine Liberation Medal w/ one 3/16" bronze star

=== Navy Cross citation ===

Lieutenant Commander Robert Witcher Copeland
U.S. Navy
Date Of Action: October 25, 1944
The President of the United States of America takes pleasure in presenting the Navy Cross to Lieutenant Commander Robert Witcher Copeland, United States Naval Reserve, for extraordinary heroism and distinguished service in the line of his profession as Commanding Officer of the Destroyer Escort U.S.S. SAMUEL B. ROBERTS (DE-413), in a surface action with a large task force of the Japanese Fleet off the Island of Samar, in Philippine waters, during the Battle of Leyte Gulf on 25 October 1944. Against an enemy force vastly superior in numbers, armament and armor, with cool deliberation Lieutenant Commander Copeland closed to within 4,000 yards of a heavy cruiser to deliver a torpedo attack on the rapidly advancing enemy who had taken him under fire from their large caliber guns. By his heroic action, he thus diverted enemy fire to himself from the almost defenseless vessels which he was protecting. Although his ship was lost in this engagement, his heroic actions were instrumental in turning back, sorely crippled, a vastly superior enemy force. His extraordinary courage and magnificent fighting spirit in the face of terrific odds will live forever in the memory of the officers and men who served with him that day. His conduct was in keeping with the highest traditions of the Navy of the United States.

== Further information ==
=== Books ===
- Doscher, J. Henry Jr. (1996). Little Wolf at Leyte: The Story of the Heroic USS Samuel B. Roberts (DE-413) in the Battle of Leyte Gulf during World War II. Austin: Eakins Press.
- Hornfischer, James D. (2004). The Last Stand of the Tin Can Sailors: The Extraordinary WWII Story of the U.S. Navy's Finest Hour. New York: Bantam Books.
- Thomas, Evan (2006). Sea of Thunder: Four Commanders and the Last Great Naval Campaign 1941-1945. New York: Simon & Schuster.
- Wukovits, John (2013). For Crew and Country: The Inspirational True Story of Bravery and Sacrifice Aboard the USS Samuel B. Roberts. New York: St. Martin's Press.
