= USS Copeland =

1980 Oliver Hazard Perry-class frigate

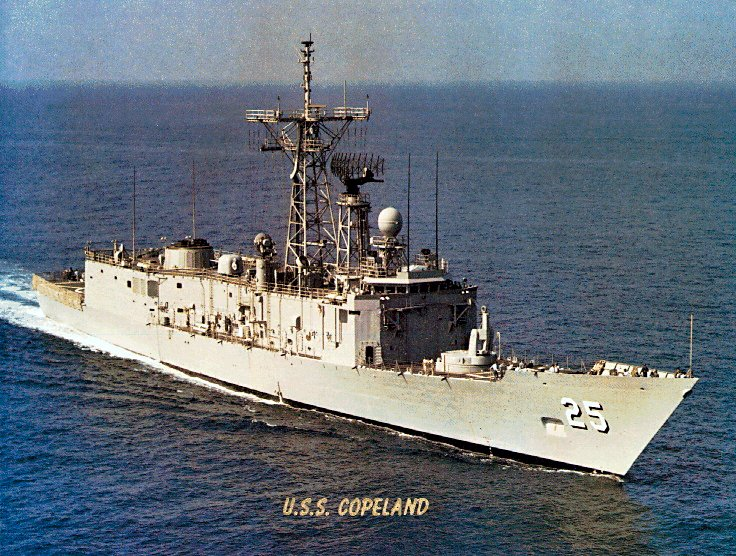
- USS Copeland (FFG-25)

History

United States
- Name: Copeland
- Namesake: Rear Admiral Robert W. Copeland
- Ordered: 28 February 1977
- Builder: Todd Pacific Shipyards, Los Angeles Division, San Pedro, California
- Laid down: 24 October 1979
- Launched: 26 July 1980
- Commissioned: 7 August 1982
- Decommissioned: 18 September 1996
- Stricken: 18 September 1996
- Home port: San Diego, California
- Identification: Hull symbol:FFG-25; Code letters:NRWC
- Motto: "Force For Peace"
- Fate: transferred to Egyptian Navy, 18 September 1996
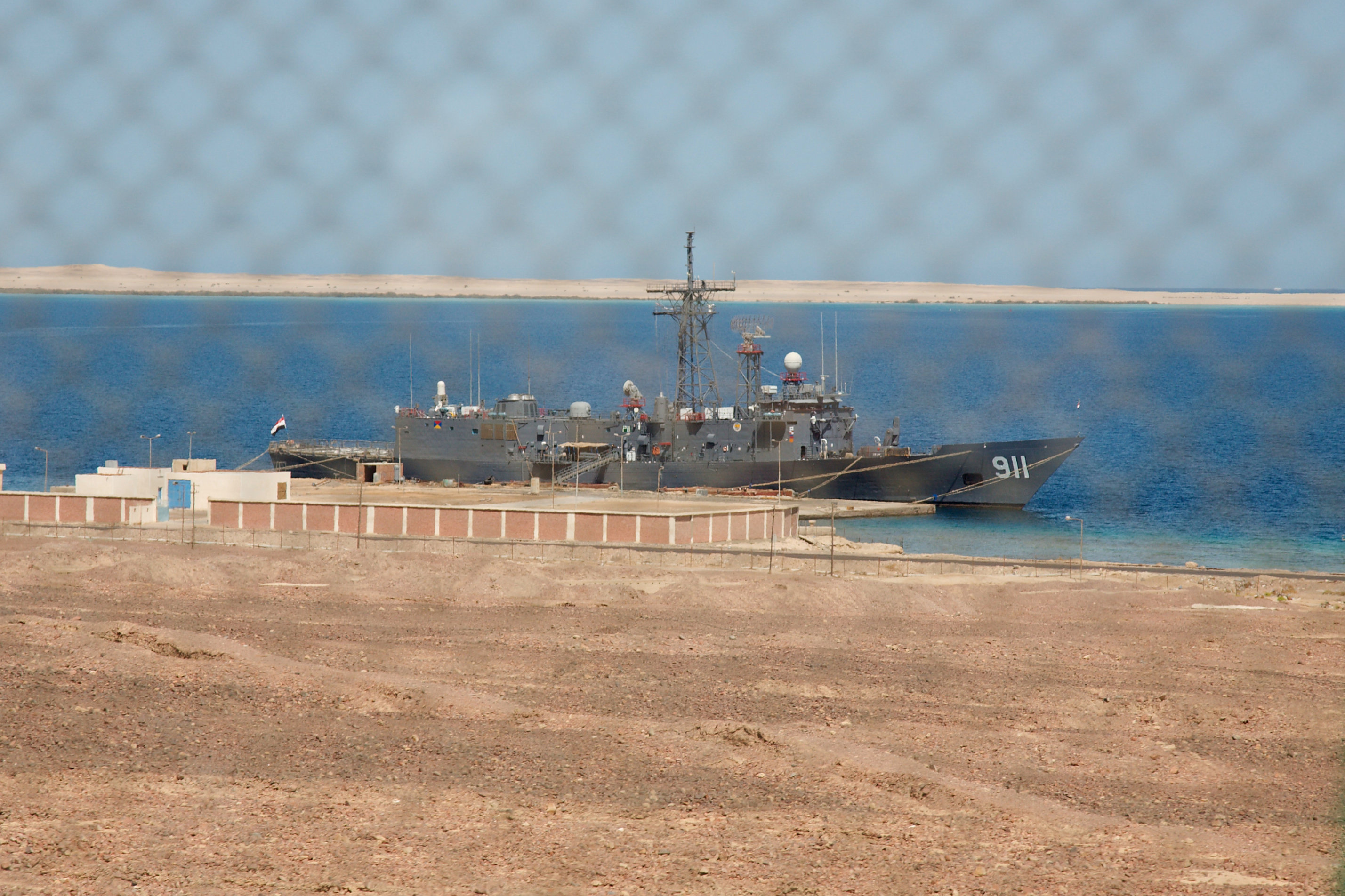
- Mubarak (F911)

Egypt
- Name: Mubarak
- Namesake: Former Egyptian President Hosni Mubarak; City of Alexandria, Egypt
- Acquired: 18 September 1996
- Commissioned: 13 July 1997
- Renamed: Alexandria, 2011
- Identification: F911
- Status: in active service, as of 2023

General characteristics
- Class & type: Oliver Hazard Perry-class frigate
- Displacement: 4,100 long tons (4,200 t), full load
- Length: 445 feet (136 m), overall
- Beam: 45 feet (14 m)
- Draft: 22 feet (6.7 m)
- Propulsion: 2 × General Electric LM2500-30 gas turbines generating 41,000 shp (31 MW) through a single shaft and variable pitch propeller; 2 × Auxiliary Propulsion Units, 350 hp (260 kW) retractable electric azimuth thrusters for maneuvering and docking.
- Speed: over 29 knots (54 km/h)
- Range: 5,000 nautical miles at 18 knots (9,300 km at 33 km/h)
- Complement: 15 officers and 190 enlisted, plus SH-60 LAMPS detachment of roughly six officer pilots and 15 enlisted maintainers
- Sensors & processing systems: AN/SPS-49 air-search radar; AN/SPS-55 surface-search radar; CAS and STIR fire-control radar; AN/SQS-56 sonar.
- Electronic warfare & decoys: AN/SLQ-32
- Armament: As built: 1 × OTO Melara Mk 75 76 mm/62 caliber naval gun; 2 × Mk 32 triple-tube (324 mm) launchers for Mark 46 torpedoes; 1 × Vulcan Phalanx CIWS; 4 × .50-cal (12.7 mm) machine guns.; 1 × Mk 13 Mod 4 single-arm launcher for Harpoon anti-ship missiles and SM-1MR Standard anti-ship/air missiles (40 round magazine); Note: As of 2004, Mk 13 systems removed from all active US vessels of this class.
- Aircraft carried: 1 × SH-2F LAMPS I

USS Copeland (FFG-25) was the 17th ship of the Oliver Hazard Perry class of guided-missile frigates in the United States Navy. She was named for Rear Admiral Robert W. Copeland (1910–1973).

Ordered from Todd Pacific Shipyards, Los Angeles Division, San Pedro, California, on 28 February 1977 as part of the FY77 program, Copeland was laid down on 24 October 1979, launched on 26 July 1980, and commissioned on 7 August 1982. Decommissioned and stricken on 18 September 1996, she was transferred to Egypt the same day as Mubarak (F911). After the 2011 revolution, the ship was renamed to remove the former ruler's name. The ship is named Alexandria (F911) now. As of 2023, she remained in active service with the Egyptian Navy.

Copeland was the first ship of that name in the U.S. Navy.
