= USS Samuel B. Roberts (DD-823) =

Gearing-class destroyer, sunk as a target

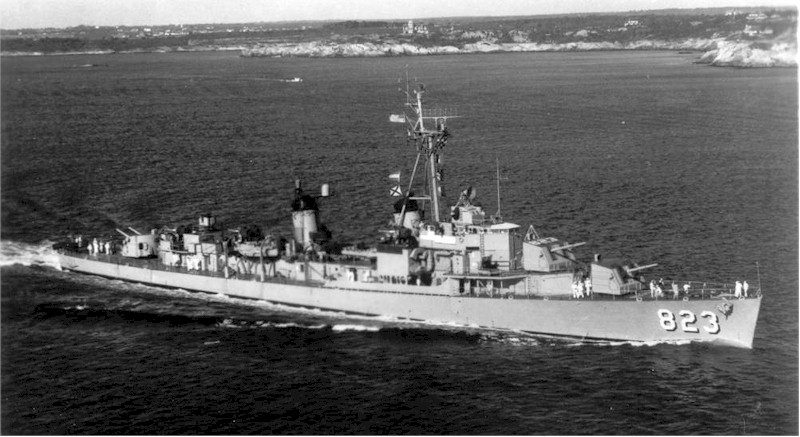
- USS Samuel B. Roberts

History

United States
- Name: USS Samuel B. Roberts
- Namesake: Samuel B. Roberts
- Builder: Consolidated Steel Corporation, Orange, Texas
- Laid down: 27 June 1945
- Launched: 30 November 1945
- Commissioned: 22 December 1946
- Decommissioned: 2 November 1970
- Stricken: 2 November 1970
- Identification: Callsign: NAYO; Hull number: DD-823
- Fate: Sunk as a target, 14 November 1971

General characteristics
- Class & type: Gearing-class destroyer
- Displacement: 2,425 long tons (2,464 t)
- Length: 390 ft 6 in (119.02 m)
- Beam: 40 ft 10 in (12.45 m)
- Draft: 14 ft 4 in (4.37 m)
- Propulsion: Geared turbines, 2 shafts, 60,000 shp (45 MW)
- Speed: 35 knots (65 km/h; 40 mph)
- Complement: 345
- Armament: 6 × 5"/38 caliber guns; 12 × 40 mm AA guns; 10 × 21 inch (533 mm) torpedo tubes; 6 × depth charge projectors; 2 × depth charge tracks

USS Samuel B. Roberts (DD-823), a Gearing-class destroyer, was the second ship of the United States Navy to be named for Samuel B. Roberts, a Navy coxswain who was killed evacuating Marines during the battle of Guadalcanal in 1942. The crew nicknamed the ship the "Steamin' Sammy B." for its busy schedule.

The second Samuel B. Roberts was laid down on 27 June 1945 by the Consolidated Steel Corporation, Orange, Texas; launched on 30 November 1945; sponsored by the namesake coxswain's mother; and commissioned on 22 December 1946.

== 1947–1953 ==
Following shakedown training off Guantanamo Bay in February 1947, Samuel B. Roberts joined the Atlantic Fleet. The ship participated in Atlantic Fleet maneuvers before proceeding to the Mediterranean in January 1948. Returning to the United States in June, the destroyer began another year of operations along the East Coast of the United States. A second tour of foreign duty took the ship to northern Europe from May to September 1949.

Roberts participated in western Atlantic operations until March 1950, when the ship sailed to the Mediterranean to join the 6th Fleet until October. Following operations in the western Atlantic and the Caribbean, the Roberts got underway for Scotland on 10 September 1952 to join NATO forces in "Operation Mainbrace", before proceeding to the Mediterranean to join the 6th Fleet. Two months later, in November, the ship returned for duty off northern Europe, and finally sailed for the United States, arriving at Newport on 29 January 1953.

== 1953–1957 ==
Samuel B. Roberts operated in the Atlantic and Caribbean from early 1953 until 3 August 1954, when the ship headed for the western Pacific, via the Panama Canal, to begin an around-the-world cruise. The destroyer spent five months in the waters around Japan and the Philippines, then sailed across the Indian Ocean and through the Suez Canal, arriving home on 14 March 1955. The remainder of 1955 was spent in local operations with the exception of a hastily ordered voyage in July to a lifeguard station off Greenland during President Eisenhower's flight to Geneva.

Western Atlantic operations in early 1956 gave way to foreign duty when Roberts again joined the 6th Fleet in the Mediterranean on 27 September. On 25 October, Roberts weighed anchor for the Persian Gulf and duty with the Middle East Force. The destroyer transited the Suez Canal on the night of 27/28 October, the last warship to transit the canal southbound before it was closed during the invasion of Egypt. The ship was then on duty with the Middle East Force until sailing for home by way of Pakistan, India, East Africa, the Cape of Good Hope, and Brazil. Roberts arrived in Newport on 14 March 1957.

With the exception of a Midshipman Cruise to Rio de Janeiro, Samuel B. Roberts remained near Newport until mid-September. The ship then participated in NATO exercises off northern Europe and returned to the United States on 22 October 1957.

== 1958 ==
In March 1958, after a three-month overhaul, the destroyer moved into the Caribbean for refresher training. In May, the exercises were interrupted. Roberts deployed hastily to Venezuela and prepared to evacuate United States nationals following the violence during Vice President Nixon's visit to South America. By the 15th, however, the situation was under control. Roberts was relieved and returned to Newport.

Two months later, the ship was ordered to Morehead City, North Carolina, to rendezvous with amphibious units carrying Marine reinforcements to the Mediterranean during the Lebanon crisis. By 25 July, the reinforcements were no longer needed. Roberts, as part of Destroyer Squadron 10, escorted the amphibious units to Puerto Rico, whence the destroyers continued on to the Mediterranean.

Arriving on 10 August, Roberts cruised off the coast of Lebanon from 17 August to 25 August and again from 2 to 20 September to furnish gunfire support to the troops on the beach if it proved necessary. On 17 September, the ship transited the Suez Canal on the way to the Persian Gulf for a few weeks. On the trip home, Roberts returned through the canal on 19 October, passed Gibraltar on 4 November, and arrived at the United States on 13 November.

== 1959–1960 ==
Roberts operated continuously in the western Atlantic until 15 June 1959, when the destroyer sailed from Newport for the St. Lawrence River to participate in Operation "Inland Seas", the opening of the St. Lawrence Seaway. After official ceremonies attended by Queen Elizabeth and President Eisenhower, Roberts transited the Seaway and crossed Lake Ontario and Lake Erie to arrive at Detroit, Michigan, on 3 July. On 20 July, Roberts moved into Lake Michigan with the first destroyer division to traverse all five Great Lakes. On 27 July, Roberts headed for the Atlantic again and arrived at Newport on 12 September.

After further U.S. East Coast activities, Roberts joined the 6th Fleet in the Mediterranean on 31 March 1960. On 29 May, the ship headed through the Suez Canal to join the Middle East Force; on 30 June, the destroyer rejoined the 6th Fleet in the Mediterranean. On 15 October, Roberts returned to Newport.

== 1962–1966 ==
Roberts spent most of 1961 undergoing a FRAM (Fleet Rehabilitation and Modernization) overhaul in the Philadelphia Naval Shipyard. The refurbished destroyer returned to Newport on 26 February 1962 and remained in the western Atlantic for the rest of 1962 and most of 1963. During April and June of the latter year, the ship operated off the northern New England coast in search of the missing submarine, Thresher.

In October 1963, Roberts resumed overseas operations; and, for the next two years, rotated between duty in the western Atlantic and tours with the 6th Fleet. In the fall of 1965, however, the ship headed south; transited the Panama Canal; and moved to the western Pacific to join the 7th Fleet. The destroyer operated primarily in Vietnamese and Philippine waters until 19 February 1966, then steamed for home via the Suez Canal and the Mediterranean. Returning to Newport, R.I., on 8 April, Roberts cruised in the Atlantic and Caribbean until deploying to the Mediterranean again on 8 December.

== 1967–1971 ==
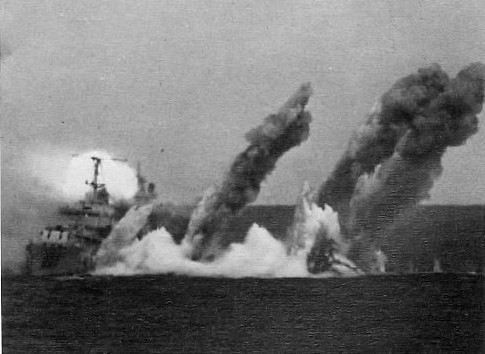
Samuel B. Roberts being sunk by A-6As of VA-34, 1971.

Samuel B. Roberts returned to Newport on 20 March, and remained in Atlantic and Caribbean waters until 10 January 1968, when the ship sailed on another tour of Mediterranean duty, returning to Newport on 17 May. The remainder of the year was spent in Atlantic operations, then Atlantic and Caribbean duty until deploying to the 6th Fleet in the Mediterranean on 22 November 1969. The ship steamed in the Black Sea from 9 to 12 December and returned to Newport on 22 May 1970.

In August 1970, the Inspection and Survey team ruled the ship unfit for further service. The crew stripped her for decommissioning, and the ship was struck from the Navy List on 2 November. Roberts joined the Inactive Fleet at Philadelphia, Pennsylvania, until she was sunk as a target in the Atlantic Ocean 195 nautical miles (224 mi; 361 km) north of Puerto Rico on 14 November 1971. The ship's final resting place is 21°42.8′N 65°55.1′W, 3,000 fathoms (18,000 feet; 5,500 meters) below the surface.
