= Heavy-lift ship =

Vessel designed to move very large loads

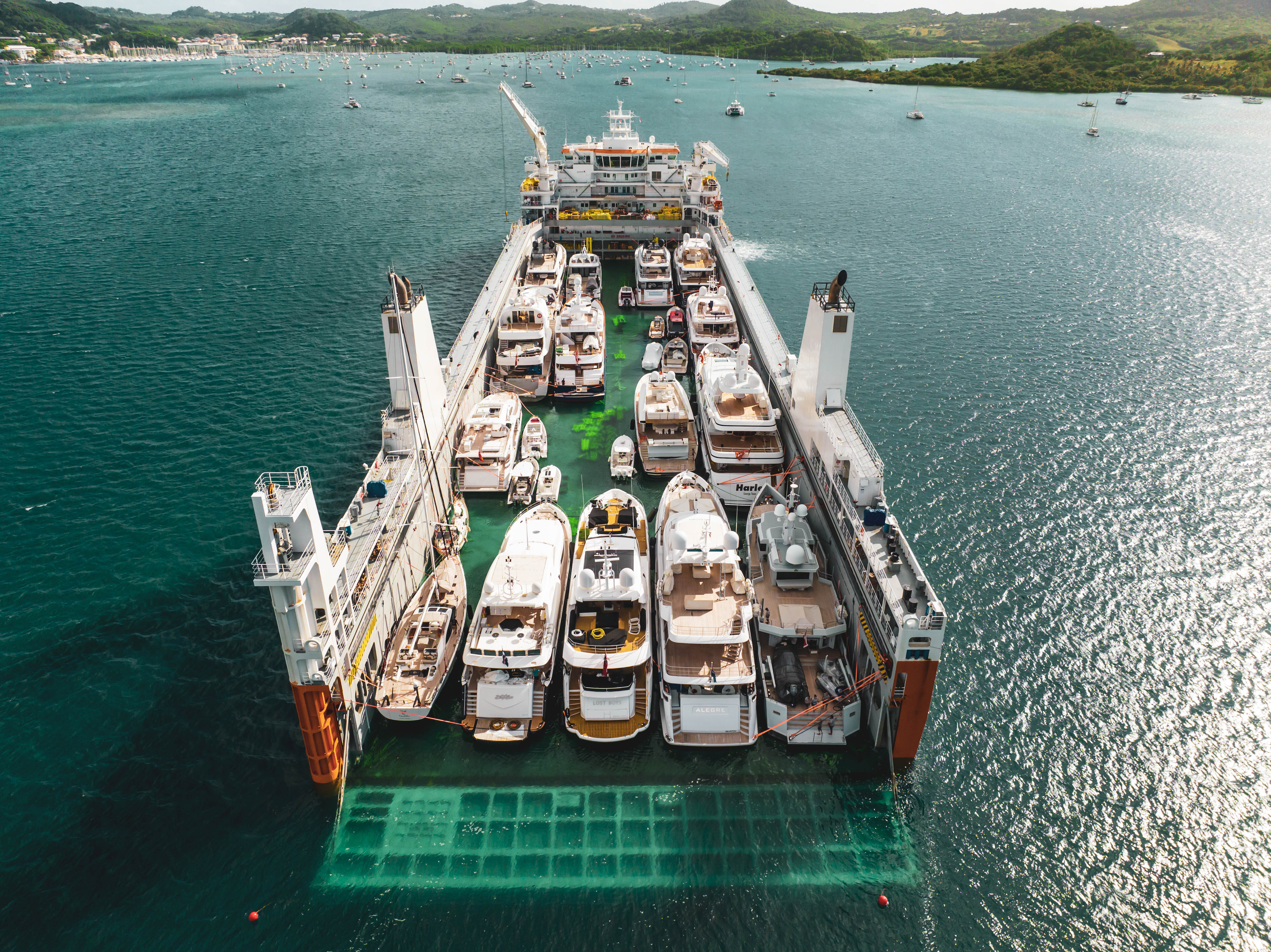
m/v Yacht Servant in Le Marin, Martinique submerged with cargo of yachts

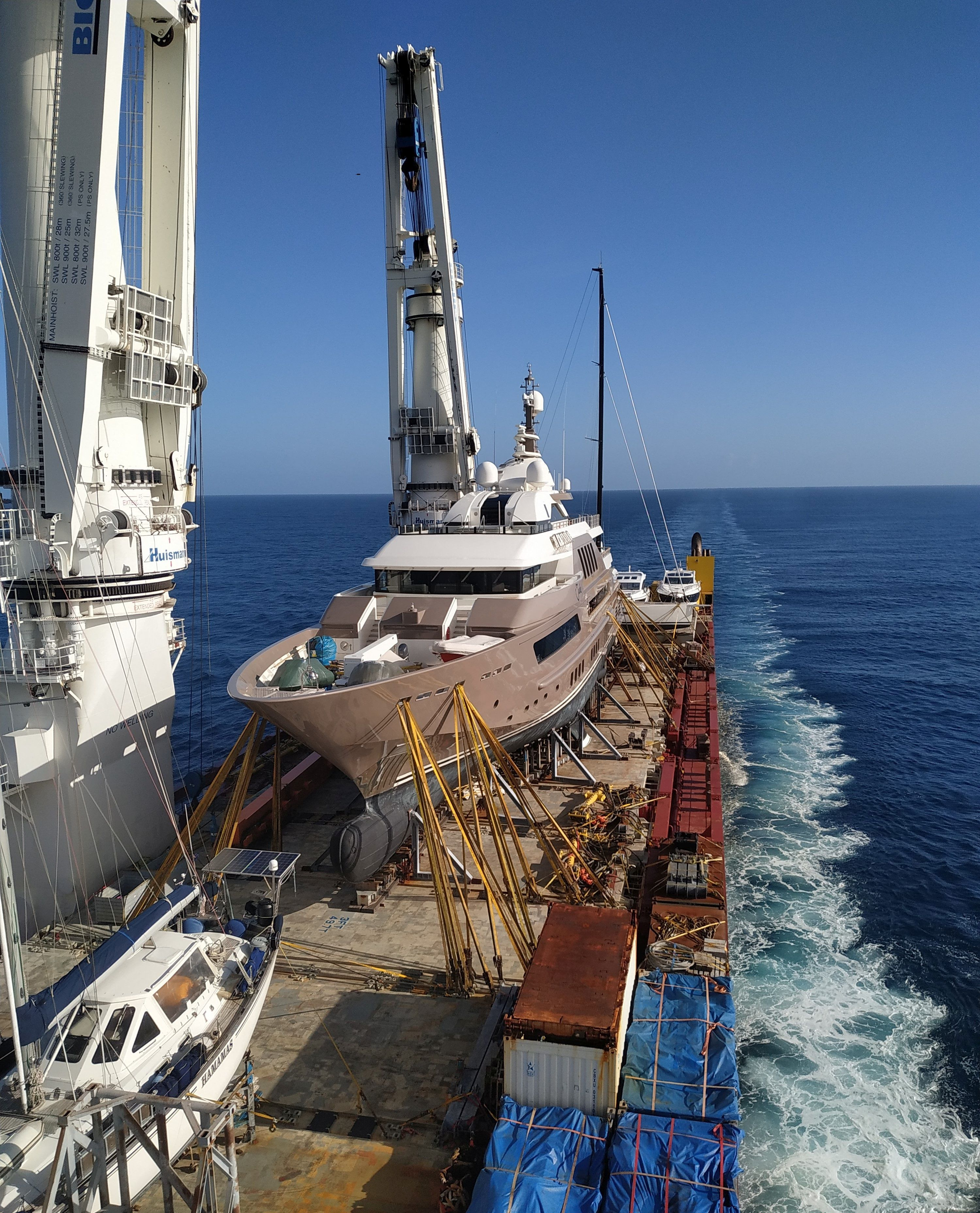
m/v "Happy Sky" with the cargo of yachts on her way to Australia

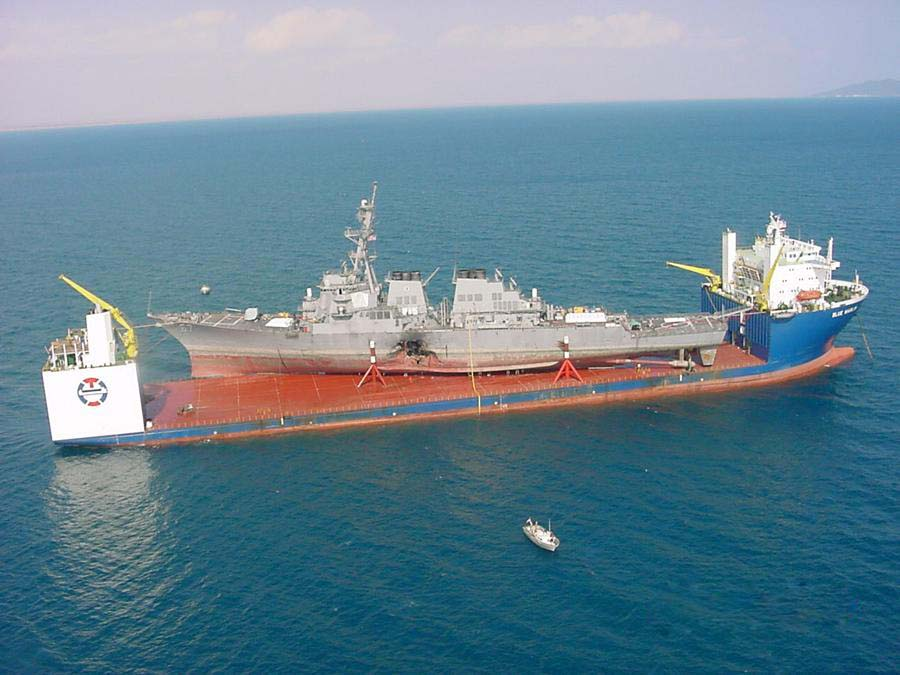
MV Blue Marlin carrying USS Cole after penetration by an Al-Qaeda explosive.

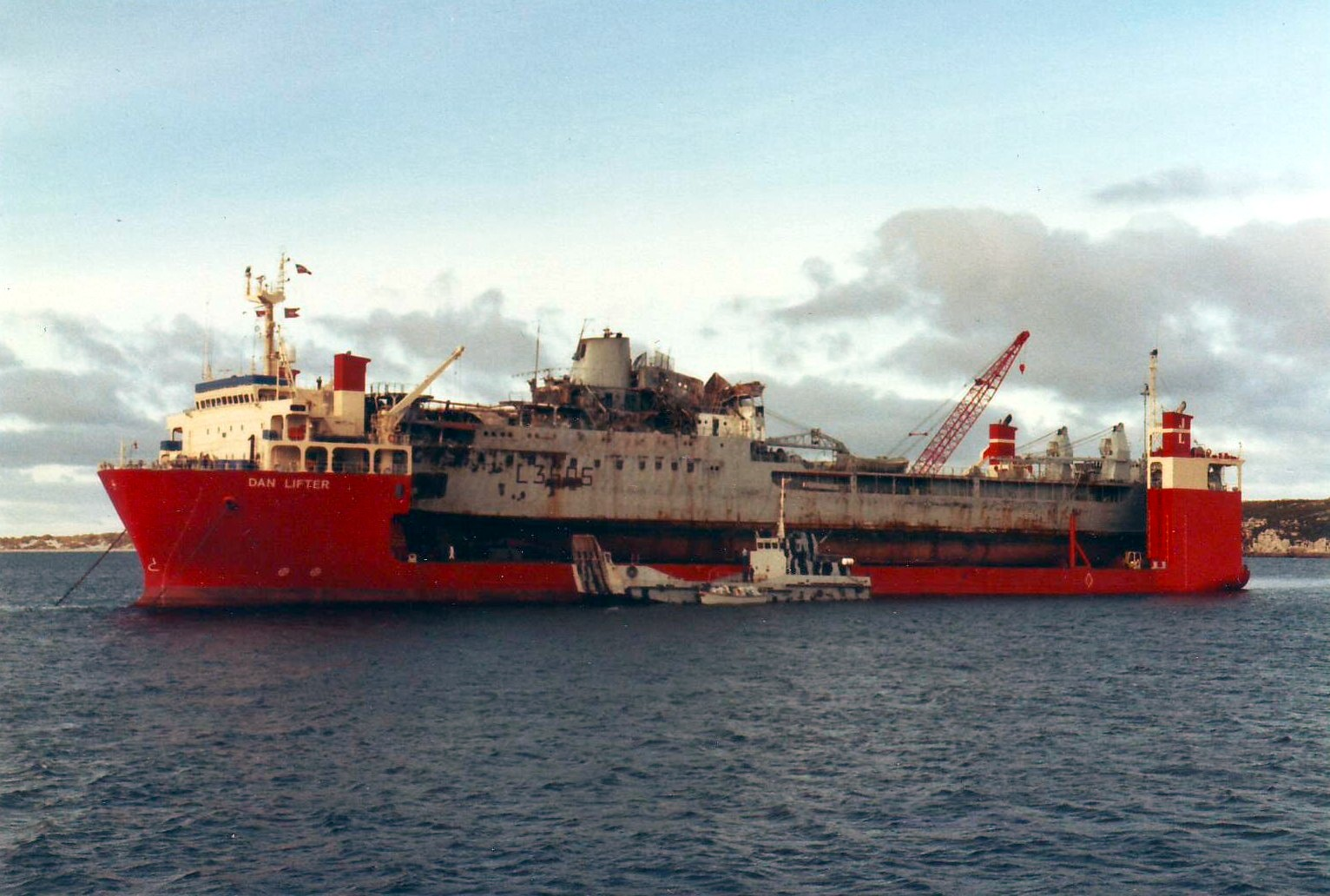
MV Dan Lifter returns RFA Sir Tristram to the United Kingdom in 1983 after she was badly damaged during the Falklands War of 1982.

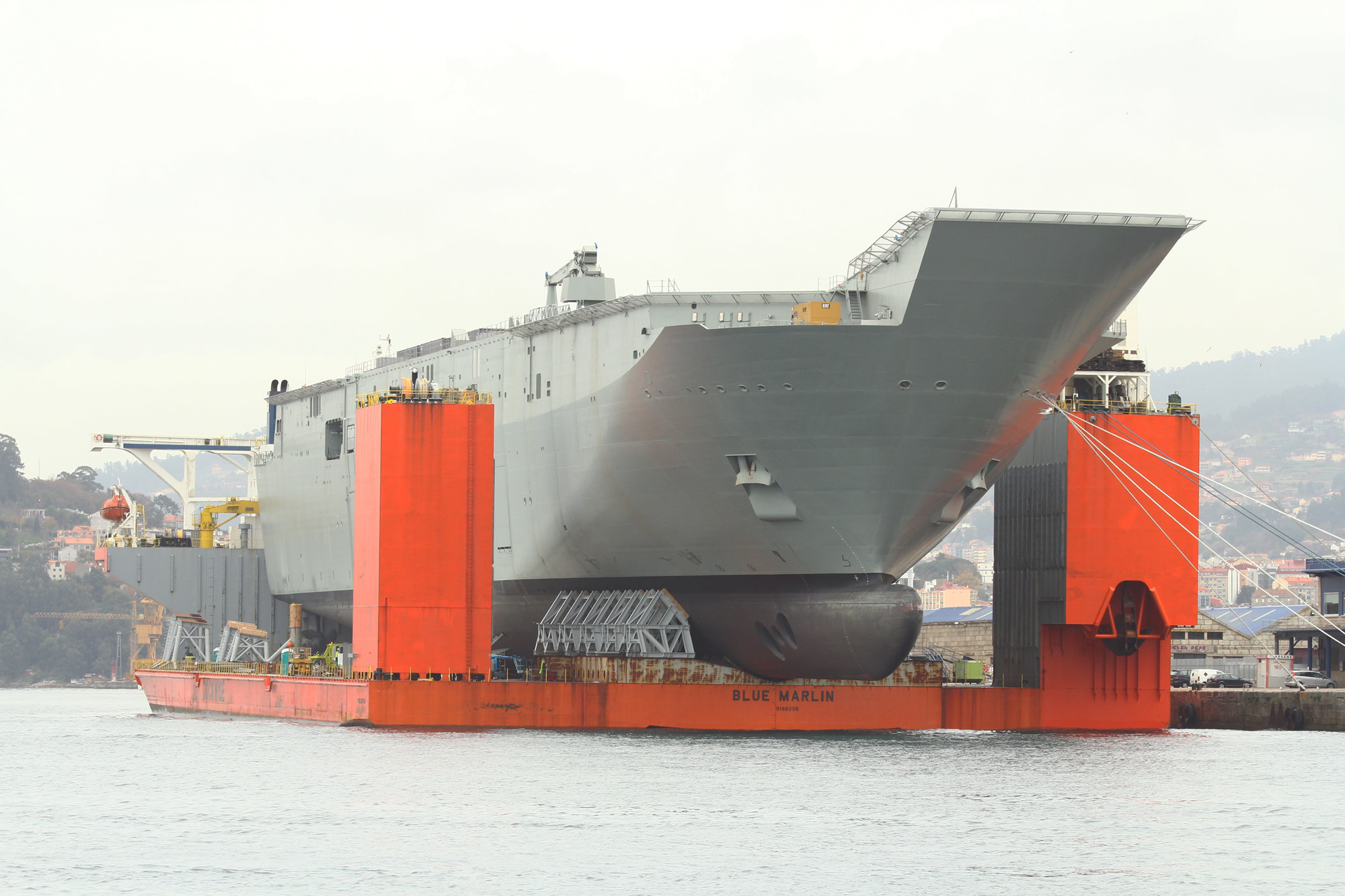
The incomplete Australian landing helicopter dock HMAS Adelaide embarked on Blue Marlin

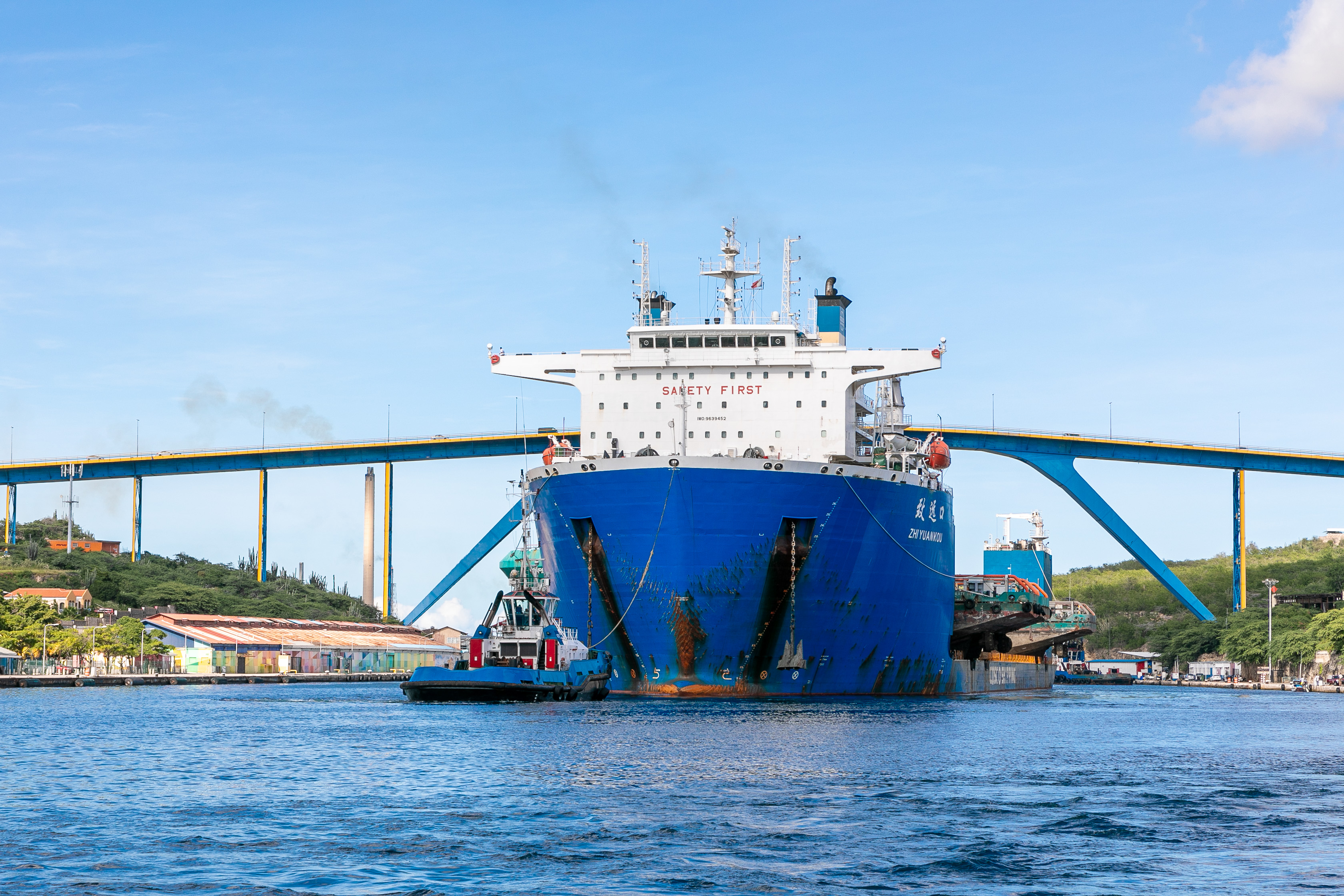
Cosco Shipping Zhi Yan Kou in Curaçao carrying three smaller vessels on board.

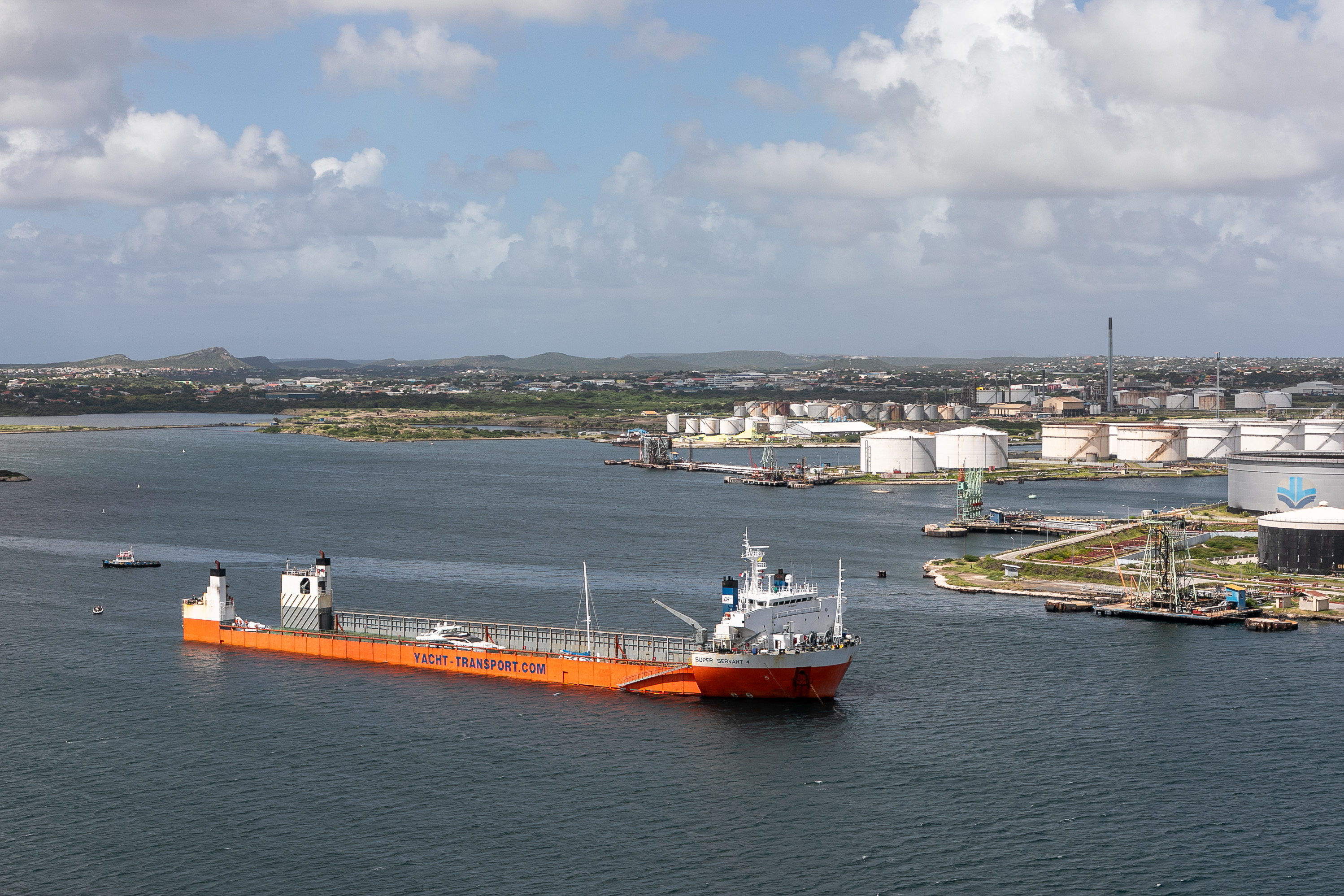
Spliethoff groups yacht transport semi-submersible Super Servant 4 in Curaçao.

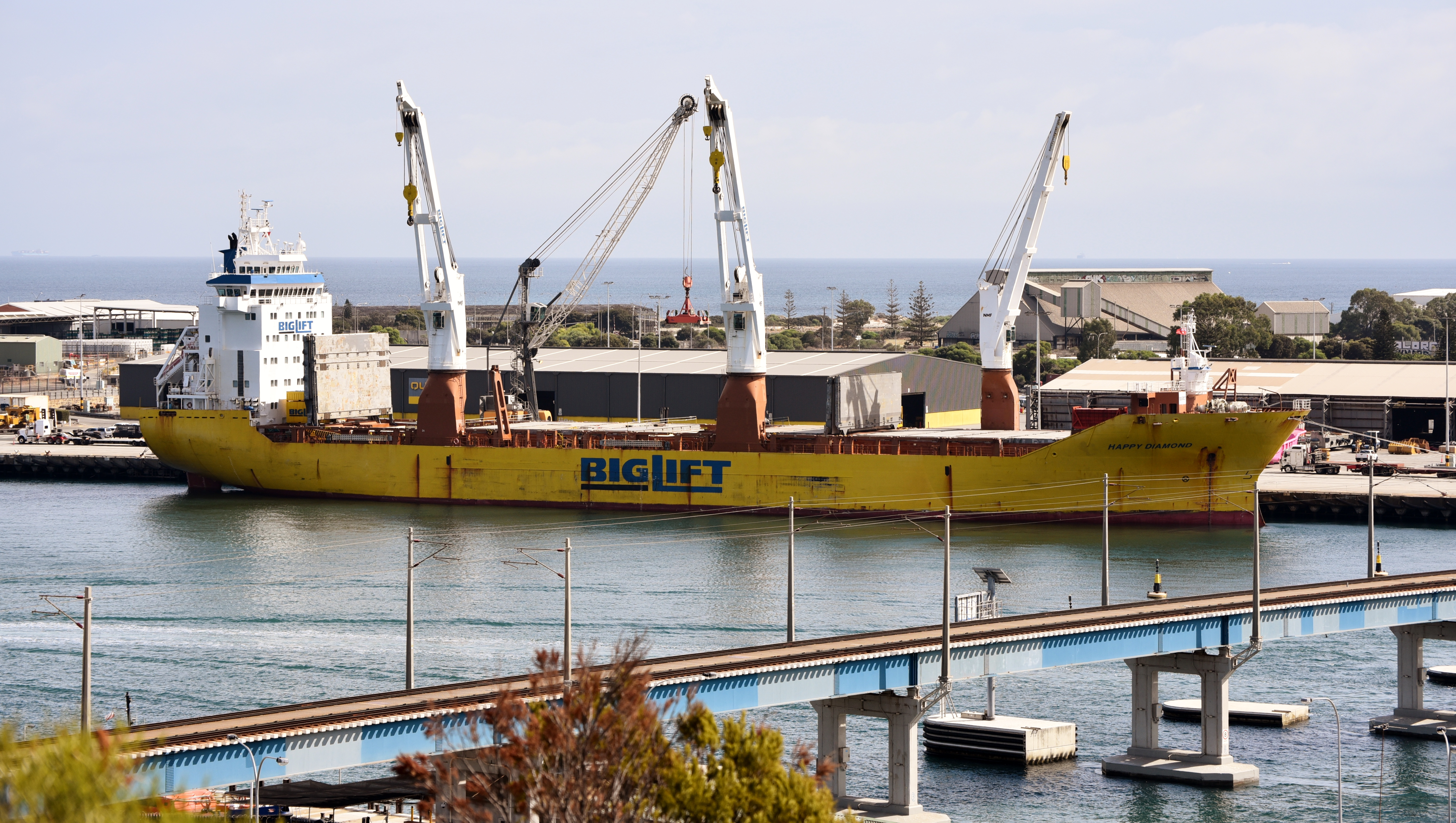
Project cargo ship Happy Diamond berthed at Fremantle, Australia

A heavy-lift ship is a vessel designed to move very large loads that cannot be transported by normal ships.

== Description ==
There are several types of heavy-lift ships:

=== Semi-submersible ships ===
Semi-submersible ships take on water to allow the load—usually another vessel—to be floated over the deck and raised above the waterline. Its ballast tanks are flooded to lower the well deck below the water's surface, allowing oil platforms, other vessels, or other floating cargo to be moved into position for loading (float-on/float-off). The tanks are then pumped out, and the well deck rises to bear the load. To balance the cargo, the tanks can be pumped out unevenly. They typically have a long and low well deck between a forward pilot house and an aft machinery space. In superficial appearance, it is somewhat similar to a dry bulk carrier or some forms of oil tanker.

Float-on/float off vessels transport oil drilling rigs. Such ships can carry the rigs from their construction site to a drilling site at roughly three to four times the speed of a self-deploying rig. Rapid deployment of the rig to the drilling site can result in major savings. They also transport other out-sized cargo and yachts.

==== Examples ====
Many of the larger ships of this class are owned by the Dutch company Royal Boskalis, including Mighty Servant 1, Blue Marlin, and MV Black Marlin. Boskalis acquired these ships during their takeover of Dockwise in 2013. In 2004, Dockwise increased the deck width of Blue Marlin, making it the then-largest heavy transport carrier in the world until it was surpassed by the launch of Dockwise Vanguard in 2012.

Cosco Shipping has available a fleet of 16 different size semi-submersible vessels which they claim to be the world's largest semi-submersible heavy lift fleet.

Dutch Spliethoff groups DYT Yacht Transport provides services with this type of vessels to yacht owners enabling to have their yacht "where it needs to be, when it needs to be there".

The United States Navy has had an independent heavy-lift capability since 2013 when it commissioned its first semi-submersible ship, USNS Montford Point.

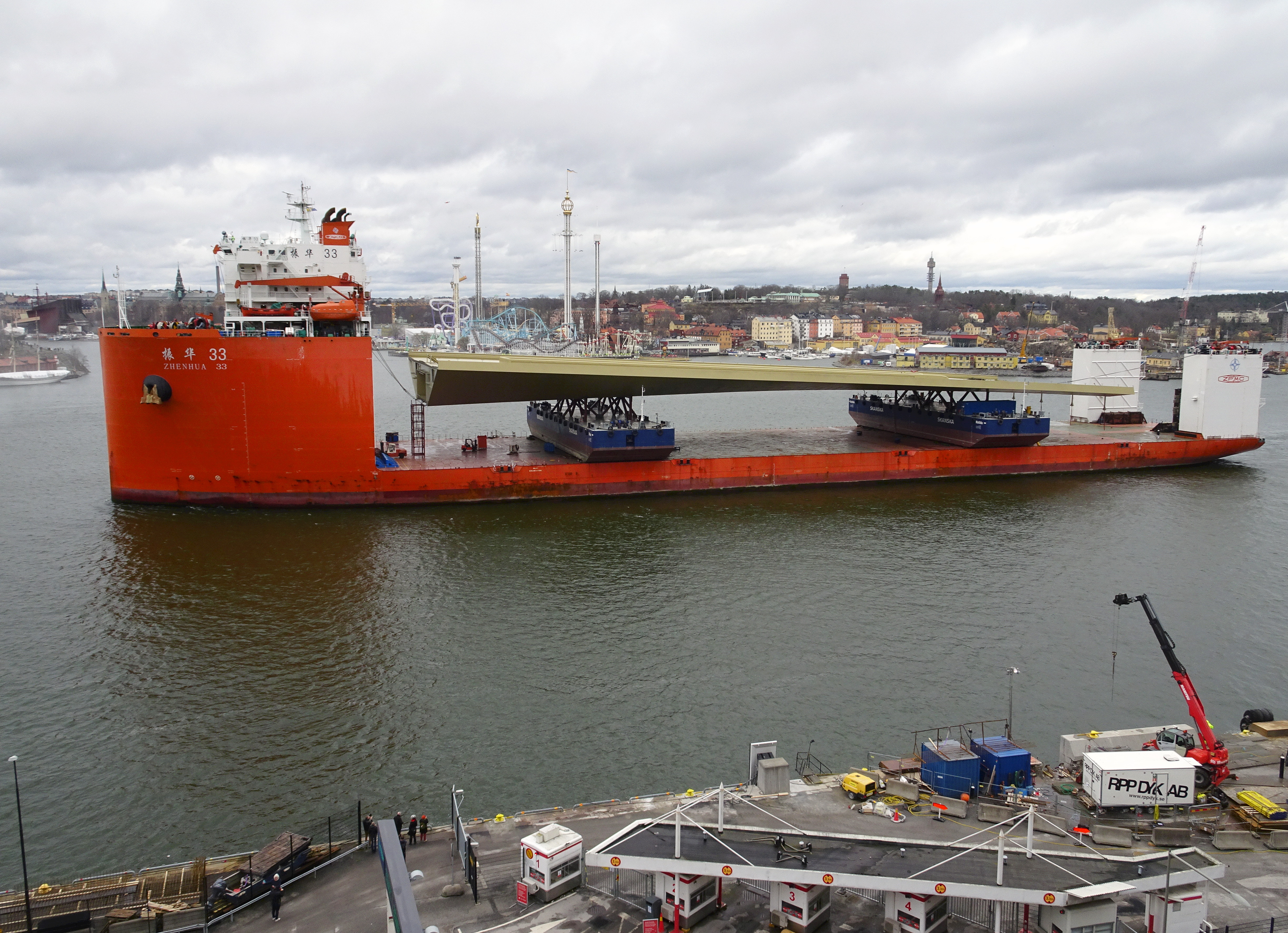
Zhen Hua 33 and Guldbron in Stockholm, Sweden, 11 March 2020

The People's Liberation Army Navy has fielded semi-submersible ships since 2015.

Shanghai Zhenhua Shipping Co., Ltd. a specialized maritime transportation arm of Shanghai Zhenhua Heavy Industries Co., Ltd. (ZPMC) operates a fleet of over 20-25 specialized, large deck-carrier vessels.

=== Project cargo ships ===
Project cargo ships are non-submersible ships that load large and heavy cargo items with at least one on-board cranes and sufficient ballast to assure stability and sea-keeping properties. Such vessels have between 13,000 and 19,000 deadweight tonnage (DWT) capacity. Examples of cargo transported includes container cranes, bridge sections, and suction piles.

== History ==
During the 1920s, the Bremen-based shipping company DDG Hansa had a growing demand of shipments for assembled locomotives to British India. That resulted in the construction of the world's first heavy lift vessel, SS Lichtenfels with a 120 t (118 long tons; 132 short tons) derrick. After World War II, DDG Hansa became the world's largest heavy lift shipping company. In terms of lifting capacity it reached its maximum in 1978 with refitting the Japanese-built bulk carrier MV Trifels with two 320-tonne (315-long-ton; 353-short-ton) Stülcken derricks. Soon after that, in 1980, DDG became bankrupt. With that, only the Dutch shipping companies Jumbo, BigLift Shipping (until 2001 named Mammoet Shipping) and SAL Heavy lift were left as heavy lift shipping specialists.

== Incidents ==
The United States Navy has used such ships to bring damaged warships back to the United States for repair. The first was the guided missile frigate USS Samuel B. Roberts, which was nearly sunk by a naval mine in the central Persian Gulf on 14 April 1988. The frigate was towed to Dubai, then floated home to Newport, Rhode Island, aboard Mighty Servant 2.

Eleven years later, MV Blue Marlin transported the U.S. guided missile destroyer USS Cole from Aden, Yemen, to Pascagoula, Mississippi, after the warship was damaged in a bombing attack on 12 October 2000.

In 2004, Blue Marlin carried the world's largest semi-submersible oil platform, BP's Thunder Horse PDQ, from the Daewoo Shipbuilding & Marine Engineering shipyard in South Korea to Kiewit Offshore Services in Ingleside, Texas.

USS Fitzgerald was transported from Japan to Alabama after its 2017 collision with ACX Crystal.

The U.S. Navy has also chartered other heavy lift ships to carry smaller craft, usually mine-countermeasure craft, or other patrol craft. Since there are no US-flagged heavy float-on/float-off ships, the U.S. Navy normally relies on its Military Sealift Command to charter them from the world commercial market.

== See also ==
- Semi-submersible naval vessel
