= Danviken Hospital =

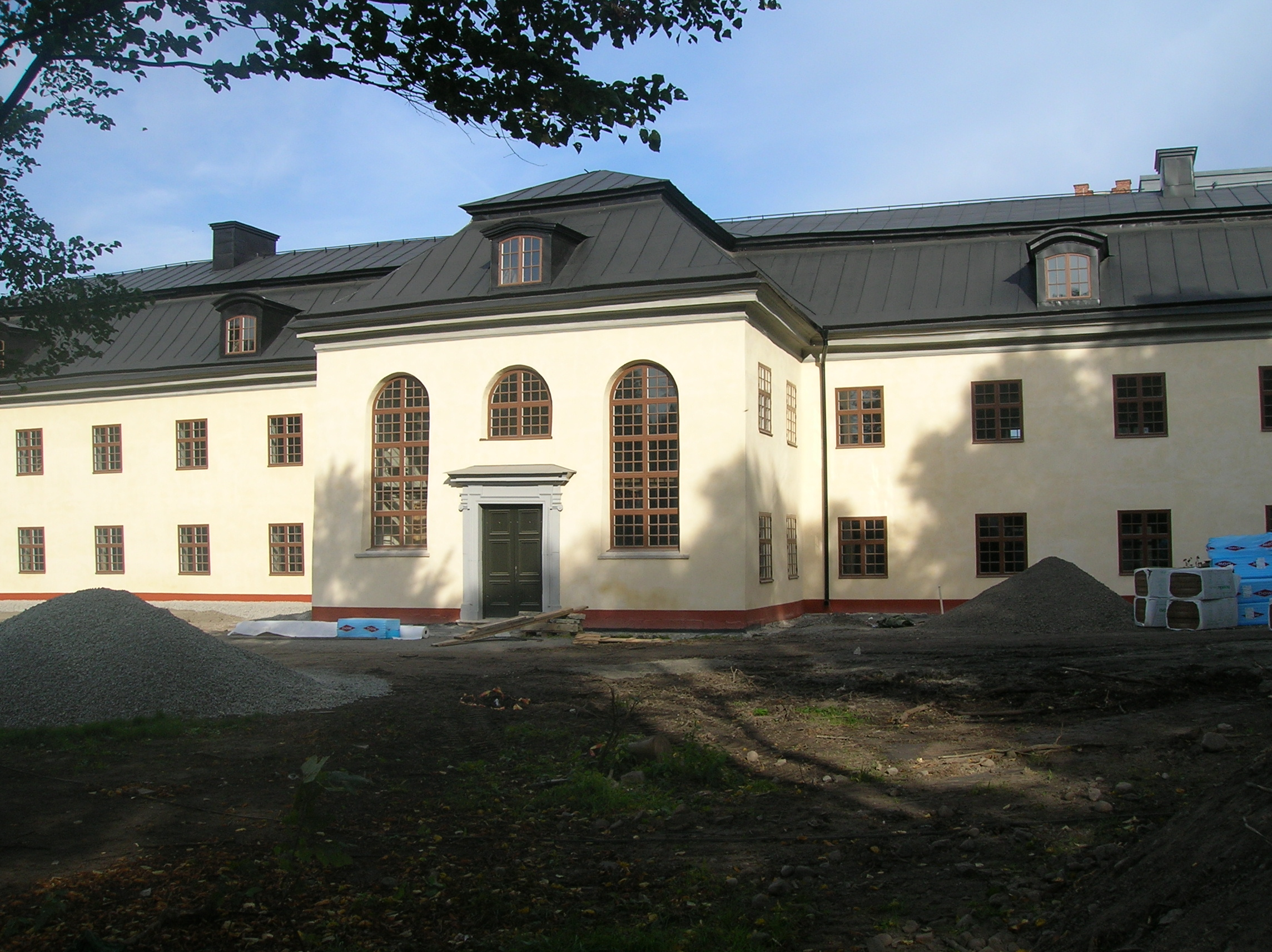
- Danviken Hospital in 2009

Geography
- Location: Stockholm County, Sweden
- Coordinates: 59°18′52″N 18°06′27″E

Links
- Lists: Hospitals in Sweden

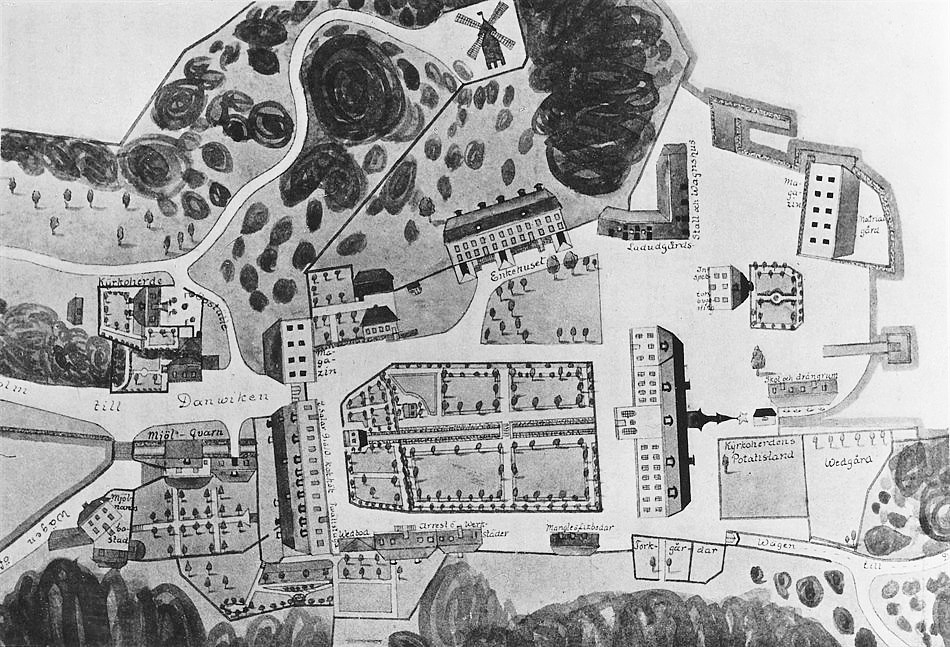
Map of Danviken Hospital in 1848.

Danvikens hospital was a historical Swedish hospital, insane asylum and retirement home in Stockholm, active in 1558–1861. The area belonged to Stockholms kommun until 1984, when it was transferred to Nacka kommun.

The Danvikens hospital was founded by the initiative of King Gustav Vasa in 1558. The current building is designed by Göran Josuæ Adelcrantz (1668–1739) and dates back to 1718–1725. From the 1740s, the hospital also functioned as an Insane asylum. The hospital is frequently mentioned within literature and during the 18th and 19th centuries; the name Danviken was used in common language as a synonym for a "Mad House". A famous description of the Danviken Asylum was Fältskärns berättelser (The tales of a Feldsher) by Zacharias Topelius from the 1780s. The facilities were emptied in 1861 and the asylum closed in 1863 because of the decaying buildings. It is now used as an Art Gallery.
