= Söderström (Stockholm) =

Watercourse in central Stockholm, Sweden

Coordinates: 59°19′18.77″N 18°4′11.03″E

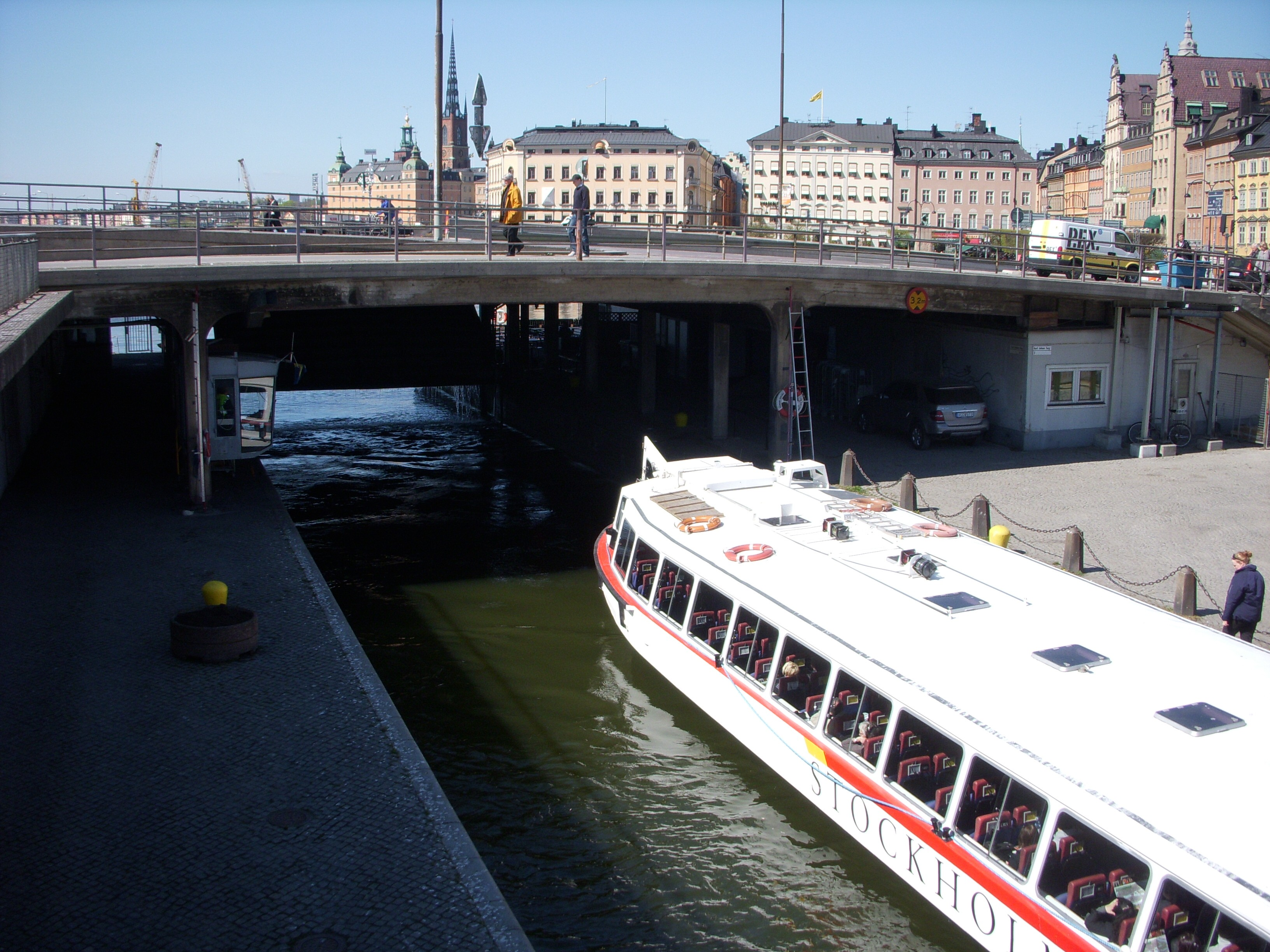
- The Söderström at the Karl Johan lock.

Location
- Country: Sweden

Söderström is a river in central Stockholm that connects Lake Mälaren with the Baltic Sea. It runs south of Gamla stan from Riddarfjärden to Stockholms ström (the western part of Saltsjön). It is one of two natural waterways between Mälaren and the Baltic sea, the other being Norrström north of Gamla stan. Centralbron crosses the waterway.

The river is locked by Karl Johansslussen (Karl Johan's lock), and most of the time is conceived as more like a bay of Mälaren. The area around the lock is known as the Slussenområdet, and beginning in 2016 is undergoing a major revitalization. The channel of an older lock, known as the Nils Ericson lock, still exists just to the north of Karl Johansslussen. This lock is hidden by the steps leading to Karl Johans Torg, but it still allows for the discharge of water from Mälaren into the Baltic. It is planned to convert the channel of this older lock into a fish ladder, as the revitalized area will include two much larger discharge channels on either side of the new lock.
