= Zhen Hua 33 =

Semi-submersible heavy lift ship

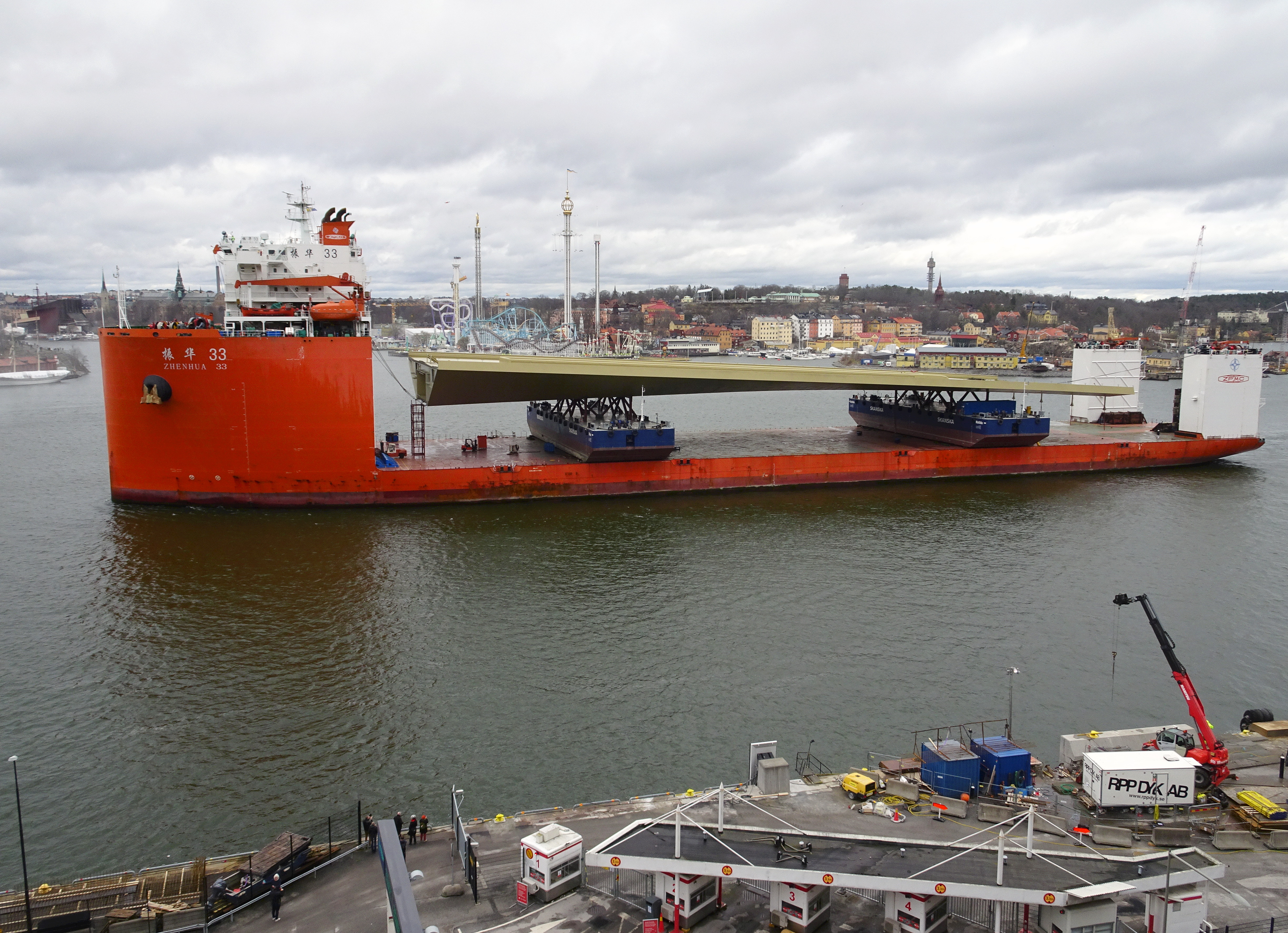
- Zhen Hua 33 at Stockholm in March 2020

History
- Name: Zhen Hua 33
- Owner: Shanghai Zhenhua Shipping Co
- Port of registry: Shanghai, China
- Builder: ZPMC, Nantong, China
- Laid down: 2016
- Completed: 2017
- Identification: IMO number: 9808223; Call sign: BTTR; MMSI number: 414272000

General characteristics
- Class & type: CCS
- Type: Semi-submersible heavy-lift ship
- Tonnage: 43,788 GT; 50,352 DWT
- Length: 227 m (744 ft 9 in) oa
- Beam: 43 m (141 ft 1 in)
- Draught: 7.6 m (24 ft 11 in) (sailing); 13.5 m (44 ft 3 in) (submerged)
- Ice class: B
- Speed: 13.5 knots (25.0 km/h; 15.5 mph) (loaded)
- Crew: Capacity 55 bunks

Zhen Hua 33 is a Chinese-flagged semi-submersible heavy-lift ship designed to carry large cargo, including other vessels and offshore rigs, on her 185 m × 43 m (607 ft × 141 ft) cargo deck.

In early 2020, Zhen Hua 33 became semi-famous in Sweden for carrying Guldbron to replace the old traffic interchange at Slussen in Stockholm, manufactured by China Railway Shanhaiguan Bridge Group on behalf of Skanska, the contractors for the remodelled Slussen. The 140 m (460 ft) long, 3,700 t (3,600 long tons; 4,100 short tons) bridge was intended to travel from China to Sweden in around seven weeks, arriving in mid-February 2020, but was delayed off the coast of Spain for almost a month due to bad weather in the Atlantic Ocean. She was eventually able to continue towards Sweden at the beginning of March, and arrived in Stockholm on 11 March 2020.
