= Göran Josuæ Adelcrantz =

Swedish architect (1668–1739)

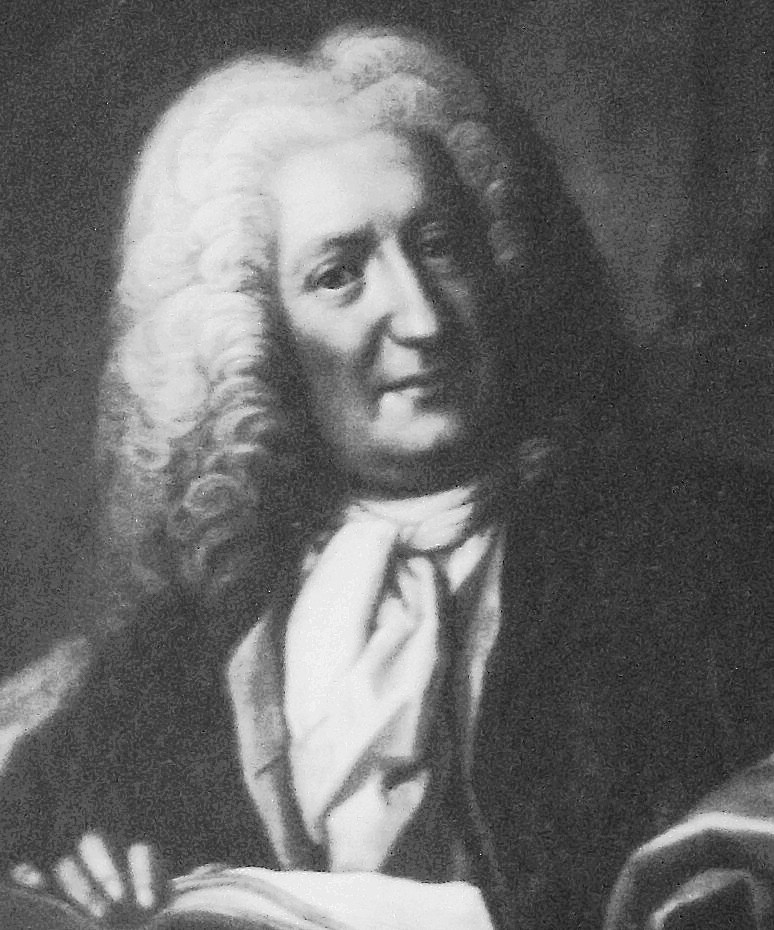
- Born: November 15, 1668; Stockholm, Sweden
- Died: February 26, 1739 (aged 70)
- Occupation: Architect
- Notable work: restoration Katarina Church, Hedvig Eleonora Church

Göran Josuæ Adelcrantz (November 15, 1668 – February 26, 1739) was a Swedish Architect. He was born in Stockholm and studied architecture under Nicodemus Tessin the Younger. In 1704-1707 Adelcrantz traveled to Germany, France and Italy. He was later promoted to court architect. Almost none of Adelcrantz's architecture survives. He is best known for the restoration of the Katarina Church and Hedvig Eleonora Church in Stockholm.

Adelcrantz's son Carl Fredrik Adelcrantz also worked as an architect.

== background ==
Adelcrantz was the son of court clerk Josua Tornquist and Cecilia Andra. He learned the art of construction from the Nicodemus Tessin the Younger. From 1704 to 1707, he made several study trips to Germany, France, and Italy to study architecture. He was then appointed architect to the royal court and was employed as an assistant in Ticino for the construction of the new royal palace in Stockholm. He was ennobled in 1712 and then took the name Adelcrantz. He was appointed city architect in 1715 and was dismissed by the government in 1727 for political reasons. However, he continues to work as an architect in Stockholm.

Among his most important works that have been preserved so far are the restoration of the Catherine Church and the completion of the Hedvig Eleanor Church, both located in Stockholm, as well as the main building of Danviken Hospital, which was originally located in the city of Stockholm, but is now part of the municipality of Naka.

Adelcrantz married Anna Maria Kuhnmann in 1711. He is the father of the architect Karl Friedrich Adelcrantz and the vice president of the Court of Appeal of Gotha Emanuel Adelcrantz (1721-1788). This line ended with the death of Carl Frederick in 1796.
